= Members of the Queensland Legislative Council, 1870–1879 =

This is a list of members of the Queensland Legislative Council from 1 January 1870 to 31 December 1879. Appointments, made by the Governor of Queensland, were for life, although many members for one reason or another resigned.

It was expanded from 21 to 30 members during the period, with 6 members being added on 2 January 1874, and another three on 12 May 1877.

== Office bearers ==
President of the Legislative Council:

- Maurice Charles O'Connell (26 August 1860 – 23 March 1879)
- Joshua Peter Bell (3 April 1879 – 20 December 1881)

Chairman of Committees:

- Daniel Foley Roberts (30 May 1860 – 26 July 1889)

== Members ==
Name	Date appointed	Date left	Reason for leaving
John Alexander Bell	26 September 1866	21 November 1872	Resignation
Joshua Peter Bell	3 April 1879	20 December 1881	
Francis Edward Bigge	1 May 1860	16 May 1873	Resignation
William Draper Box	2 January 1874	26 January 1904	
Alfred Henry Brown	12 January 1874	26 January 1882	
Eyles Browne	3 July 1863	14 August 1882	
Archibald Buchanan	2 January 1874	6 June 1878	Seat vacated
Charles Hardie Buzacott	21 January 1879	5 July 1882	
James Cowlishaw	18 April 1878	15 March 1922	
George Edmondstone	12 May 1877	23 February 1883	
Gilbert Eliott	15 November 1870	30 June 1871	Death
Henry Fitz	23 May 1860	16 May 1873	Unknown
John Clark Foote	12 May 1877	18 August 1895	
John Galloway	13 November 1869	17 April 1872	Resignation
James Garrick	13 November 1869	8 December 1870	Seat vacated
James Gibbon	22 February 1866	19 February 1887	
St. George Richard Gore	3 July 1863	16 August 1871	Death
Francis Thomas Gregory	2 January 1874	23 October 1888	
Henry Harden	10 June 1868	1 June 1870	Resignation
Frederick Hart	11 July 1872	15 July 1915	
George Harris	23 May 1860	31 August 1876	Resignation
John Heussler	26 September 1866	8 October 1870	Seat vacated
John Heussler	13 December 1870	26 October 1907	
William Hobbs	26 April 1861	18 October 1880	
Samuel Hodgson	6 November 1871	16 April 1872	Resignation
Louis Hope	24 April 1862	1 November 1882	
William Lambert	15 March 1872	3 December 1901	
Francis Ivory	15 September 1879	1 July 1881	
William Long	10 March 1873	1 March 1878	Resignation
John Frederick McDougall	1 May 1860	13 September 1895	
Charles Mein	19 May 1876	22 April 1885	
Charles Melbourne	18 April 1878	18 August 1885	
John Mullen	26 April 1872	11 July 1883	
Thomas Lodge Murray-Prior	22 February 1866	31 December 1892	
Maurice Charles O'Connell	1 May 1860	23 March 1879	Death
Dr. Kevin O'Doherty	12 May 1877	4 November 1885	
William Pettigrew	12 May 1877	23 June 1894	
Robert Ramsay	2 January 1874	14 June 1877	Seat vacated
Daniel Foley Roberts	23 May 1860	26 July 1889	
Gordon Sandeman	2 January 1874	18 August 1886	
Henry Simpson	29 July 1868	29 April 1882	
Thomas Blacket Stephens	22 July 1876	26 August 1877	Death
James Swan	18 April 1878	26 May 1891	
James Taylor	4 November 1871	17 August 1893	
George Thorn	9 January 1874	16 June 1876	Transferred to Assembly
William Thornton	26 September 1866	8 September 1879	Resignation
John Turner	18 April 1878	29 July 1900	
William Henry Walsh	20 February 1879	5 April 1888	
Claudius Buchanan Whish	23 June 1870	22 April 1872	Resignation
William Duckett White	26 April 1861	5 August 1880	
William Wilson	2 January 1874	6 June 1878	Seat vacated
William Yaldwyn	10 June 1868	15 May 1877	Resignation
