= Members of the Queensland Legislative Council, 1880–1889 =

This is a list of members of the Queensland Legislative Council from 1 January 1880 to 31 December 1889. Appointments, made by the Governor of Queensland, were for life, although many members for one reason or another resigned.

The chamber grew in size from 30 to 38 members during the course of the decade.

== Office bearers ==
President of the Legislative Council:

- Joshua Peter Bell (3 April 1879 – 20 December 1881)
- Arthur Hunter Palmer (24 December 1881 – 20 March 1898)

Chairman of Committees:

- Daniel Foley Roberts (30 May 1860 – 26 July 1889)
- Thomas Lodge Murray-Prior (31 July 1889 – 31 December 1892)

== Members ==
Name	Date appointed	Date left	Reason for leaving
William Aplin	19 October 1880	18 February 1901	
Joshua Peter Bell	3 April 1879	20 December 1881	Death
William Draper Box	2 January 1874	26 January 1904	
Frederic Brentnall	17 April 1886	23 March 1922	
Alfred Henry Brown	12 January 1874	26 January 1882	Resignation
Eyles Browne	3 July 1863	14 August 1882	Unknown
Charles Hardie Buzacott	21 January 1879	5 July 1882	Resignation
James Cowlishaw	18 April 1878	15 March 1922	
John Deane	31 July 1889	27 October 1913	
George Edmondstone	12 May 1877	23 February 1883	Death
John Clark Foote	12 May 1877	18 August 1895	
Edward Barrow Forrest	15 August 1882	8 March 1899	
William Forrest	13 May 1883	23 April 1903	
James Garrick^{[2]}	13 November 1883	28 August 1894	
James Gibbon	22 February 1866	19 February 1887	Seat vacated
William Graham	5 August 1880	7 June 1892	
Augustus Gregory	10 November 1882	25 June 1905	
Francis Thomas Gregory	2 January 1874	23 October 1888	Death
Frederick Hart	11 July 1872	15 July 1915	
John Heussler	13 December 1870	26 October 1907	
William Hobbs	26 April 1861	18 October 1880	Resignation
Frederick Holberton	4 July 1885	9 September 1907	
Louis Hope	24 April 1862	1 November 1882	Resignation
Francis Ivory	15 September 1879	1 July 1881	Resignation
George King	26 January 1882	19 March 1890	
James Lalor	23 August 1888	11 August 1921	
William Lambert	15 March 1872	3 December 1901	
John Macansh	17 April 1886	1 August 1896	
Thomas MacDonald-Paterson	22 April 1885	11 March 1896	
John Frederick McDougall	1 May 1860	13 September 1895	
Peter MacPherson	1 July 1881	12 September 1913	
Charles Marks	28 November 1888	23 March 1922	
Charles Mein	26 April 1872	11 July 1883	Resignation
Charles Melbourne	18 April 1878	18 August 1885	Seat vacated
Boyd Dunlop Morehead	31 December 1880	3 August 1883	Transferred to Assembly
Berkeley Basil Moreton	25 May 1888	25 June 1891	
John Mullen	26 April 1872	11 July 1883	Seat vacated
Thomas Lodge Murray-Prior	22 February 1866	31 December 1892	
Dr. Kevin O'Doherty	12 May 1877	4 November 1885	Resignation
Arthur Hunter Palmer	24 December 1881	20 March 1898	
William Pettigrew	12 May 1877	23 June 1894	
William Grene Power	19 September 1883	14 August 1903	
Daniel Foley Roberts	23 May 1860	26 July 1889	Death
Alexander Raff	14 August 1884	10 June 1910	
Thomas Rome	1 July 1881	24 January 1882	Resignation
Gordon Sandeman	2 January 1874	18 August 1886	Seat vacated
John Scott	23 August 1888	26 June 1890	
Henry Simpson	29 July 1868	29 April 1882	Resignation
James Thorneloe Smith	23 August 1888	14 March 1902	
Joseph Smyth	5 May 1882	16 July 1910	
James Swan	18 April 1878	26 May 1891	
James Taylor^{[1]}	4 November 1871	17 August 1893	
William Taylor	17 April 1886	23 March 1922	
Andrew Joseph Thynne	26 January 1882	23 March 1922	
William Thornton	30 October 1882	27 June 1884	Death
John Turner	18 April 1878	29 July 1900	
William Henry Walsh	20 February 1879	5 April 1888	Death
William Duckett White	26 April 1861	5 August 1880	Resignation
Andrew Wilson	19 September 1883	29 August 1906	
Walter Horatio Wilson	4 July 1885	28 February 1902	
Henry Wood	17 April 1886	31 December 1902	

^{1} James Taylor resigned from the Council on 10 January 1881 but was reappointed on 1 July 1881.
^{2} James Garrick was previously a member of the Legislative Council from 13 November 1869 until 8 December 1870.
