= Members of the Queensland Legislative Council, 1860–1869 =

This is a list of members of the Queensland Legislative Council from its creation on 1 May 1860 to 31 December 1869. Appointments, made by the Governor of Queensland, were for life, although many members for one reason or another resigned. Prior to 1860, Queensland was part of the colony of New South Wales.

Starting with 11 members, by 26 April 1861, the council had increased to 21 members. From then until the end of the decade, the mean membership was slightly over 20, ranging from 16–17 for a period from July 1865 to February 1866, to 23–24 for a period from July 1863 to April 1864.

== Office bearers ==
President of the Legislative Council:

- Charles Nicholson (22 May 1860 – 26 August 1860)
- Maurice Charles O'Connell (26 August 1860 – 23 March 1879)

Chairman of Committees:

- Daniel Foley Roberts (30 May 1860 – 26 July 1889)

== Members ==
The following members served in the Legislative Council between 1860 and 1869:

Name	Date appointed	Date left	Reason for leaving
John Balfour	1 May 1860	23 April 1864	Resignation
William Barker	26 April 1861	22 July 1863	Resignation
John Alexander Bell	26 September 1866	21 November 1872	
Francis Edward Bigge	1 May 1860	16 May 1873	
John Bramston	3 July 1863	17 November 1869	Resignation
Alfred Henry Brown	26 April 1861	13 May 1863	Resignation
Eyles Browne	3 July 1863	14 August 1882	
Alfred Compigne	1 May 1860	23 April 1864	Resignation
John Douglas	22 February 1866	25 July 1866	Elected to Assembly
John Douglas	11 December 1868	13 November 1869	Resignation
Henry Fitz	23 May 1860	16 May 1873	
George Fullerton	1 May 1860	22 May 1864	Seat vacated
John Galloway	1 May 1860	1 May 1865	Resignation
John Galloway	13 November 1869	17 April 1872	
James Garrick	13 November 1869	8 December 1870	
James Gibbon	22 February 1866	19 February 1887	
St. George Richard Gore	3 July 1863	16 August 1871	
Henry Harden	10 June 1868	1 June 1870	
George Harris	23 May 1860	31 August 1876	
John Heussler	26 September 1866	8 October 1870	
William Hobbs	26 April 1861	18 October 1880	
Louis Hope	24 April 1862	1 November 1882	
Frederick Isaac	25 August 1864	12 July 1865	Death
James Laidley	1 May 1860	16 August 1864	Resignation
William Landsborough	20 December 1862	23 September 1865	Resignation
John McConnel	26 April 1861	16 July 1868	Resignation
John Frederick McDougall	1 May 1860	13 September 1895	
Robert Massie	1 May 1860	14 May 1862	Resignation
Thomas Lodge Murray-Prior	22 February 1866	31 December 1892	
Charles Nicholson	1 May 1860	23 June 1863	Returned to England
Francis North	3 July 1863	9 December 1864	Death
Albert Norton	11 September 1867	29 May 1868	Resignation
Maurice Charles O'Connell	1 May 1860	23 March 1879	
John Panton	22 February 1866	2 October 1866	Death
Ratcliffe Pring	24 April 1862	26 May 1863	Elected to Assembly
Daniel Foley Roberts	23 May 1860	26 July 1889	
Henry Simpson	29 July 1868	29 April 1882	
Stephen Simpson	23 May 1860	3 February 1865	Resignation
Richard Joseph Smith	3 July 1863	12 June 1866	Resignation
William Thornton	26 September 1866	8 September 1879	
John Watts	8 April 1864	31 October 1864	Elected to Assembly
William Duckett White	26 April 1861	5 August 1880	
Western Wood	26 April 1861	20 March 1868	Resignation
William Yaldwyn	10 June 1868	15 May 1877	
William Henry Yaldwyn	1 May 1860	13 June 1863	Resignation
William Henry Yaldwyn	1 May 1865	28 August 1866	Death
