= Members of the Queensland Legislative Council, 1900–1909 =

This is a list of members of the Queensland Legislative Council from 1 January 1900 to 31 December 1909. Appointments, made by the governor of Queensland, were for life, although many members for one reason or another resigned.

The council's size grew from 41 to 44 members, however, at times during the decade, as few as 35 members sat in the chamber. The first Labour members of the chamber were appointed under the Morgan-Kidston coalition.

== Office bearers ==
President of the Legislative Council:

- Hugh Nelson (13 April 1898 – 1 January 1906)
- Arthur Morgan (19 January 1906 – 19 December 1916)

Chairman of Committees:

- Frederic Brentnall (26 May 1893 – 22 July 1902)
- Albert Norton (23 July 1902 – 5 August 1907)
- Peter MacPherson (6 August 1907 – 12 September 1913)

== Members ==
Members shaded red were Labour Party members of the council.

Name	Date appointed	Date left	Reason for leaving
Peter Airey	3 July 1907	13 January 1908	Transferred to Assembly
William Allan	11 March 1897	19 October 1901	Death
John Annear	5 July 1902	28 May 1910	Death
William Aplin	19 October 1880	18 February 1901	Death
John Archibald	11 March 1897	20 May 1907	Death
Andrew Henry Barlow	10 June 1896	29 March 1915	Death
Thomas Beirne	27 July 1905	23 March 1922	Council abolished
William Draper Box	2 January 1874	26 January 1904	Death
Frederic Brentnall	17 April 1886	23 March 1922	Council abolished
William Villiers Brown	15 July 1901	29 April 1915	Death
Robert Bulcock	23 August 1894	10 May 1900	Death
Charles Hardie Buzacott	23 August 1894	13 May 1901	Resignation
Albert Callan	5 July 1902	9 May 1912	
William Henry Campbell	12 July 1906	17 June 1919	
Arthur John Carter	15 July 1901	6 November 1917	
Felix Clewitt	30 July 1890	13 February 1913	
James Cowlishaw	18 April 1878	15 March 1922	
Alfred Davey	12 July 1906	23 March 1922	Council abolished
John Deane	31 July 1889	27 October 1913	
James Drake	7 December 1899	13 May 1901	Transferred to Federal Parliament
Bartley Fahey	5 May 1904	9 August 1920	
John Ferguson	23 August 1894	30 March 1906	Death
William Forrest	13 May 1883	23 April 1903	Death
Angus Gibson	6 April 1899	28 May 1920	
George Wilkie Gray	23 August 1894	22 March 1922	
Augustus Gregory	10 November 1882	25 June 1905	Death
Henry Littleton Groom	12 July 1906	23 March 1922	Council abolished
Thomas Murray Hall	12 July 1906	23 March 1922	Council abolished
Frederick Hart	11 July 1872	15 July 1915	
John Heussler	13 December 1870	26 October 1907	Death
Albert Hinchcliffe	4 May 1904	23 March 1922	Council abolished
Frederick Holberton	4 July 1885	9 September 1907	Death
Magnus Jensen	4 May 1904	16 May 1915	
Thomas Alexander Johnson	4 May 1904	28 October 1914	
James Lalor	23 August 1888	11 August 1921	
William Lambert	15 March 1872	3 December 1901	Resignation
Frank McDonnell	3 July 1907	23 March 1922	Council abolished
Charles McGhie	4 May 1904	21 January 1917	
John McMaster	9 May 1899	22 July 1901	Transferred to Assembly
Peter MacPherson	1 July 1881	12 September 1913	
Charles Marks	28 November 1888	23 March 1922	Council abolished
Edward David Miles	5 July 1902	23 March 1922	Council abolished
Boyd Dunlop Morehead	10 June 1896	30 October 1905	Death
Berkeley Basil Moreton	15 July 1901	23 March 1922	Council abolished
Arthur Morgan	19 January 1906	20 December 1916	
Hugh Mosman	27 June 1891	17 January 1906	Resignation
Peter Murphy	4 May 1904	23 March 1922	Council abolished
John Murray	12 March 1901	13 November 1903	Resignation
Hugh Nelson	13 April 1898	1 January 1906	Death
Charles Nielson	14 September 1907	23 March 1922	Council abolished
Albert Norton	23 August 1894	11 March 1914	Death
Thomas O'Sullivan	24 September 1903	25 January 1906	Transferred to Assembly
Thomas O'Sullivan	18 February 1908	9 December 1915	
Arthur Horatio Parnell	3 March 1908	23 March 1922	Council abolished
Patrick Perkins	23 May 1893	17 May 1901	Death
Edmund Plant	8 June 1905	23 March 1922	Council abolished
Francis Isidore Power	15 July 1901	24 June 1912	
William Grene Power	19 September 1883	14 August 1903	Death
Alexander Raff	14 August 1884	10 June 1910	
William Rawlings	12 July 1906	5 August 1906	Death
James Thorneloe Smith	23 August 1888	14 March 1902	Death
Robert Harrison Smith	4 May 1904	11 November 1911	Death
Joseph Capel Smyth	5 May 1882	16 July 1910	
Ernest James Stevens	6 April 1899	7 September 1920	
William Taylor	17 April 1886	23 March 1922	Council abolished
Lewis Thomas	5 July 1902	16 February 1913	
Andrew Joseph Thynne	26 January 1882	23 March 1922	Council abolished
Henry Turner	3 July 1907	23 March 1922	Council abolished
John Turner	18 April 1878	29 July 1900	Death
John Webber	9 May 1899	12 March 1904	Death
Andrew Wilson	19 September 1883	29 August 1906	Death
Walter Horatio Wilson	4 July 1885	28 February 1902	Death
Henry Wood	17 April 1886	31 December 1902	Resignation
