= Members of the Queensland Legislative Council, 1890–1899 =

This is a list of members of the Queensland Legislative Council from 1 January 1890 to 31 December 1899. Appointments, made by the Governor of Queensland, were for life, although many members for one reason or another resigned.

The chamber increased in size from 38 to 41 members on 23 August 1894.

== Office bearers ==
President of the Legislative Council:

- Arthur Hunter Palmer (24 December 1881 – 20 March 1898)
- Hugh Nelson (13 April 1898 – 1 January 1906)

Chairman of Committees:

- Thomas Lodge Murray-Prior (31 July 1889 – 31 December 1892)
- Frederic Brentnall (26 May 1893 – 22 July 1902)

== Members ==
Name	Date appointed	Date left	Reason for leaving
William Allan	11 March 1897	19 October 1901	
William Aplin	19 October 1880	18 February 1901	
John Archibald	11 March 1897	20 May 1907	
Andrew Henry Barlow	10 June 1896	29 March 1915	
William Draper Box	2 January 1874	26 January 1904	
Frederic Brentnall	17 April 1886	23 March 1922	
William Brookes	27 June 1891	11 June 1897	Resignation
Robert Bulcock	23 August 1894	10 May 1900	
Charles Hardie Buzacott^{[1]}	23 August 1894	13 May 1901	
Thomas Joseph Byrnes	12 August 1890	13 March 1893	Transferred to Assembly
Felix Clewitt	30 July 1890	13 February 1913	
James Cowlishaw	18 April 1878	15 March 1922	
Thomas Bridson Cribb	23 May 1893	13 March 1896	Transferred to Assembly
John Deane	31 July 1889	27 October 1913	
James Drake	7 December 1899	13 May 1901	
John Ferguson	23 August 1894	30 March 1906	
John Clark Foote	12 May 1877	18 August 1895	Death
Edward Barrow Forrest	15 August 1882	8 March 1899	Transferred to Assembly
William Forrest	13 May 1883	23 April 1903	
James Garrick	13 November 1883	28 August 1894	Seat vacated
Angus Gibson	6 April 1899	28 May 1920	
William Graham	5 August 1880	7 June 1892	Death
George Wilkie Gray	23 August 1894	22 March 1922	
Augustus Gregory	10 November 1882	25 June 1905	
Frederick Hart	11 July 1872	15 July 1915	
John Heussler	13 December 1870	26 October 1907	
Frederick Holberton	4 July 1885	9 September 1907	
George King	26 January 1882	19 March 1890	Resignation
James Lalor	23 August 1888	11 August 1921	
William Lambert	15 March 1872	3 December 1901	
John Macansh	17 April 1886	1 August 1896	Death
Thomas MacDonald-Paterson	22 April 1885	11 March 1896	Transferred to Assembly
John Frederick McDougall	1 May 1860	13 September 1895	Resignation
John McMaster	9 May 1899	22 July 1901	
Peter MacPherson	1 July 1881	12 September 1913	
Charles Marks	28 November 1888	23 March 1922	
Boyd Dunlop Morehead^{[1]}	10 June 1896	30 October 1905	
Berkeley Basil Moreton	25 May 1888	25 June 1891	Resignation
Hugh Mosman	27 June 1891	17 January 1906	
Thomas Lodge Murray-Prior	22 February 1866	31 December 1892	Death
Hugh Nelson	13 April 1898	1 January 1906	
Albert Norton^{[1]}	23 August 1894	11 March 1914	
Arthur Hunter Palmer	24 December 1881	20 March 1898	Death
Patrick Perkins	23 May 1893	17 May 1901	Death
William Perry	22 September 1890	11 June 1891	Death
William Pettigrew	12 May 1877	23 June 1894	Seat vacated
William Grene Power	19 September 1883	14 August 1903	Death
Alexander Raff	14 August 1884	10 June 1910	
John Scott	23 August 1888	26 June 1890	Resignation
James Thorneloe Smith	23 August 1888	14 March 1902	
Joseph Smyth	5 May 1882	16 July 1910	
Ernest James Stevens	6 April 1899	7 September 1920	
James Swan	18 April 1878	26 May 1891	Death
James Taylor	4 November 1871	17 August 1893	Resignation
William Taylor	17 April 1886	23 March 1922	
Andrew Joseph Thynne	26 January 1882	23 March 1922	
John Turner	18 April 1878	29 July 1900	
James Tyson	23 May 1893	4 December 1898	Death
John Webber	9 May 1899	12 March 1904	
Andrew Wilson	19 September 1883	29 August 1906	
Walter Horatio Wilson	4 July 1885	28 February 1902	
Henry Wood	17 April 1886	31 December 1902	

^{1} The following had served previous terms before the appointment indicated:

- Charles Hardie Buzacott: 21 January 1879 – 5 July 1882
- Boyd Dunlop Morehead: 31 December 1880 – 3 August 1883
- Albert Norton: 11 September 1867 – 29 May 1868
