= Alfred Compigne =

Australian politician

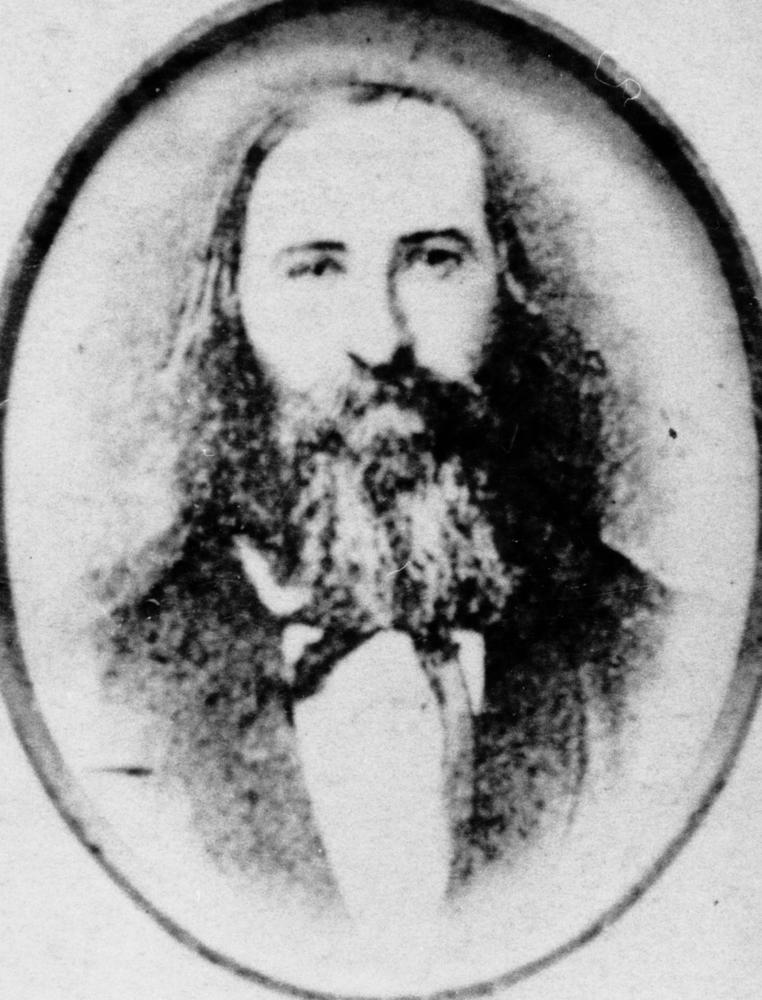

Member of the Queensland Legislative Council
- In office 1 May 1860 – 23 April 1864

Personal details
- Born: Alfred William Compigne; 7 February 1818 Gosford, Hampshire, England
- Died: 4 July 1909 (aged 91) Brisbane, Queensland, Australia
- Resting place: Toowong Cemetery
- Spouse: Jessie Collins (m.1852 d.1911)
- Occupation: Pastoralist, Police magistrate

Alfred William Compigne (February 7, 1818 – July 4, 1909) was a settler and politician of Queensland, Australia. He was a Member of the Queensland Legislative Council.

== Early life ==
Alfred William Compigné was born at Gosport, Hampshire, England on 2 February 1818. He immigrated to Sydney, New South Wales on 30 June 1839, coming to Queensland in 1846.

Alfred Compigné acquired Nindooinbah Station on the Albert River and was the first pastoralist to take up land on the coast south of Coomera. He applied successfully for the leasehold of two properties to the south of Brisbane settlement being Dungogie and Murry Jerry runs in March 1852. Just five months later in August 1952 he transferred the coastal runs to William Duckett White of Beaudesert Station. In his footnotes regarding Compigne, Longhurst accounts that while Compigne ran up to 7,000 sheep on Nindooinbah Station he eventually failed as a squatter.

== Politics ==
Compigne was appointed as a founding Member of the Queensland Legislative Council on 1 May 1860. He served for four years before resigning on 23 April 1864.

== Later life ==
Compigne died from senile decay at his residence, Richmond Villa, on Sunday 4 July 1909 and was buried in Toowong Cemetery.

== See also ==
- Members of the Queensland Legislative Council, 1860–1869
