= Harris Terrace, Brisbane =

Heritage-listed building in Brisbane, Queensland

Harris Terrace
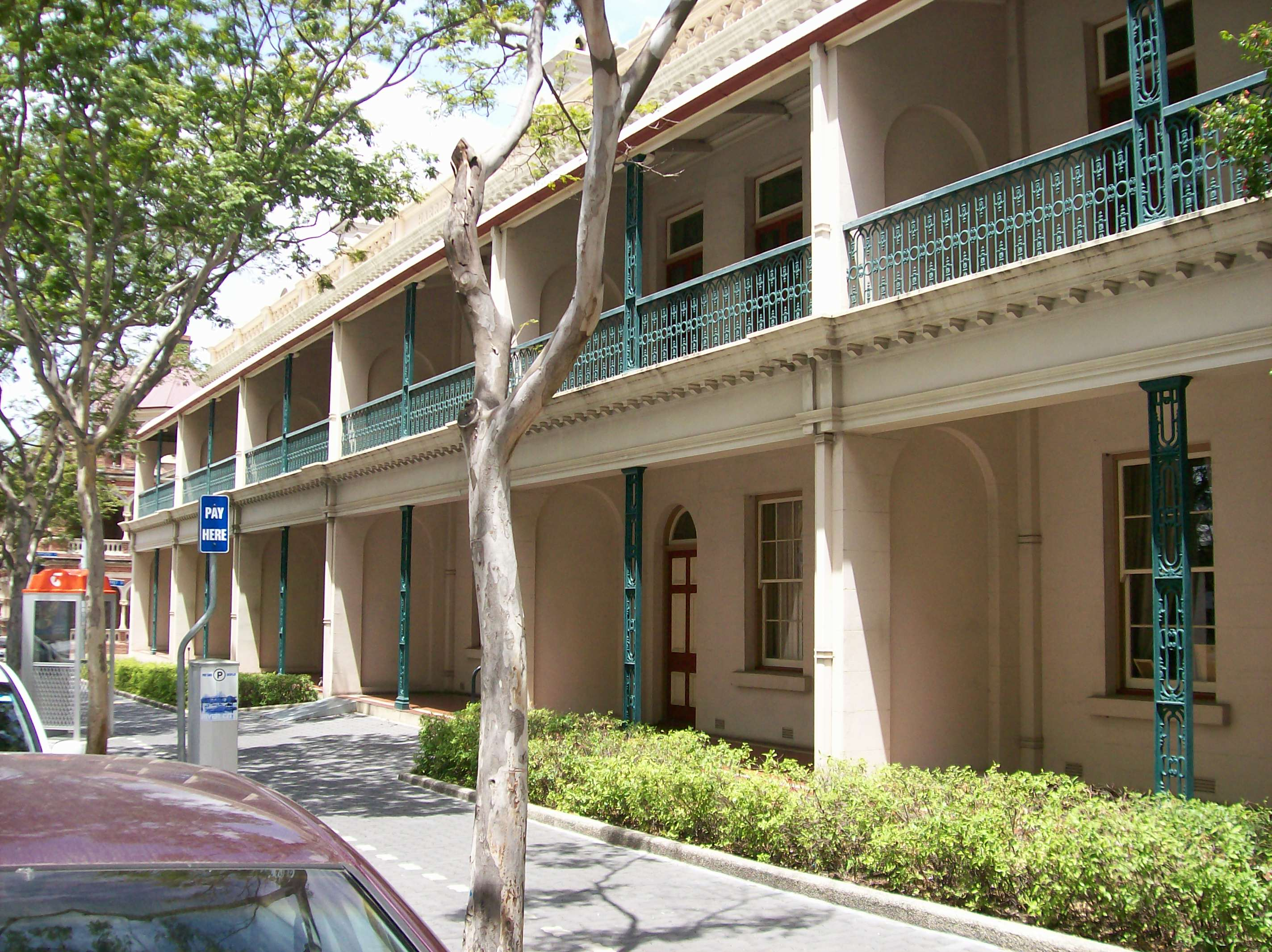
- Harris Terrace, 2007

- Location within Queensland Location within Australia
- 27.4739°S 153.0261°E
- Location: 68 George Street, Brisbane City, City of Brisbane, Queensland, Australia

History
- Design period: 1840s–1860s (mid-19th century)
- Built: c. 1866–c. 1867
- Built for: George Harris

Site notes
- Architect: J & G Cowlishaw
- Architectural style: Georgian

Queensland Heritage Register
- Official name: Harris Terrace, Harris Court
- Type: state heritage (built)
- Designated: 21 October 1992
- Reference no.: 600121
- Significant components: attic, residential accommodation – terrace house/terrace, residential accommodation – servants' quarters
- Builders: Mr Clarke

Harris Terrace is a heritage-listed terrace house at 68 George Street, Brisbane City, City of Brisbane, Queensland, Australia. It was designed by J & G Cowlishaw and built from c. 1866 to c. 1867 by Mr Clarke. It is also known as Harris Court. It was added to the Queensland Heritage Register on 21 October 1992.

== History ==
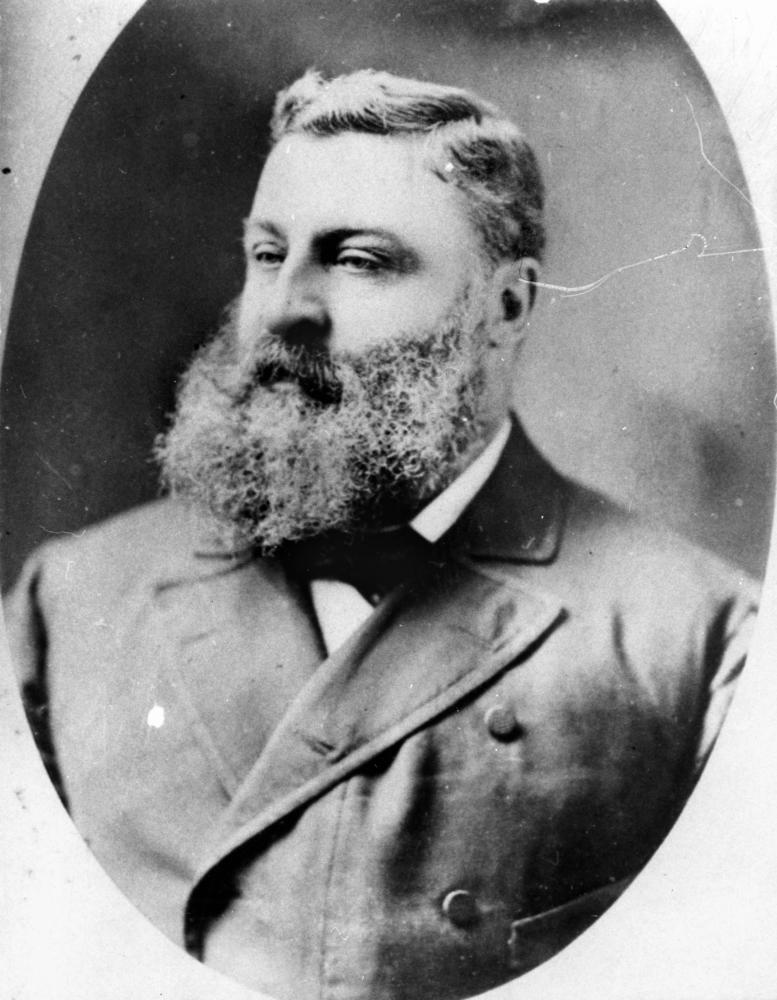
George Harris MLC, circa 1870

Harris Terrace is a two-storey masonry building in George Street. Formerly a residential terrace of six houses, it was constructed in the mid-1860s for George Harris and was designed by architect James Cowlishaw.

Since the 1820s, the north bank and adjacent ridgeline of the Brisbane River, now containing William and George streets, has featured a concentration of government and associated activities and uses. Over the period of the Moreton Bay penal settlement, buildings were constructed along this ridgeline, utilised by government officials for "accommodation, administration and control". When the area was opened for free settlement in 1842, the remnant penal infrastructure was used by surveyors as a basis for the layout for the new town of Brisbane. Set at right angles to the river, the prisoner's barracks determined Queen Street, while the line of buildings along the ridge determined William Street. Streets surveyed parallel to these streets, including George Street, formed Brisbane's rectangular grid.

While a range of buildings and activities occurred along George and William Streets and the north bank from the 1840s, the government maintained a dominant presence in the area. At some sites (such as the Commissariat Store and the City Botanic Gardens), earlier uses were continued. The establishment phase following the separation of Queensland in 1859 saw the new colonial government reserve land parcels and construct a range of buildings to facilitate its functions. The building of the first Government House and Parliament House at the eastern end of George Street in the 1860s firmly entrenched the physical reality of a government precinct in the area.

The location of Parliament House had a pronounced effect on the built environment around lower George Street. Many of Queensland's early politicians were pastoralists, a reflection of their economic dominance in the colony. Together with a growing workforce of public servants, these politicians required accommodation when in Brisbane. From the 1860s to the 1880s, a range of buildings, many built by, or for politicians, were constructed to address these needs.

Harris Terrace was erected as a speculative investment for George Harris. Harris (1831–1891) was born in London, migrated with his family to Sydney in 1833 and came to Brisbane in 1848 to work with his elder brother John. The partnership of John and George Harris, general merchants and shipping agents, was established in 1853, with the firm involved in importing goods and exporting wool and tallow. George Harris became a well-known business and society figure in Brisbane. Following Queensland's separation from New South Wales in 1859 he was appointed a member of the first Queensland Legislative Council, serving until August 1878.

The first half of the 1860s was a period of strong growth for Brisbane. Immigration boosted the population dramatically (more than doubling between 1861 and 1864 to over 12,000) and many substantial public and private buildings were constructed during this time. The permanent nature of the buildings was also partly influenced by provisions in the Municipalities Act 1864, which required brick or stone construction and non-flammable roofing material in designated first class building areas.

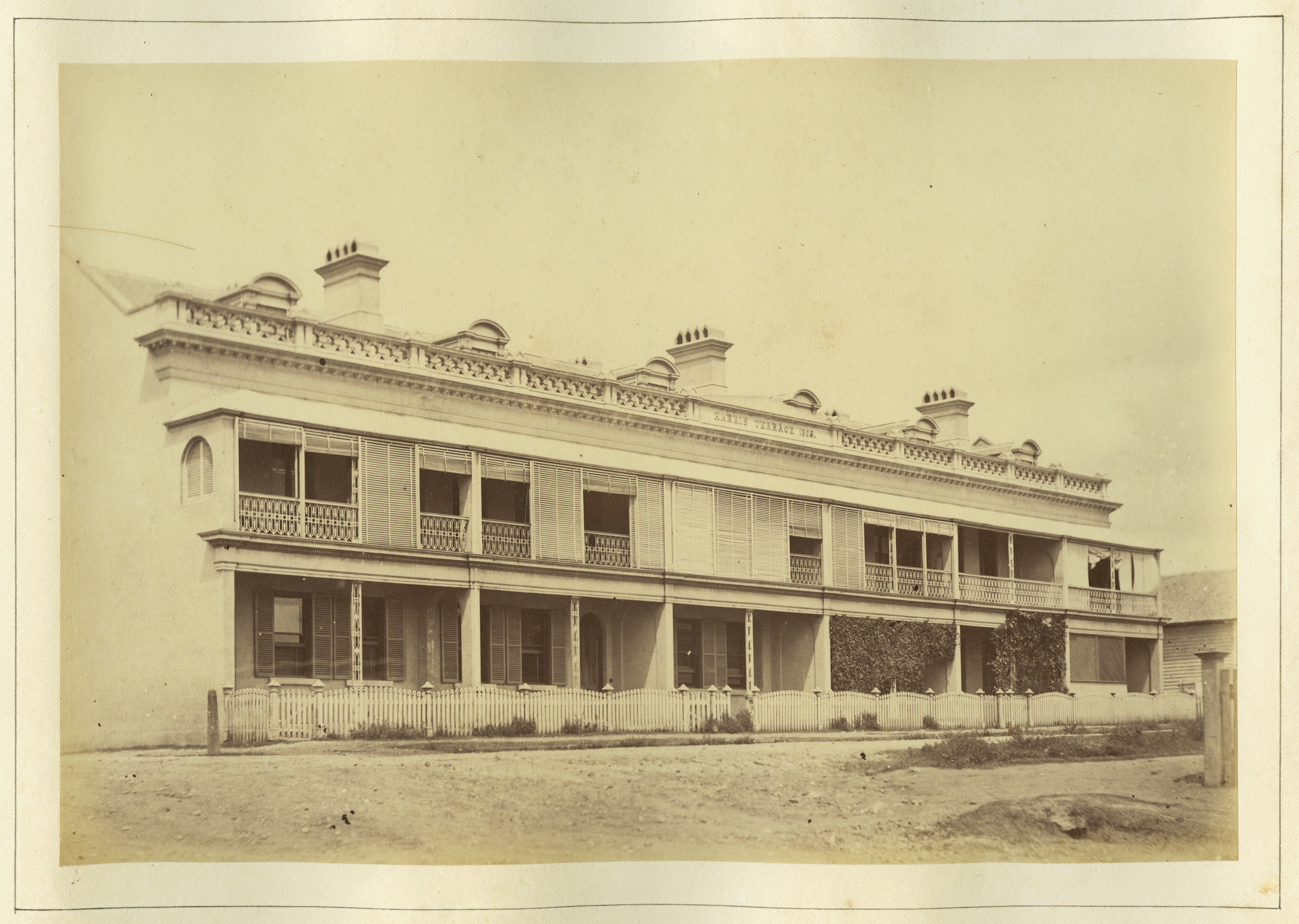
Harris Terrace, circa 1869

In 1865 Harris commissioned architect James Cowlishaw to design a terrace building of six self-contained residences on the south-west corner of George and Margaret streets. The property, originally surveyed as allotment 1 of section 9, had been previously owned by John Betts, a property speculator who bought the land at one of Brisbane's earliest land sales in Sydney in 1842. It is unclear if any improvements were made to the land prior to Harris purchasing the property in 1856. Cowlishaw, considered Brisbane's "first successful private architect" arrived in 1860 from Sydney and soon became highly regarded and in demand. Prior to designing the terrace, Cowlishaw undertook other design work for Harris and his firm, including improvements to J&G Harris' wharf and stores at nearby Short Street, a new Ipswich warehouse, and repairs and additions to his then residence, Newstead House. In 1861 Cowlishaw also designed a terrace building on the opposite corner of George and Margaret Streets for another politician, Arthur Hodgson.

Terrace houses were an urban residential building type that came to Australia from England in the early nineteenth century. Essentially narrow fronted adjoining houses, terraces were built as dwellings for people across the classes, as was reflected in their respective forms, scales, materials and settings. While fairly common in mid-to-late 19th century suburbs of Sydney and Melbourne, terraces were always fewer in number in Brisbane. Those that were constructed were largely in the centre of Brisbane, or in nearby residential areas like Spring Hill and Petrie Terrace.

The Undue Subdivision of Land Prevention Act 1885, introduced to avoid "slum" conditions in areas of medium density dwellings, effectively limited the construction of terraces in Queensland. The limit of a minimum size of 16 perches (400 m^{2}) for allotment subdivisions firmly established the detached house as the standard dwelling. While some terrace houses were built by property speculators as rentals in Brisbane after 1885 (most notably The Mansions ), these dwellings could not be sold individually. Other than Harris Terrace, only two other terrace houses constructed in the 1860s, Athol Place, Spring Hill and Princess Row, Petrie Terrace, survive in Brisbane.

Cowlishaw first advertised for whole or separate tenders for the construction of Harris Terrace, described as "six first class houses", in July 1865. He readvertised in February 1866, again requesting the erection of the six houses "at the risk of the former contractor". When the building was completed, a Mr Clarke was identified as the contractor, with the cost of construction £8000. The building was advertised in December 1866 as ready for occupation from 1 January 1867. Shortly after, the building was described as, "...substantially built, possessing an imposing exterior presence, and the interior arrangements contain all the requisites of a well-finished dwelling house of the mother-country, combined with the protection required by a warm climate...".

When completed, Harris Terrace was a two-storey brick building with an attic level in the roof space. In each of the six houses, the ground floor contained drawing and living rooms, with bedrooms on the first floor and in the attic. To the rear, two storey outbuildings housed the kitchen, bathroom and maid's room. A slate roof with dormer windows were partly concealed by a balustraded parapet, inscribed with "Harris Terrace 1866" at its centre. A cast iron balustrade and full length venetian blinds featured on the upper balcony.

Early tenants of Harris Terrace who were parliamentary politicians included Joshua Bell, William Yaldwyn and Kevin O'Doherty. Other early tenants, Mrs Unsworth (no. 5) and Mrs and Miss de Villers (no. 3) ran girls schools in 1867, with the latter offering rooms for boarders. By mid-1868 Harris Terrace was promoted as having "already acquired the reputation of being the best private residences in the city". Along with politicians, medical professionals and senior public servants also numbered among early residents. The houses were individually numbered and some were given their own name.

Following insolvency in 1876, George Harris surrendered Harris Terrace to mortgagee James Taylor, a Darling Downs landholder and politician. In 1887 the property was acquired by two other members of Parliament, Boyd Morehead and William Pattison who both lived at Harris Terrace at this time. The following year Morehead and Pattison, with another politician John Stevenson, commissioned the building of The Mansions – Brisbane's most elaborate terrace house, adjacent to Harris Terrace on the opposite corner of George and Margaret streets.

The use of the houses in Harris Terrace for accommodation continued into the first decades of the twentieth century. From the mid-1880s some of the individual houses became boarding houses. By the 1920s all of the houses contained in Harris Terrace were being utilised for boarding, often called "residential chambers". In 1922 Frank, Jessie and Ethel Lingley bought the building and changed the name to "Harris Court". The Undue Subdivision of Land Prevention Act was repealed in 1923 and from this time individual titles were created for houses at Harris Court. The Lingleys retained the house on the Margaret Street corner adapting it into a cafe and building an extension to the footpath. The Royal Queensland Art Society acquired one of the houses in 1924. House no. 5 (fifth from the Margaret Street corner) had by the 1940s been altered with a two-storey extension to the George street alignment, with an awning over the footpath.

The immediate post-war years of the late 1940s saw the Queensland Government expand their activities considerably in Brisbane City. Most public servants were then located in the Treasury Building and Executive Building (later the Land Administration Building) in George Street and in offices in the Anzac Square Building. The shortage of office accommodation in the centre of Brisbane, and the need to address future requirements, led to a phase of governmental property acquisition in the city. The purchase of properties on George and William Streets between the Queensland Government Printing Office and Parliament House was a key focus, in addition to other acquisitions on Charlotte, Mary and Margaret streets. Harris Court was purchased around this time. Despite their varying condition and former uses, the shortage of office space saw many of these newly acquired buildings quickly adapted for government use.

Because Harris Court was bought with the existing leases, it was not until the mid-1950s that the last tenants left the building. In 1958, architect John Hitch, in association with architects from the Department of Public Works, prepared plans to adapt Harris Court for government use. The original service wings and outbuildings to the rear were demolished and a new steel framed, sawtooth annexe, connected to the earlier structure was constructed, containing open plan office spaces.

Major alterations occurred to the original building in 1960–61, including the removal of the upper balconies and ground floor verandahs, construction of an enclosure on the street alignment linking the houses, and the replacement of the front doors of four of the six houses by windows, leaving entrances at either end of the building. Original windows were removed or replaced, barrel vaulted dormers replaced with gabled dormers, and chimney and fireplace openings were bricked in. The interiors of Harris Court were also substantially altered. Three of the original six staircases were removed, and whole walls and sections of party walls were removed for full length corridors on both floor levels. A range of government offices were accommodated in the old building and annexe following the completion of works.

The consolidation of government ownership and usage along George and William streets led to the state investigating a number of schemes to further the development of a "government precinct". By 1965, a masterplan had been developed involving the demolition of all buildings between the old Executive Building and Parliament House, to enable the construction of three 15-storey office buildings in a "plaza setting". The present day Executive Building was completed in 1971 as part of this plan. By the early 1970s this plan for the precinct was considered no longer suitable and a number of other proposals for the area were explored.

A 1974 "George Street Masterplan" involved lower rise buildings spread out over greater areas, some retention of existing buildings and the demolition of the Bellevue Hotel (opposite Parliament House) and adjacent The Mansions. A major influence in ultimately shaping the layout of the area during the 1970s was the growing community support for the retention of older buildings within the government precinct, especially the Bellevue Hotel and The Mansions. Spearheaded by the National Trust, the government-related associations and links between buildings, their architectural qualities, and aesthetic contributions to the area were highlighted in submissions to the government and in the public sphere. The unannounced June 1974 removal of the balconies of the Belle Vue Hotel was a deliberate action by the Queensland Government to degrade the visual appearance of the area, and drew further attention to the conservation cause.

In April 1979 Cabinet adopted a recommendation for a schedule of demolition work to progress the development of the government precinct. The Bellevue Hotel was to be demolished, but The Mansions and the original section of Harris Court were to be retained, renovated and adapted. On 21 April, three days after this decision, the Bellevue Hotel was demolished in the early hours of the morning, a notorious event in the history of heritage conservation in Queensland.

Harris Court (together with The Mansions) was retained in the forecourt of the State Works Centre (80 George Street), a seven level building on two George Street blocks (bridged across Margaret Street) completed in 1985. As part of this project, renovations and major reconstructions were undertaken at Harris Terrace involving architects from the Department of Public Works in association with Conrad and Gargett Architects. Work included the reconstruction of the ground floor verandah and upper floor balcony; new iron columns and balustrade on the balcony similar to the originals; a new slate roof, reinstatement of front entrance doors (not all operable) and vaulted dormers (made larger than the originals at the rear); installation of new doors, windows, architraves and skirtings of earlier forms and profiles; and new moulded ceilings on the ground and first floors. It was at this time the building reverted to its original name of "Harris Terrace".

Since this time only minor alterations have occurred. In 2012 Harris Terrace provides offices spaces for a number of community organisations.

== Description ==
Harris Terrace is a row of six, brick, two storeyed attached former houses, located on the corner of George and Margaret streets within the government precinct.

The street facade features a double-storeyed verandah with cast iron balusters and posts. The verandah is separated into six sections reflecting the original six houses. Each section has three French doors on the first floor, and two sash windows and the front door on the ground floor.

The parapet incorporates a central plaque with the name of the building and date of construction. The tiled gable roof features six chimneys and dormers with barrel shaped roofs and the bull nose verandah roof is corrugated iron.

The rear elevation includes four short double-storeyed wings which form shallow courtyards. The first floor windows in the wings have round arches while the rear windows of the main building are flat arched. The roof dormers have barrel vaults and the wings are gabled.

The interior consists of modern offices opening onto a central hallway which runs the length of the building.

== Heritage listing ==
Harris Terrace was listed on the Queensland Heritage Register on 21 October 1992 having satisfied the following criteria.

The place is important in demonstrating the evolution or pattern of Queensland's history.

Harris Terrace, constructed as a row of six houses in 1865–66, is important in demonstrating the evolution of residential housing in Queensland. A rare example of 1860s terrace housing, the building illustrates the early use of this housing type in Brisbane.

Harris Terrace is important in demonstrating the early residential nature of lower George Street, a pattern that largely occurred in response to the concentration of government and associated activities in this area of inner Brisbane.

The place demonstrates rare, uncommon or endangered aspects of Queensland's cultural heritage.

As one of only three remaining 1860s terrace house buildings, Harris Terrace is important as a rare example of this type in Queensland. Beyond its rarity as terrace housing, Harris Terrace is one of few remaining 1860s buildings in Brisbane City.

The place has potential to yield information that will contribute to an understanding of Queensland's history.

Harris Terrace has potential to contribute to a greater understanding of Queensland's history. The area immediately behind the building may contain archaeological evidence including the foundations of the service wings and 1960s building additions. Artefacts within this area may include those commonly associated with domestic habitation such as glass, ceramics and bone, and some artefacts associated with commercial and office activity during the 20th century.

The place is important because of its aesthetic significance.

In its dignified front elevation, form and scale, Harris Terrace is an important element of lower George Street, a streetscape dominated by late nineteenth-century buildings. More widely, the building makes an important contribution to the government precinct that exists between George Street and the Brisbane River.
