= John Heussler =

Australian politician

The Hon John Heussler
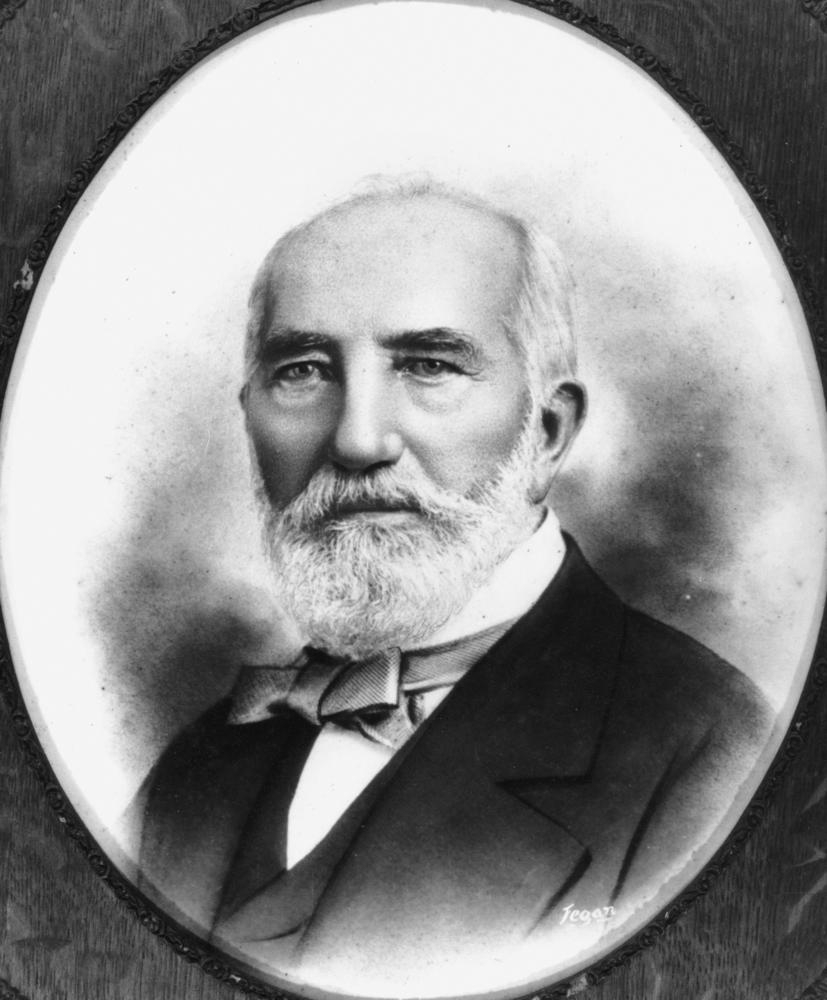
- Johann Christian Heussler

Member of the Queensland Legislative Council
- In office 26 September 1866 – 8 October 1870
- In office 13 December 1870 – 26 October 1907

Personal details
- Born: Johann Christian Heussler; 15 June 1820 Bockenheim, Frankfurt am Main, Germany
- Died: 26 October 1907 (aged 87) Brisbane, Queensland, Australia
- Resting place: Toowong Cemetery
- Spouse: Sophia Esther Westgarth (d.1914)
- Occupation: Wine merchant, Diplomatic service

Johann Christian "John" Heussler (1820–1907) was a German-born businessman and politician in Queensland, Australia. He was a Member of the Queensland Legislative Council.

== Early life ==
Johann Christian Heussler was born at Bockenheim, Frankfurt, Germany on 15 June 1820. He was educated at the state school, and was subsequently a student at a French institution at Bockenheim, and Dr. Jeiteles's Mercantile Institute at Frankfurt. He entered in business as a wine merchant at Frankfurt, and later on, while still young, received an important appointment in a mercantile firm in Holland, representing the firm at the London Exhibition in 1851. He emigrated to Australia in 1852, and established a business, in partnership with others, in Melbourne.

== Business interests ==
Due to poor health he moved to Brisbane 1854 and established the mercantile firm Heussler and Co. Over two decades Heussler became a highly respected business man and citizen of Queensland. He was recognised as a founding member of the Queensland Club, Consul for the Netherlands, German Consul, and Emigration Agent for German shipping companies.

== Politics ==
Heussler was appointed to the Queensland Legislative Council on 26 September 1866. Although a lifetime appointment, his seat was declared vacant on 8 October 1870 due to his absence from Queensland. However, he was reappointed on 13 December 1870 and remained on the Council until his death on 26 October 1907. As a member of the council, he acted as President, as (acting) Chairman of Committee, and as a Commissioner at the opening of Parliament at various times.

While Robert Herbert was Queensland Premier, John Heussler was sent to Germany as an immigration agent, resulting in prosperous German and Scandinavian (mainly Danish) settlements in the Rosewood, Logan River, Albert River, Darling Downs, Maryborough, Hervey Bay, Kolan and other districts.

== Fernberg ==
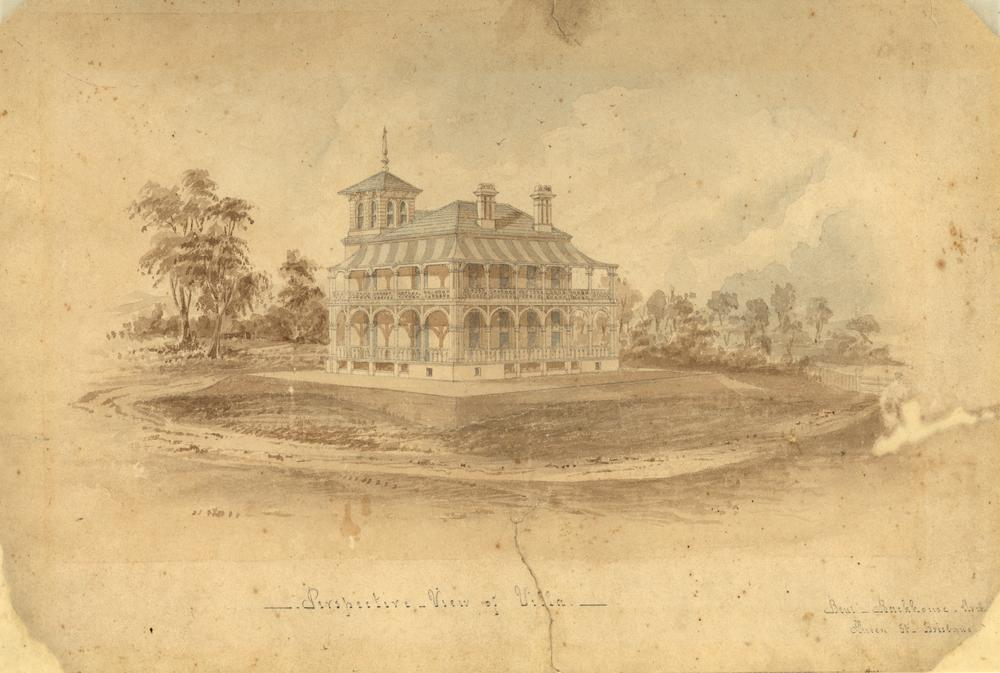
Perspective drawing of Villa Fernberg, by Benjamin Backhouse, circa 1864

In May 1860 Heussler purchased a portion of land (Portion 223) high on a hill on what was most likely undeveloped natural bushland (but later the suburb of Rosalie, now Paddington). He purchased the adjoining Portion 291 two years later in partnership with George Reinhard Francksen. In 1864 Francksen died and the land passed to Heussler.

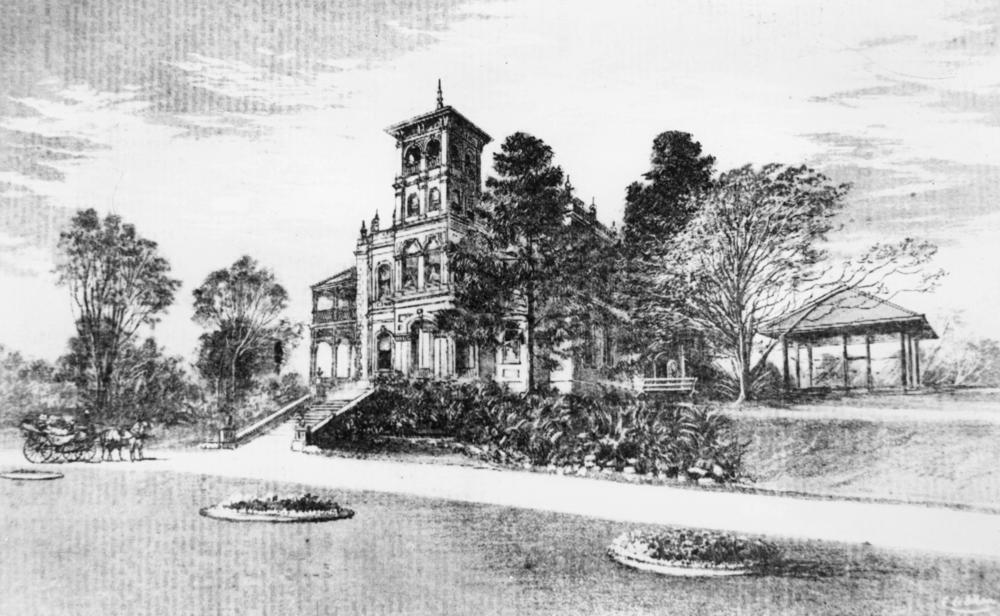
Drawing of Fernberg house, 1891

Heussler is believed to have built his home Fernberg on that land in 1865, giving it a name of German origin that meant "distant mountain". The design of the house is attributed to Benjamin Backhouse, an architect responsible for several substantial commissions in Queensland, New South Wales and Victoria. Local examples of his work include other villa residences such as Baroona, Cintra House, Riversleigh (on North Quay) for Edward Tufnell and Old Bishopsbourne. Due to financial difficulties, Heussler was forced to leave the property in 1872 and for the next five years Fernberg was leased. In November 1877 the estate was advertised for sale. The house and grounds were described as being:

"Built of brick and stone, being four stories high, having below kitchen and servants' room; on the ground floor spacious drawing, dining, and breakfast rooms; on the first floor three large bedrooms, and one large room on the second floor. The roof is covered with slates, the verandahs and balconies being spacious, and presenting a delightful retreat for the enjoyment of pure air, shade and widespread and charming view. The grounds are all enclosed, the timber having been thinned so to give the place a park-like appearance, and there is a shrubbery and garden around the house."

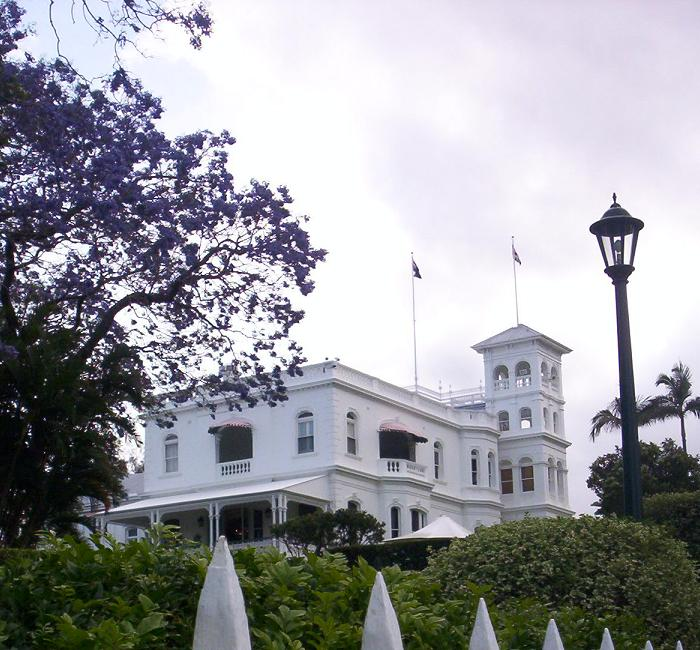
Fernberg, circa 2005

In February 1910, the Queensland Government decided to lease Fernberg as a temporary residence for the Governor of Queensland following the formal dedication of the original Government House as the University of Queensland on 10 December 1909. At the same time, plans for a new Government House to be erected at Victoria Park were being prepared; however work on the new house never progressed beyond the construction of footings. In June 1911, despite reports that the residence was too small, the government purchased Fernberg as Queensland's Government House which it remains to this day (albeit considerably modified and extended over the years).

== Later life ==
John Heussler died on Saturday 26 October 1907 at his home Unthank at Christian Street, Albion (now Clayfield). His funeral moved from his home to the Toowong Cemetery.

== Family ==
Heussler married Sophia Esther Westgarth (c. 1824 – 5 June 1914) on 10 March 1859. Their children include:

- Frederick John Heussler (c. 1860 – 26 June 1939) married Kate Chatfield; they had two sons and two daughters.
- William James Heussler (c. 1862 – 27 February 1948) married Amy Constance Henry (c. 1862 – 28 July 1936) on 23 November 1892; they had two sons and two daughters. Amy Constance Heussler was a prominent feminist, a founder of United Associations, temperance and peace activist.
- Louise Christine Heussler married John Cameron on 27 December 1899.

== See also ==
- Members of the Queensland Legislative Council, 1860–1869; 1870–1879; 1880–1889; 1890–1899; 1900–1909
