= John Frederick McDougall =

Australian politician

The Hon John McDougall
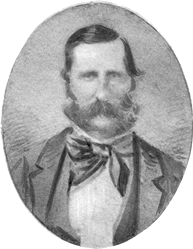

Member of the Queensland Legislative Council
- In office 1 May 1860 – 1 May 1865

Personal details
- Born: John Frederick McDougall; 31 August 1820 Parramatta, New South Wales, Australia
- Died: 11 November 1896 (aged 76) Sandgate, Queensland, Australia
- Resting place: Toowong Cemetery
- Spouse: Catherine Maria D'Arcy (m.1846 d.1900)
- Occupation: Land owner, Grazier

John Frederick McDougall (1820—1896) was a pastoralist and politician in Queensland, Australia. He was a Member of the Queensland Legislative Council.

== Early life ==
John Frederick McDougall was born on 31 August 1820 in Parramatta, New South Wales, the son of John Kerr McDougall and his wife Louisa (née Doyle). He attended The King's School, Parramatta.

On 31 July 1846 at St John's Church, Parramatta, McDougall married Catherine Maria D'Arcy, the daughter of Major D'Arcy of the 28th Regiment. The couple had 8 sons and 2 daughters.

McDougall arrived in Moreton Bay, Queensland accompanied by Mrs D'Arcy on the steamer Shamrock on 28 October 1855.

McDougall was one of the early pioneers on the Darling Downs where he was the long-time owner of Rosalie pastoral station. He was also associated with a number of other pastoral stations including Texas, Rosalie Plains and Cooyar.

McDougall was one of the original purchasers of the (now) St Johns Wood estate in Brisbane, which McDougall used as a cattle station.

McDougall also had land holdings in the Milton and Paddington areas in Brisbane. The neighbourhood of Rosalie in Brisbane takes its name from McDougall's Rosalie pastoral station. In 1855, he purchased Milton House built by chemist Ambrose Eldridge (the house and associated Milton Farm give the name to the suburb of Milton). The McDougall family lived there until about 1864, after which they continued to own the property but leased it to various tenants until selling the property in 1887.

In 1863, McDougall was one of the founders and original trustees of the Queensland Turf Club, having arranged a land grant of 322 acres of land at Eagle Farm in Brisbane for the purpose of horse racing, now known as the Eagle Farm Racecourse. The other trustees were Maurice O'Connell and George Harris (all three were Members of the Queensland Legislative Council).

== Politics ==
McDougall was appointed for five years to the Queensland Legislative Council from 1 May 1860 to 1 May 1865. He was then re-appointed for life from 1 May 1865 until he resigned on 13 September 1895 due to failing health.

McDougall also served as a councillor on the Rosalie Divisional Board and was its first chairman in 1880. He served as President of the Legislative Council. He was also acting Lieutenant-Governor on one occasion.

== Later life ==
In 1875, McDougall was one of the founding trustees of the Toowoomba Grammar School.

In 1891, McDougall was the founding president of the Darling Downs Pastoralists' Association (which later became the Graziers' Association of South-East Queensland).

McDougall retired in about 1894 and was shortly after seized by paralysis. He died on Wednesday 11 November 1896 at Sandgate. He was buried on Thursday 12 November 1896 in the Toowong Cemetery.

== See also ==
- Members of the Queensland Legislative Council, 1860–1869; 1870–1879; 1880–1889; 1890–1899
