= Francis Thomas Gregory =

Australian politician (1821–1888)

The Hon Frank Gregory
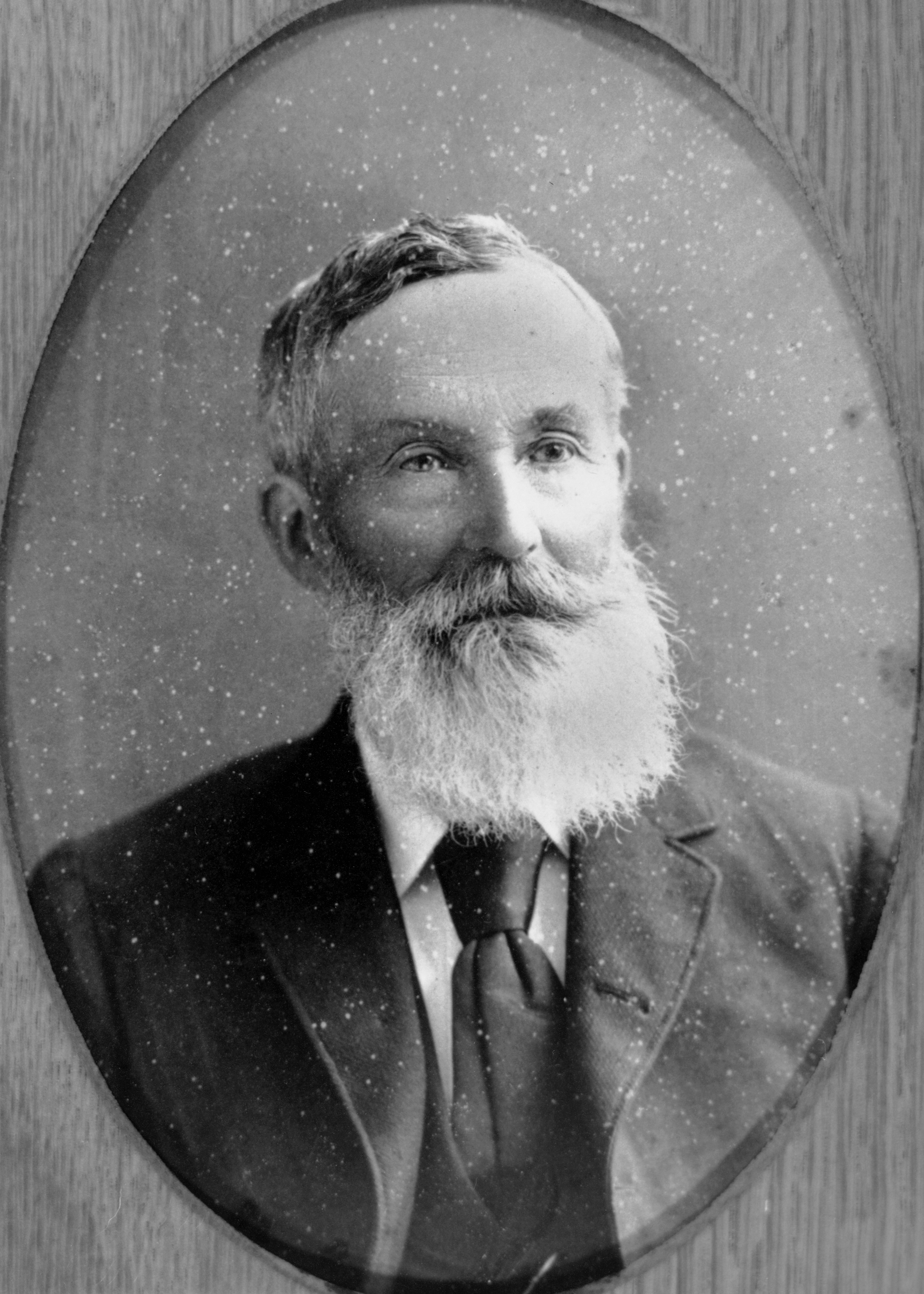

Member of the Queensland Legislative Council
- In office 2 January 1874 – 23 October 1888

Personal details
- Born: Francis Thomas Gregory; 19 October 1821 Farnsfield, Nottinghamshire, England
- Died: 23 October 1888 (aged 67) Harlaxton House, Toowoomba, Queensland, Australia
- Resting place: Drayton and Toowoomba Cemetery
- Spouse: Marion Scott Hume (m.1865)
- Relations: Joshua Gregory (father), Augustus Charles Gregory (brother)
- Occupation: Surveyor
- Known for: Exploration of Australia

Francis Thomas "Frank" Gregory (19 October 1821 – 23 October 1888) was an Australian explorer and politician.

Born in England, he emigrated with his family to Australia as a boy. He was the younger brother of the explorer and politician Augustus Gregory, who also made his career in the colony.

== Biography ==
Gregory was born at Farnsfield, Nottinghamshire, England in 1821. His family, including his older brother Augustus, emigrated to Western Australia in 1829. After getting a basic education, Gregory entered the Western Australian public service in 1841 as a cadet surveyor.

In 1846, Gregory accompanied his older brother Augustus and explorer Henry Churchman, to investigate the country north of Perth. The following year, Gregory was appointed an assistant government surveyor; two years later he was promoted to staff surveyor in 1849.

In 1857 he led expeditions to the upper Murchison River, and to country farther east and north in 1858.

The next year Gregory visited England, to lobby the British government for funding towards exploration of North-West Australia. Gregory believed that the region might support grazing and/or plantation agriculture, based on the use of indentured labour from Asia.

In 1860, the Government of Western Australia put Gregory in charge of a proposed expedition to explore the interior around Nickol Bay. The southwestern part of this region was later known as the Pilbara. The British government provided £2,000 towards expenses.

After reaching the Fortescue River, the expedition followed it for several days, before turning to the south-west and following the Hardey River.

Gregory returned with his party on 17 October and the expedition returned to Perth, which it reached on 9 November 1861. Gregory reported that he had seen between two and three million acres (1.2 million hectares) of land suitable for grazing. He also drew attention to the possibility of a pearling industry being established. As a result of the expedition to Nickol Bay, Gregory was awarded the Gold Medal of the Royal Geographical Society (1863).

In 1862 Gregory moved to Queensland, where his brother Augustus was already prominent as an explorer and official. Francis Gregory was appointed as a Commissioner of Crown Lands. He married Marion Hume in 1865, the sister of his surveying friend and protégé, Walter C. Hume. From 1874, he was elected and served as a member of the Queensland Legislative Council. For a short period during 1883, he served as the appointed Postmaster-General of Queensland.

== Death and legacy ==
Gregory died at Toowoomba on 23 October 1888 and was buried in Drayton and Toowoomba Cemetery.

The exploration journals and records of Augustus and Francis Gregory were published in 1884 by the Queensland government as Journals of Australian Explorations.

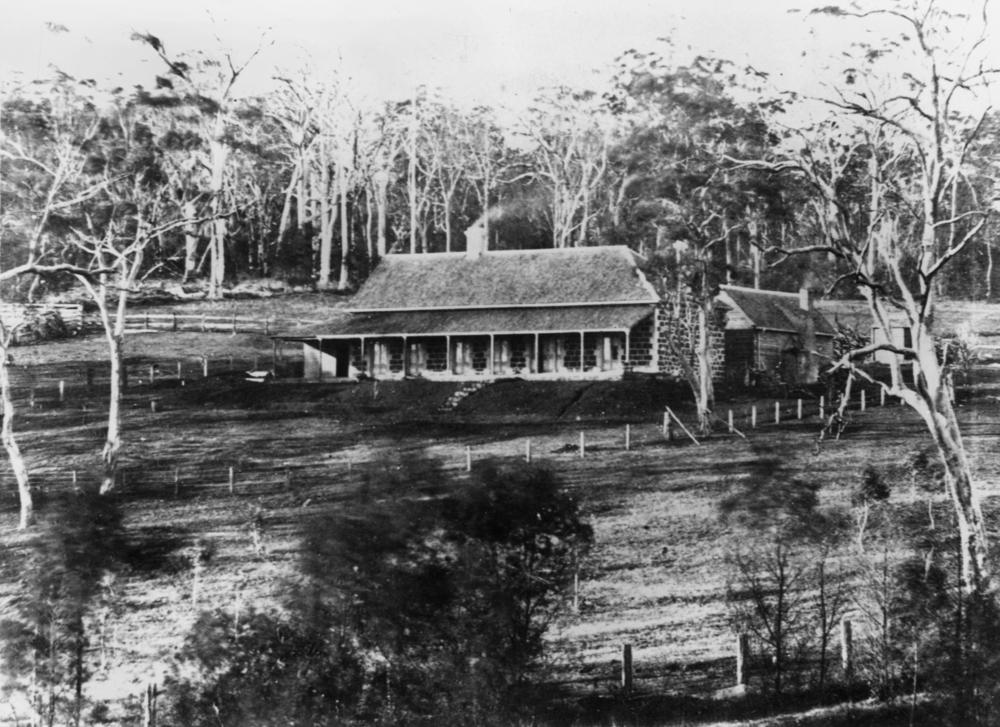
Harlaxton in Toowoomba, c. 1870

His Toowoomba home, Harlaxton House, is listed on the Queensland Heritage Register.

Acacia gregorii, also known as Gregory's wattle, was collected in the Pilbara during the 1861 expedition, and is named in his honour.

== See also ==
- Members of the Queensland Legislative Council, 1870–1879; 1880–1889
