= Claudius Buchanan Whish =

Australian politician

The Hon Claudius Whish JP
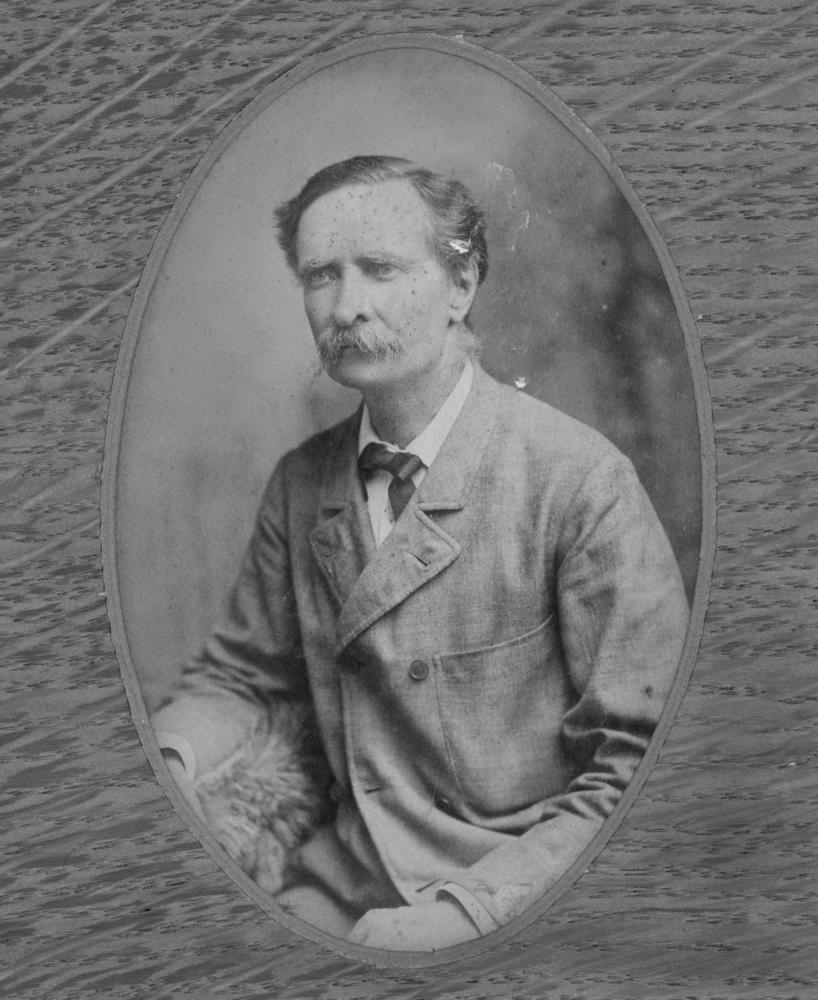

Member of the Queensland Legislative Council
- In office 23 June 1870 – 22 April 1872

Personal details
- Born: Claudius Buchanan Whish; 5 January 1827 Meerut, India
- Died: 28 February 1890 (aged 63) Torres Strait, Queensland, Australia
- Resting place: Lost at sea after sinking of the RMS Quetta
- Spouse: Anne Dow Ker (m.1858 died with her husband in 1890)
- Relations: Reginald Roe (son-in-law)
- Occupation: Sugarcane farmer, Surveyor, Public servant

Claudius Buchanan Whish (5 January 1827 – 28 February 1890) was a prominent sugar-planter, civil servant and politician in Queensland, Australia. He was a Member of the Queensland Legislative Council.

== Early life ==
Whish was born in London, the son of General Sir William Whish, Royal Artillery, and his wife Mary, née Hardwicke.

== Military service ==
In 1851, Whish served in India under the 14th Light Dragoons as an interpreter and bazaar master, officer of public works and assistant quartermaster general of cavalry on General Jacob's staff during the Persian campaign of 1856.

Following a promotion to captain in 1857, Whish traveled to the Australian colonies of New South Wales and South Australia to buy cavalry remounts for the Indian army. He married Anne Whish, née Ker, in Bombay about 1858.

== Sugar cane plantation owner ==
Whish migrated to Queensland on the Young Australia and began the Oaklands sugar plantation in Caboolture on 15 August 1862. His crop did well and he became chairman of the local planters' association and hired Pacific islanders to work on the crop. Although this move lost him the favour of the people, after 1865 it helped to preserve his £5000 investment.

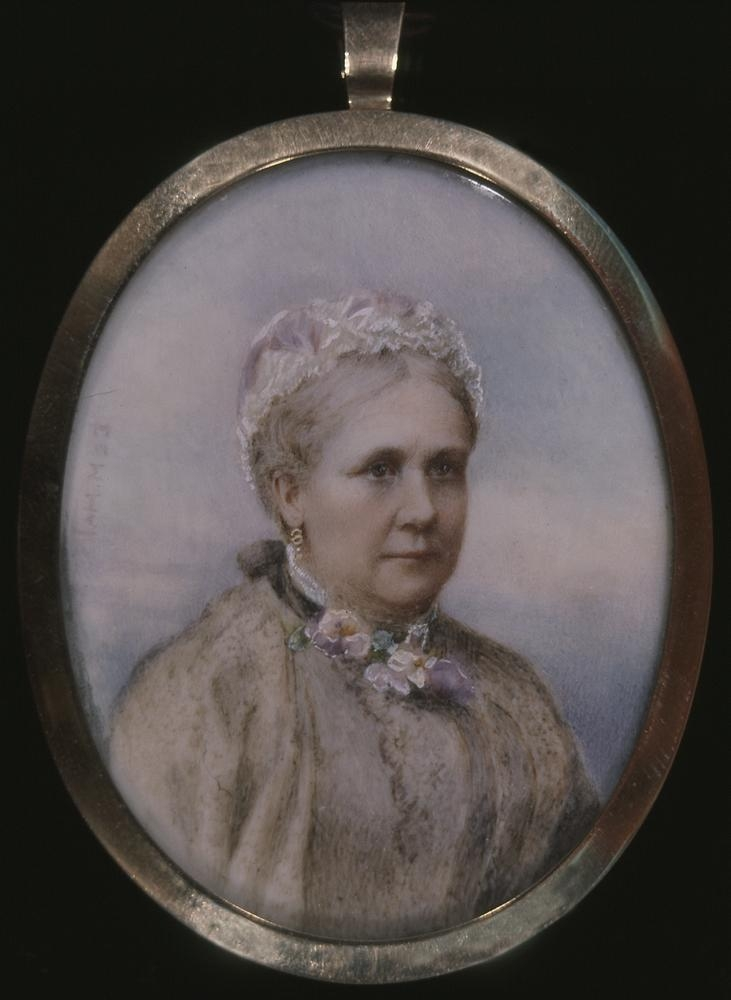
Portrait of his wife Anne Whish

== Politics ==
Whish tried and failed to win the seat of East Moreton in the Queensland Legislative Assembly elections in 1867, and a committee on Pacific island labour was informed that whippings had taken place on Whish's estate. This evidence gained little credence, and as a justice for peace and a deeply religious man, Whish was appointed to the Queensland Legislative Council in June 1870. Although he is known as the first successful sugar-producer in Queensland, Whish's estate lost its worth and he resigned from the Legislative Council in March 1872, sold his machinery and became a surveyor of roads.

== Later life ==
By September 1873, Whish was bankrupt with a debt of £5598, although he was promoted to inspector of road surveys for the southern division in 1875 and for the colony in 1880. He supervised the first road which was made from the Albert River to the Nerang district.

"By 1878, on a permanent public service salary, Whish could at last provide the secure, comfortable home he and Annie wanted for their children: Maud, Evelyn ('Eva'), Ethel, Edith, Arthur and Irwin. A large, single-storey wooden building, with a shingle roof and wide verandahs, it sat on the north-eastern slope of Eildon Hill in what is now the suburb of Windsor. Whish named it Arwin Tel, a combination of the names of the two youngest children and the Arabic word for a hill."

In 1889 Whish took his leave by setting out for England. He was aboard the fated RMS Quetta on the day it sank in the Torres Strait. His wife Anne perished with him; they were survived by their four daughters and two sons.

His daughter Anne Maud Whish married Reginald Heber Roe, who is known for being a headmaster of Brisbane Grammar School and a vice chancellor of the University of Queensland.

== Memorial ==
The Captain Whish Bridge over the Caboolture River on the Bruce Highway and nearby Whish Avenue are named for him.

Whish Street and Arwin Terrace, Windsor, Brisbane are adjacent to where Arwin Tel was situated on ten acres at the top of Thorne Street.

A tablet inside St Andrew's Anglican Church, Lutwyche is a memorial for Captain Claude Whish (lay reader) and Mrs Whish who were early benefactors.

As a memorial to the lives lost on the Quetta, the Quetta Memorial Precinct was established on Thursday Island, comprising a church (later a cathedral), a rectory and a church hall.

Queensland State Library holds a collection of diaries of Claudius Buchanan Whish dated from 1855 to 1889. The 1862 diary contains an account of the preparation for the Whishes' voyage to Australia – particularly the fitting up of their cabins. It also has an account of being falsely imprisoned and a visit to Captain Louis Hope at his Cleveland estate (now Ormiston House). This particular diary, representing Claudius Buchanan Whish Correspondence with Louis Hope (1862 – 1865), was ranked #33 in the 'Top 150: Documenting Queensland' exhibition when it toured to venues around Queensland from February 2009 to April 2010. The exhibition was part of Queensland State Archives' events and exhibition program which contributed to the state's Q150 celebrations, marking the 150th anniversary of the separation of Queensland from New South Wales.

== See also ==
- Members of the Queensland Legislative Council, 1870–1879
