= George Fullerton =

George Fullerton may refer to:

- George Fullerton (cricketer) (1922–2002), South African cricketer
- George Fullerton (politician) (1802–1883), member of the Queensland Legislative Council
- George Stuart Fullerton (1859–1925), American philosopher and psychologist
- George William Fullerton (1923–2009), electric guitar innovator
