= Frederick Isaac =

Australian politician

Member of the Queensland Legislative Council
- In office 25 August 1864 – 12 July 1865

Personal details
- Born: Frederick Neville Isaac; 1825 Worcester, England
- Died: 1865 (aged 39–40) Brisbane, Queensland, Australia
- Spouse: Caroline Sophia Sparkes (m.1854)
- Occupation: Pastoralist, explorer, magistrate

Frederick Neville Isaac (1825 – 12 July 1865) was a Queensland pioneer pastoralist and a Member of the Queensland Legislative Council.

== Queensland pioneer ==
Frederick Isaac arrived in Queensland in 1840. Together with his brother, he accompanied the explorer Ludwig Leichhardt on his first expedition, on which Isaac proved himself an excellent bushman.

After that expedition, Frederick Isaac then returned to Gowrie, and went from there with stock to take up land. In 1847, Isaac and his men settled at a place called Dullacca (later the property of William Miles, Member of the Queensland Legislative Assembly), but he was very soon driven from that land by the aborigines. He managed to save some of his stock but was forced to leave behind all his stores and his dray.

In 1852 he entered a partnership with his brother as owners of Gowrie Station.

In 1854, he returned to England, where he married Caroline Sparkes, of St Johns, Bridgenorth, in Shropshire.

On returning to Queensland, he undertook roles such as territorial magistrate and returning officer for elections.

== Politics ==
Isaac was appointed to the Queensland Legislative Council on 25 August 1864 and served until his death on 12 July 1865.

== Later life ==
Frederick Isaac died on 12 July 1865. He was buried in the Paddington Cemetery. His widow remarried in 1866, to John Watts MLA, Queensland Secretary for Public Works, and returned with him to England in 1867.

== Legacy ==
Leichhardt named the Isaac River after him. In turn, the river gives its name to the local government area of Isaac Region.

Letters from Leichhardt to Isaac are held in the State Library of New South Wales.
