= William Duckett White =

Australian politician

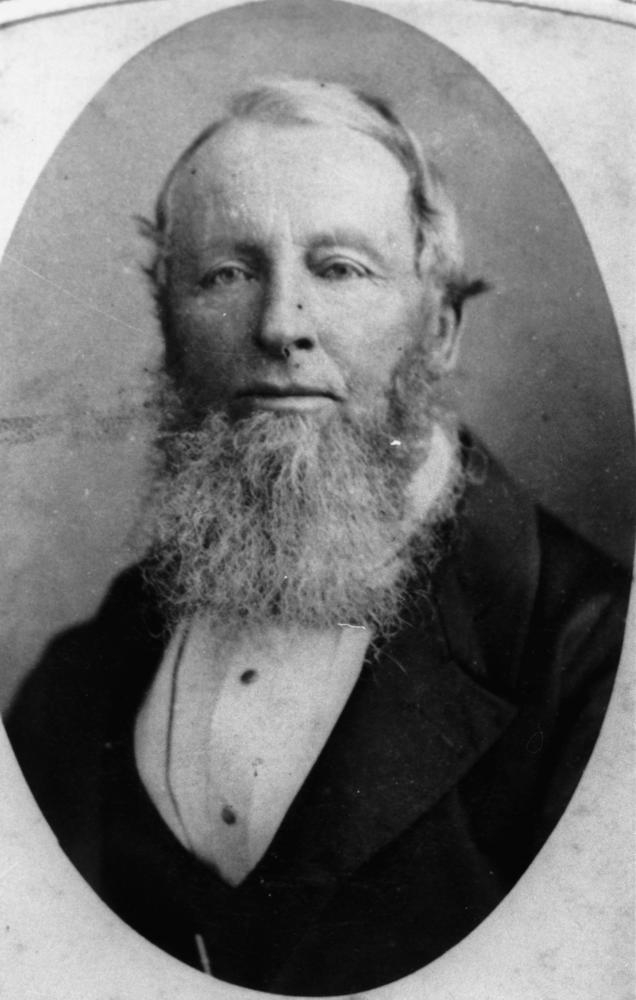

Member of the Queensland Legislative Council

Personal details
- Born: William White; 5 October 1807 Moate, County Westmeath, Ireland
- Died: 11 August 1893 (aged 85) Manly, Queensland, Australia
- Resting place: Tingalpa Cemetery
- Spouse: Jane Simpson (m.1834 d.1887)
- Occupation: Grazier

William Duckett White (1807–1893) was a squatter and politician in Queensland, Australia. He was a Member of the Queensland Legislative Council.

== Early life ==
William White was born into a large Quaker family on 5 October 1807 in Moate, County Westmeath, Ireland and was educated at the Quaker school in Mountmellick in County Laois. In 1835 William married Jane Simpson from Cork.

== Pastoral career ==
William and Jane White and their two children emigrated from Ireland to Sydney as assisted immigrants in 1840. When he arrived in Australia, William assumed his grandmother's maiden name as a second Christian name, and became known thereafter as William Duckett White. From 1842 to 1844 White taught school in the Mangrove area north of Sydney until accepting an offer in 1845 to manage the Beau Desert pastoral run in the Moreton Bay District for his cousin Joseph Phelps Robinson. When Robinson died in 1848, his brother George Robinson and W.D. White took over the lease of Beau Desert, one of the largest runs on the Logan River. In 1857, White left Beau Desert under the management of his son Ernest White and William, and with his wife Jane and their daughter Helena moved to Eagle Farm near Brisbane.

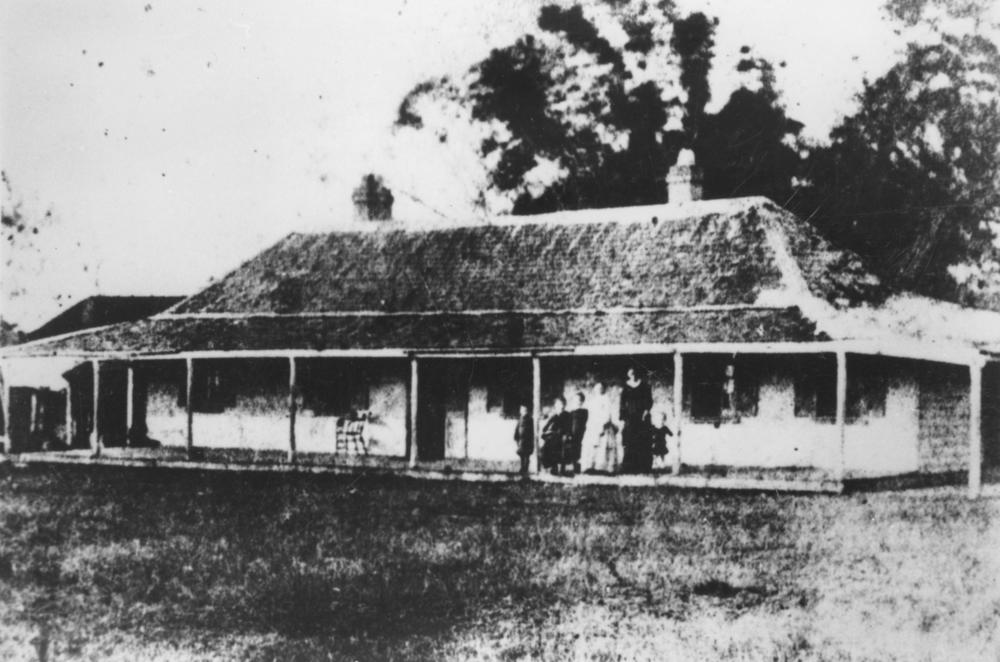
Homestead on Beaudesert Station, circa 1871

The Robinson-White partnership acquired the leases of many cattle runs in Queensland. In addition to the Beau Desert lease they took up three runs in the Gold Coast hinterland in the early 1850s: Tubber in 1852 and Murry Jerry and Dungogie runs in 1853. In 1867 they took up the lease of Pimpama and Cumboomba (or Coombabah) runs in the Beenleigh area but these were thrown open for selection in 1869, and the lease forfeited. In 1871 White and partner William Barker leased the runs of Kerry, Sarabah, and Nindooinbah adjacent to Beau Desert. Much of Beau Desert was cut up for closer settlement in the 1860s and early 1870s following which WD White and his sons acquired the Bluff Downs leases in the Kennedy District. From 1882 the W.D. Whites & Sons formed a partnership with William Collins, Sir Malcolm McEachern, and Sir Simon Fraser. This partnership, called White Collins & Co., leased Beaudesert North, Eulolo, and Glen Ormiston and survived for about a century. The White partnership also owned land in Tingalpa (Lota) and town properties in Beenleigh and Southport.

== Lota House ==
Lota House was erected on the Tingalpa land in 1865–66 and on completion it was transferred to W.D.White's wife Jane. Jane owned Lota House until her death in 1887 and bequeathed it to their son Albert with a proviso that it remain William's home for his lifetime. William died at Lota House in 1893 and is buried alongside Jane in the Tingalpa churchyard.

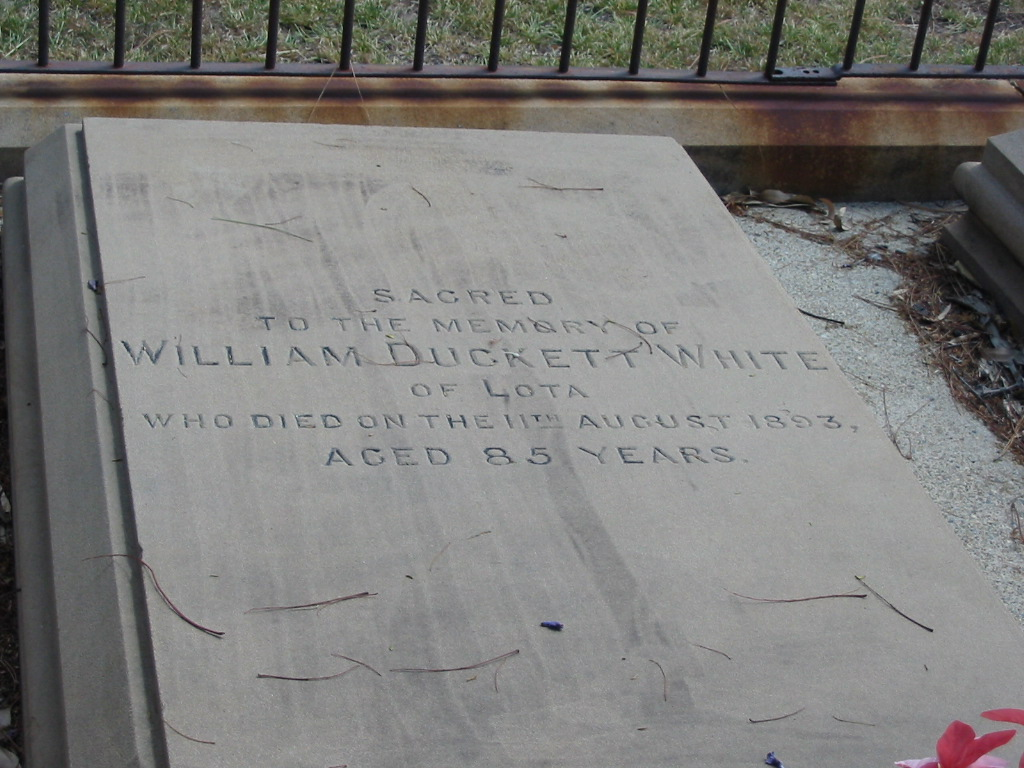
Gravestone for William Duckett White, Tingalpa cemetery, 2005

== Politics ==
White was appointed to the Queensland Legislative Council on 26 April 1861. Although a lifetime appointment, he resigned from the Council on 5 August 1880.

== Later life ==
WD White was active in the local community, being one of the first members of the Bulimba Divisional Board established in 1879–80, a warden of the Tingalpa Anglican Church (now Christ Church, Tingalpa).

White died 11 August 1893 at Lota House. He was buried in Tingalpa Cemetery (Christ Church, Tingalpa) on Saturday 12 August 1893.

== See also ==
- Members of the Queensland Legislative Council, 1860–1869; 1870-1879; 1880-1889
