= William Barker (Queensland politician) =

Australian politician

The Hon William Barker

Member of the Queensland Legislative Council
- In office 26 April 1861 – 22 July 1863

Personal details
- Born: William Barker; 1819 Dumfries, Scotland
- Died: 1886 (aged 66–67) Brisbane, Queensland, Australia
- Resting place: Toowong Cemetery
- Spouse: Elizabeth Harper (m.1847 d.1900)
- Occupation: Station owner

William Barker (1819 – 22 December 1886) was a Station owner and Member of the Queensland Legislative Council.

He was born in Dumfries, Scotland in 1819 to John Barker and his wife Anna Maria (née Smith). He arrived in Queensland and became a Station owner, acquiring several properties around the south-east of the state. Barker was appointed to the Queensland Legislative Council on 26 April 1861 and resigned his seat on the 22 July 1863.

On 8 July 1847 in Logan he married Elizabeth Harper (d.1900) and together had 10 children. Barker died in 1886 and was buried in Toowong Cemetery.
