= Henry Bates Fitz =

Australian politician

Henry Fitz
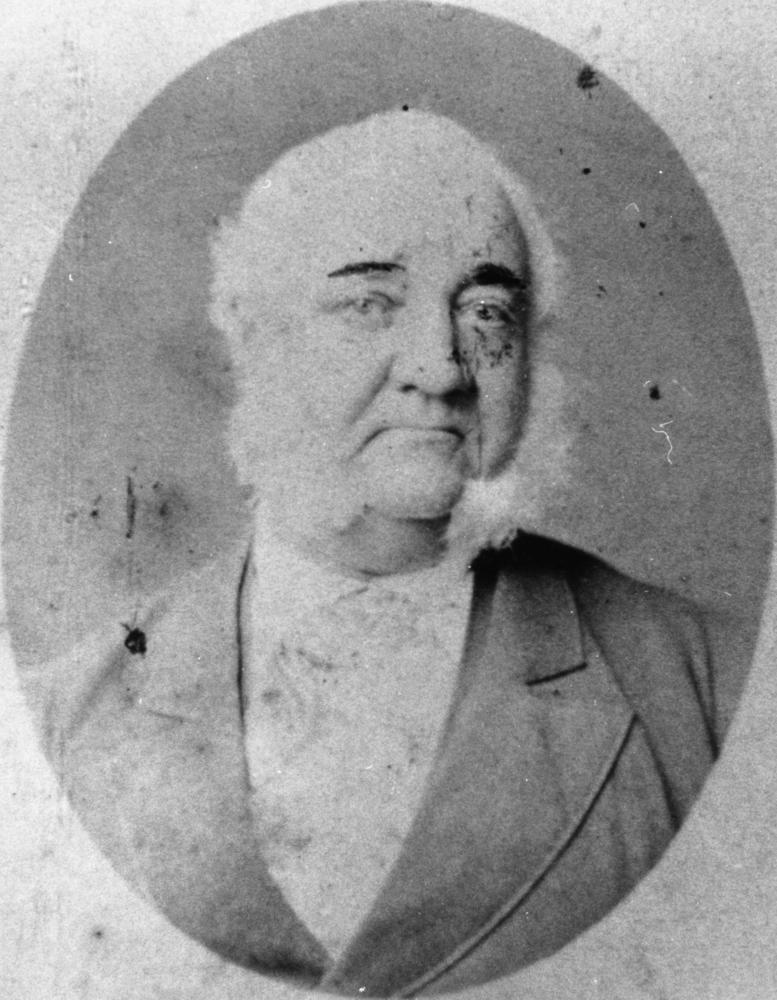

Member of the Queensland Legislative Council
- In office 23 May 1860 – 13 July 1876

Personal details
- Born: Henry Bates Fitz; 10 October 1817 Windsor, New South Wales, Australia
- Died: 29 December 1880 (aged 63) Brisbane, Queensland, Australia
- Resting place: Toowong Cemetery
- Spouse: Elizabeth Hurst (née Abbott) (m.1853 d.1904)
- Occupation: Station manager and owner, Soldier

Henry Bates Fitz (10 October 1817 – 29 December 1880) was a Member of the Queensland Legislative Council.

== Early life ==
Fitz was born in Windsor to Robert Fitz and his wife Ann (née Cannon). For 20 years from 1843 he was the manager of Pikedale Station on the Darling Downs. In 1859 he purchased Pike's Creek Station.

== Politics ==
Fitz was appointed to the Queensland Legislative Council on 23 May 1860 and served for sixteen years until his resignation on 13 July 1876. He was a spokesman for the ultra squatting faction and detested fellow squatters who were prepared to make concessions.

== Personal life ==
Fitz married Elizabeth Hurst (née Abbott) in 1853 and together had 2 children. He was known to his employees as "Murdering Fitz" due to allegations he had murdered a Chinese shepherd during a labour strike. Fitz died in 1880 and was buried in the Toowong Cemetery.
