= William Houston Long =

William Long

Member of the Queensland Legislative Council
- In office 10 March 1873 – 1 March 1878

Personal details
- Born: William Houston Long; 8 November 1843 Settrington, Yorkshire, England
- Died: 29 August 1912 (aged 68) Hove, Sussex, England
- Spouse: Constance Ida Currie (m.1907)
- Occupation: Farmer

William Houston Long (8 November 1843 – 29 August 1912) was a member of the Queensland Legislative Council.

Long was born in Settrington, Yorkshire, England in 1843 to Charles Long and his wife Anna Maria (née Wigram).

Long was appointed to the Queensland Legislative Council in 1873 and served for five years before resigning in 1878. He eventually travelled back to England and died in Hove, Sussex in 1912.
