= George Harris (Queensland politician) =

Australian politician

The Hon George Harris
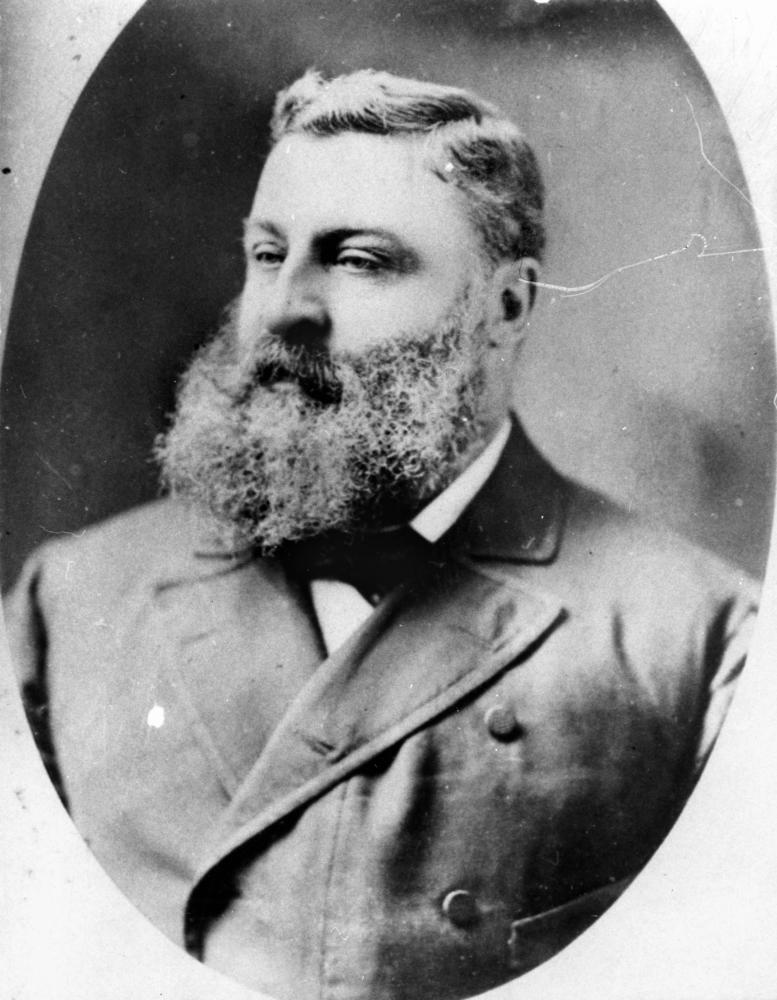
- George Harris, circa 1870

Member of the Queensland Legislative Council
- In office 23 May 1860 – 31 August 1876

Personal details
- Born: George Harris; 1831 London, England
- Died: 1891 (aged 59–60) Brisbane, Australia
- Resting place: Toowong Cemetery
- Spouse: Jane Thorn (m.1860 d.1917)
- Relations: George Thorn (father-in-law), Charles Hill (son-in-law), Richard Casey, (son-in-law), Lord Casey, (grandson)
- Occupation: Gold miner, Importer, Exporter

George Harris (1831–1891) was a politician in Queensland, Australia. He was a Member of the Queensland Legislative Council.

== Early life ==
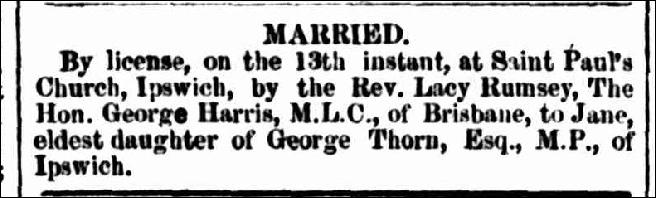
Marriage notice for George Harris and Jane Thorn, Moreton Bay Courier, Tuesday 16 October 1860, page 2

George Harris was born in 1831 in London, England, the son of John Harris and his wife Sarah (née Walton). His family immigrated to Australia when he was two years old.

George Harris and his brother John Harris arrived in Brisbane in about 1848. They opened a store in South Brisbane and a warehouse and wharf at Short Street (at the southern end of Alice Street, where Gardens Point Road is today). They traded under the name Messrs. J. and G. Harris, merchants. The partnership was dissolved some years later, after which George Harris then embarked in business as a merchant on his own account under the name Messrs. George Harris and Co, a business he continued to operate until his death.

On 13 October 1860, he married Jane Thorn, the daughter of George Thorn (senior) of the Normanby pastoral station and a Member of the Queensland Legislative Assembly, at St Paul's Church in Ipswich, Queensland. Jane's brother George Thorn would later also enter the Queensland Legislative Assembly and become Queensland Premier. The couple had the following children:

- Kate May (1862–1862)
- George Edmund (1863–1913)
- John Ernest (1864–1911)
- Edith Maud (1865–1925)
- Jane Eveline (born 1867)

Daughter Edith Maud married George Condamine Taylor of Bellevue Homestead, Esk in 1883. After his death, she married again in 1901 to Charles Lumley Hill, a Member of the Queensland Legislative Assembly for the electoral districts of Gregory and Cook.

Daughter Jane Eveline married Richard Gardiner Casey of Normanby station, a Member of the Queensland Legislative Assembly for Warrego. They were the parents of Australian Governor-General Richard Casey, Baron Casey.

== Politics ==
On 23 May 1860, Harris was appointed to the Queensland Legislative Council. Although a lifetime appointment, he resigned on 31 August 1876.

In 1863, Harris was one of the founders and original trustees of the Queensland Turf Club, having arranged a land grant of 322 acres of land at Eagle Farm in Brisbane for the purpose of horse racing, now known as the Eagle Farm Racecourse. The other trustees were John Frederick McDougall and Maurice Charles O'Connell (all three were Members of the Queensland Legislative Council).

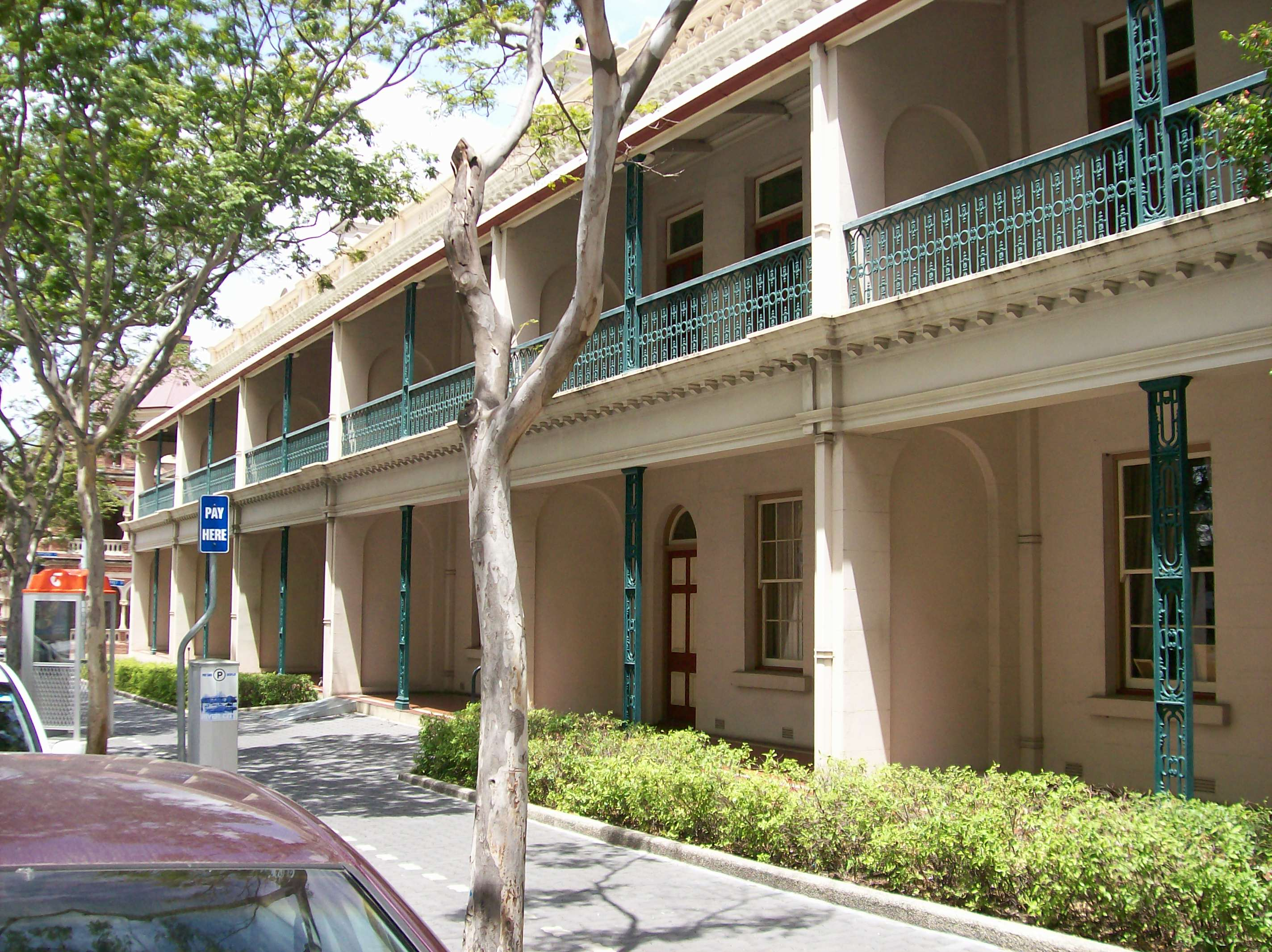
Harris Terrace, 2007

In the mid-1860s, George Harris engaged architect James Cowlishaw to construct a two-storey masonry building (known as Harris Terrace) in George Street, consisting of six terrace houses. Harris Terrace is now listed on the Queensland Heritage Register.

== Later life ==
On Sunday 10 January 1886, George Harris saw a snake near his house and put his foot on it. The snake coiled up his leg, putting Harris in danger. A visitor, T.W. Brown, grabbed a sword and slashed at the snake, but missed and cut Harris's foot, nearly severed one of his toes.

Harris died on Saturday 28 March 1891 at his residence Bankside, North Quay, Brisbane from a sudden laryngitis (swelling of the throat); he died in the arms of his son Ernest Harris. He was buried on Monday 30 March 1891 in Toowong Cemetery.

== Miscellaneous ==
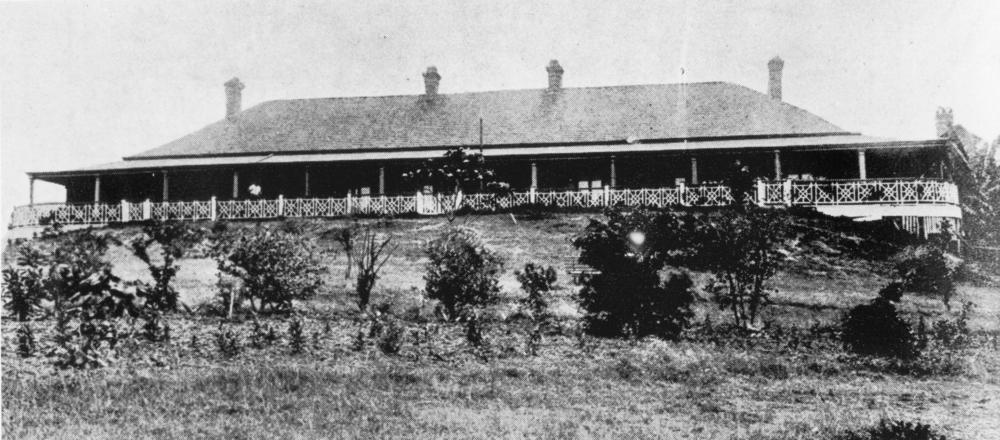
Newstead House, circa 1920

George and Jane Harris occupied the now heritage-listed Newstead House for 27 years, as tenants, then owners and then tenants again, where they entertained the members of Brisbane high society. Their parties were highlights of the social calendar.

The suburb of Harristown, Toowoomba is said to be named after George Harris.

The town of Harrisville is said to be named after George Harris and his brother John Harris.

== See also ==
- Members of the Queensland Legislative Council by year
- Category:Members of the Queensland Legislative Council by name
