= Henry Scott Harden =

Australian politician

Henry Harden

Member of the Queensland Legislative Council
- In office 10 June 1868 – 1 June 1870

Personal details
- Born: Henry Scott Harden; 11 December 1834 Ghent, Belgium
- Died: 10 March 1879 (aged 44) Brisbane, Queensland, Australia
- Resting place: Toowong Cemetery
- Spouse: Dorothea Colburn Mayne
- Relations: Theodore Harden (brother)
- Occupation: Pastoralist

Henry Scott Harden (11 December 1834 – 10 March 1879) was a Member of the Queensland Legislative Council.

== Early years ==
Harden was born in Ghent, Belgium in 1834 to Nathaniel Harden and his wife Margaret (née Miller). He arrived in New South Wales in 1852 and began doing pastoral work on Walker's Station in Twofold Bay. He purchased Northampton Downs which was based on the Barcoo River but he had to endure many hardships and decided to sell the property and return to England.

== Politics ==
Harden returned to Brisbane and on the 10 June 1868 was appointed to the Queensland Legislative Council. He served for two years until he resigned on the 1 June 1870.

== Later life ==
He returned to pastoral work and purchased Langton Downs, around the Peak Downs area and sold it in 1871. Harden then acquired Glenlyon Station on the Darling Downs and owned it till his death.

== Personal life ==
Harden married Dorothea Colburn Mayne in London and together they had 8 children. His brother, Theodore Harden, was the member for Mitchell in 1866. Harden died in Brisbane of consumption in 1879 and was buried in Toowong Cemetery.
