= George Fullerton (politician) =

Australian politician

Dr. George Fullerton
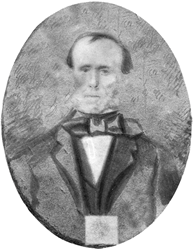

Member of the Queensland Legislative Council
- In office 1 May 1860 – 22 May 1864

Personal details
- Born: George Fullerton; 1802 County Londonderry, Ireland, United Kingdom of Great Britain and Ireland
- Died: 1883 (aged 80–81) Sydney, Australia
- Resting place: Rookwood Cemetery
- Spouse: Julia Moffat (m.1854)
- Occupation: Medical practitioner

Dr. George Fullerton (1802 – 24 September 1883) was a Member of the Queensland Legislative Council.

== Early life ==
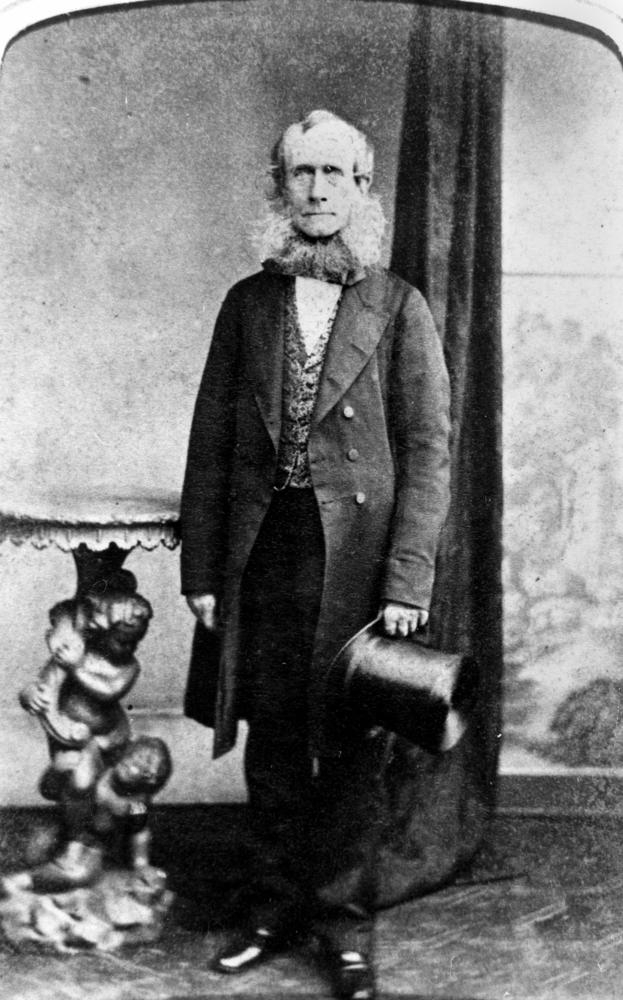
Dr George Fullerton

Fullerton was born in County Londonderry, Ireland, to Archibald Fullerton and his wife Elizabeth (née Church). He arrived in Australia in 1841 was appointed Medical registrar of New South Wales in 1842. He then moved to Queensland in 1857 where he was a medical practitioner.

== Politics ==
Fullerton was appointed to the Queensland Legislative Council on 1 May 1860 and served for four years until his resignation on 22 May 1864. He was a spokesman for the squattocracy on important issues such as the use of coolie labour. It was said he had all the strengths and weaknesses of a conservative Victorian gentleman.

== Personal life ==
Fullerton married Julia Moffat in 1854 and together had 2 children. He returned to Sydney in 1878 and died there in 1883. Fullerton was buried in the Rookwood Cemetery.
