= John James Galloway =

Australian politician

John Galloway
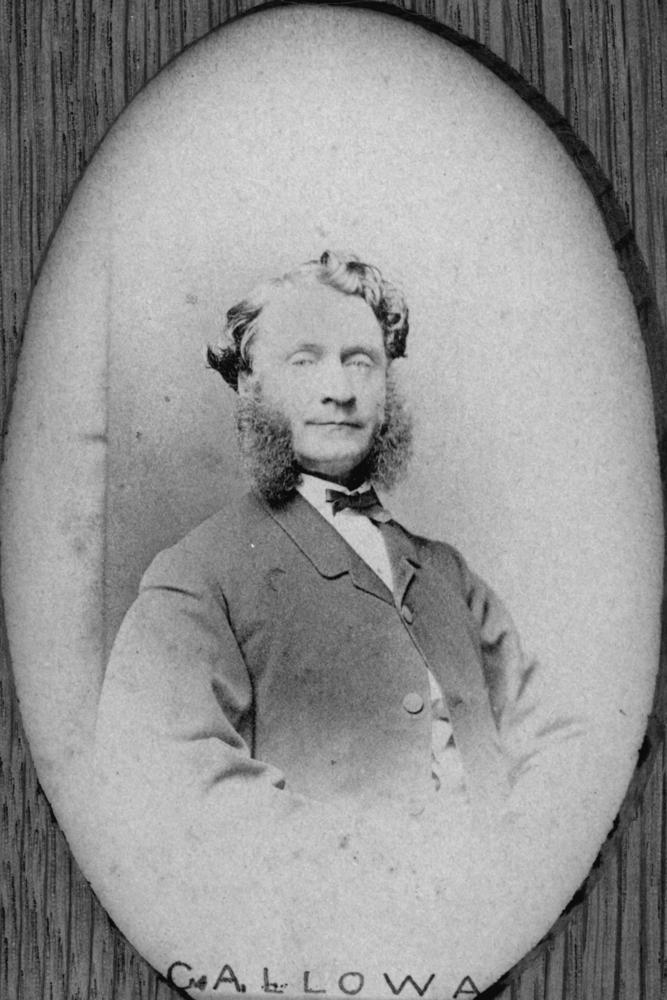
- John James Galloway

Member of the Queensland Legislative Council
- In office 1 May 1860 – 1 May 1865
- In office 13 November 1869 – 17 April 1872

Personal details
- Born: John James Galloway; February 18, 1818 Devon, England
- Died: June 30, 1883 (aged 65) Brussels, Belgium
- Occupation: Surveyor

John James Galloway (18 February 1818 – 30 June 1883) was an early surveyor of Australia and New Zealand and a Member of the Queensland Legislative Council.

== Early life ==
John James Galloway was born on February 18, 1818 in Leith, Scotland. In 1837, at the age of 19, Galloway traveled with his father Thomas Galloway (who was serving as the ship's surgeon) to Australia.

== Career ==
Galloway secured an appointment as an assistant surveyor in Australia. He was then briefly assistant surveyor to New Zealand in 1840. Beginning in 1842 he acted as Commissioner for Crown Lands within the Boundaries. He became a licensed surveyor in 1844, which enabled him to in 1847 secure appointment as a full surveyor.

Galloway served two terms in the Queensland Legislative Council. His first term was from 1 May 1860 until 1 May 1865 and the second was from 13 November 1869 until 17 April 1872. He purchased some urban property, including around the area that now bears his name, Galloway's Hill.

== Later life ==
Galloway returned to England in 1875. He died suddenly in Brussels, Belgium on 30 June 1883 aged 64 years. He was buried in Teignmouth, Devon, England.
