= John Alexander Bell =

Australian politician

The Hon John Bell

Member of the Queensland Legislative Council
- In office 26 September 1866 – 21 November 1872

Personal details
- Born: John Alexander Bell; 1829 County Kildare, Ireland
- Died: 1901 (aged 71–72) Ipswich, Queensland, Australia
- Resting place: Ipswich General Cemetery
- Spouse: Frances Georgina Armstrong (m.1864)
- Relations: Joshua Peter Bell (brother), Joshua Thomas Bell (nephew)
- Occupation: Pastoralist

John Alexander Bell (1829 – 30 August 1901) was a pastoralist and Member of the Queensland Legislative Council.

== Early life ==
Bell was born in County Kildare, Ireland in 1829 to Thomas Bell and his wife Sarah (née Alexander). He arrived in Queensland with his family when he was still a baby and attended The King's School, Parramatta. In 1844, along with his father and brother Joshua Bell became owners of Jimbour Station and Cumkillenbar stations on the Darling Downs.

In 1847, he had married Frances Georgina Armstrong and together had three children.

== Public life ==
Bell was appointed to the Queensland Legislative Council on 26 September 1866 and resigned his seat on the 21 November 1872.

== Later life ==
Bell died in 1901 and was buried in Ipswich General Cemetery.
