= Inch, County Cork =

Village in County Cork, Ireland

Inch
- Location in Ireland
- Coordinates: 51°59′10″N 7°58′38″W
- Country: Ireland
- Province: Munster
- County: County Cork

Inch is a small village in County Cork, Ireland approximately 7 kilometres (4.3 mi) north of the village of Killeagh.

The Roman Catholic church in Inch serves Killeagh and Inch Parish and is dedicated to Saint Patrick. It was built c.1870.
