= John Joseph Mullen =

Australian politician

John Mullen JP

Member of the Queensland Legislative Council
- In office 26 April 1872 – 11 July 1883

Personal details
- Born: John Joseph Mullen; 6 June 1829 Dublin, Ireland
- Died: 17 November 1897 (aged 68) Brisbane, Queensland, Australia
- Resting place: Toowong Cemetery
- Spouse: Anna Victoria Corbett
- Education: King's and Queen's College of Physicians
- Occupation: Surgeon

John Joseph Mullen (6 June 1829 – 17 November 1897) was a member of the Queensland Legislative Council.

Mullen was born in Dublin, Ireland in 1829 to Joseph Denis Mullen and his wife Mary Alice (née MacDonnell). He studied at King's and Queen's College of Physicians, Dublin and graduated as a surgeon.

Mullen was appointed to the Queensland Legislative Council in 1872 and served for eleven years before having his seat declared vacant in 1883. Mullen died in Brisbane in 1897 and was buried in Toowong Cemetery.
