= Eyles Browne =

Australian politician (1819–1886)

Member of the Queensland Legislative Council
- In office 3 July 1863 – 14 August 1882

Personal details
- Born: Eyles Irwin Caulfield Browne; 24 June 1819 Stroud, Gloucestershire, England
- Died: 17 June 1886 (aged 66) Brisbane, Queensland, Australia
- Resting place: Toowong Cemetery
- Spouse: Mary Ann Rebecca Morris (m.1853)
- Occupation: Solicitor, Newspaper owner

Eyles Irwin Caulfield Browne (24 June 1819 – 17 June 1886) was a solicitor and Member of the Queensland Legislative Council.

== Early life ==
Browne was born in Stroud, Gloucestershire, England in 1819 to Eyles Brown and his wife Mary (née Irwin). His father was a distinguished army surgeon. He became a solicitor and practised in Bath, Gloucester, and Kidderminster before emigrating to Sydney to practise in 1857. By 1860 he had travelled to Brisbane and became a partner in a legal firm with Robert Little. Browne formed the Brisbane Newspaper Company in 1873 and purchased both the Brisbane Courier and The Queenslander.

== Politics ==
Browne was appointed to the Queensland Legislative Council on 3 July 1863 and served for nineteen years until his resignation due to ill health on 14 August 1882. For the last few years he was unable to attend the Council due to a severe illness which made walking difficult.

Until his illness he had served on many committees, and several times was the chairman. He often had to explain legislation coming from the Assembly, especially bills on legal subjects.

== Personal life ==
Browne married Mary Ann Rebecca Morris in 1853 and together had one daughter. He slowly withdrew from public life and died in 1886. Browne is buried in the Toowong Cemetery.
