= J & G Cowlishaw =

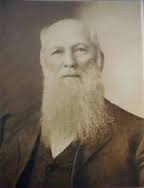
James Cowlishaw, 1920

J & G Cowlishaw (1876—c. 1890) was an architectural partnership in Brisbane, Queensland, Australia.

== History ==
The partnership J & G Cowlishaw consisted of two architects and brothers James Cowlishaw and George Cowlishaw, sons of Sydney architect and contractor Thomas Cowlishaw. George Cowlishaw worked for his brother James from c. 1862 and was taken into partnership in 1876. James's other business interests reduced his involvement in architecture over time and appears to have terminated c. 1890, although George continued the practice into the early 1890s.
