= Charles Melbourne =

Australian politician

Member of the Queensland Legislative Council
- In office 18 April 1878 – 18 August 1885

Personal details
- Born: Charles Sydney Dick Melbourne; 3 June 1838 Sydney, New South Wales, Australia
- Died: 23 September 1891 (aged 53) Rockhampton, Queensland, Australia
- Resting place: Rockhampton General Cemetery
- Spouse: Sarah Jane Daly (m.1865)
- Occupation: Articled clerk

Charles Sydney Dick Melbourne (3 June 1838 – 23 September 1891) was a member of the Queensland Legislative Council.

Melbourne was born in Sydney, New South Wales, Australia in 1838 to Alexander Dick Melbourne and his wife Charlotte (née Hutchinson).

He was appointed to the Queensland Legislative Council in 1878 and served for seven years before resigning in 1885. Melbourne died in Rockhampton in 1891 and was buried in Rockhampton General Cemetery.
