= Alfred Henry Brown =

Australian politician

The Hon Alfred Brown

Member of the Queensland Legislative Council
- In office 26 April 1861 – 13 May 1863
- In office 12 January 1874 – 26 January 1882

Personal details
- Born: Alfred Henry Brown; 1818 Somersetshire near Bristol, England
- Died: 1907 aged 89 Tunbridge Wells, Kent, England
- Occupation: Station owner, Sugar mill owner

Alfred Henry Brown (1818 – 20 February 1907) was an Australian station owner and Member of the Queensland Legislative Council.

== Early life ==
Brown was born in Brislington, Somersetshire, England bef Sept 1818 to John Brown and his wife Mary (née Cater).

== Pastoralist ==
He and three brothers, Dr. Walter Brown, Henry Hort Brown and Arthur Brown, migrated to Queensland around 1839 under medical advice due to pulmonary disease. Together they invested all of their capital in purchasing Gin Gin station, Junction station in Wide Bay district, taking up yet another station in Port Curtis. Brown managed the station and gained a reputation with his nearby pastoralists and became known as the "British Lion of the Burnett". Altogether the brothers ending up as leaseholders of hundreds of square miles of the best cattle country on the north coast of Australia, including Barolin Station, Fairymeade Station and Kolan Station, as well as the sugar plantation at Antigua.

== Politics and public life ==
The Governor General of New South Wales appointed Alfred Henry Brown of Port Curtis to be a magistrate for New South Wales on 30 August 1858.

On Thursday 15 July 1858 Alfred Brown, Esq. appeared in Sydney before the Select Committee on the Murders by the Aborigines on the Dawson River. This Committee was appointed as a reaction to the Hornet Bank massacre and subsequent events.

Brown was appointed to the Queensland Legislative Council on 26 April 1861 and resigned his seat on the 13 May 1863. He was once again appointed on 12 January 1874 and served till he resigned on 26 January 1882.

On 26 June 1861 the Honorable Alfred Henry Brown, M.L.C., appeared before the Select Committee on the Native Police Force in Queensland. He made it clear that he did not support the native police, and in particular the officers of the native olice.

In 1879 he was appointed on the founding trustees of Maryborough Boys Grammar School.

== Later life ==
Brown retired to Sydney and later on, returned to England. Brown died at Tunbridge Wells in 1907.
