= Joseph Capel Smyth =

Joseph Smyth

Member of the Queensland Legislative Council
- In office 5 May 1882 – 16 July 1910

Personal details
- Born: Joseph Capel Smyth; February 1830 Inch, County Cork, Ireland
- Died: 14 August 1914 (aged 84) Brisbane, Queensland, Australia
- Resting place: Toowong Cemetery
- Occupation: Pastoralist, Company director

Joseph Capel Smyth (February 1838 – 14 August 1914) was a member of the Queensland Legislative Council.

Smyth was born in 1830 in Inch, County Cork, Ireland to Jonas Smyth and his wife Mary (née Capel) and educated at Riordan's Classical School, Cloyne. When he was around 31 years of age he travelled to Queensland and, in conjunction with Thomas McIlwraith, managed several properties. He later became a Company director of the Darling Downs and Western Land Co and the Queensland Investment and Land Mortgage Co.

Appointed to the Queensland Legislative Council in May 1882, Smyth served for twenty-eight years before resigning in July 1910. Smyth died in 1914 and was buried in Toowong Cemetery.
