= Daniel Foley Roberts =

Australian politician

The Hon Daniel Roberts
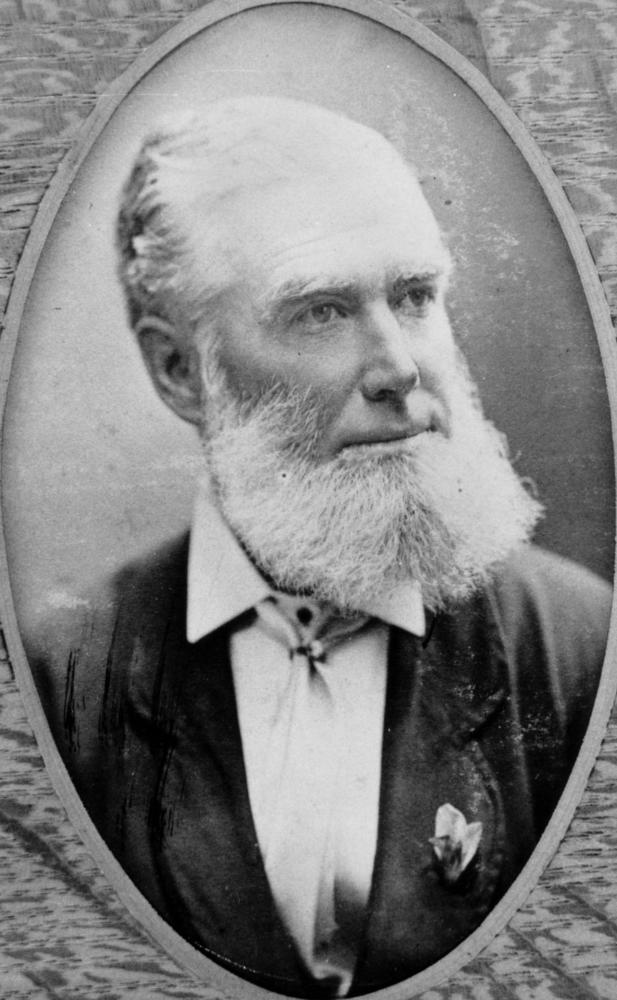

Member of the Queensland Legislative Council
- In office 23 May 1860 – 26 July 1889

Personal details
- Born: Daniel Foley Roberts; 19 February 1824 Sydney, New South Wales, Australia
- Died: 26 July 1889 (aged 65) Brisbane, Queensland, Australia
- Resting place: Toowong Cemetery
- Spouse: Caroline May Cooper (m.1846 d.1886)
- Occupation: Solicitor

Daniel Foley Roberts M.L.C. (19 February 1824 – 26 July 1889) was a member of the Queensland Legislative Council.

Roberts was born in Sydney, New South Wales where he was educated. He was admitted as a solicitor of the Supreme Court of New South Wales in 1849. He arrived in Brisbane in 1851 and began a practice there.

Roberts narrowly lost the Queensland Legislative Assembly election for Fortitude Valley to Charles Lilley in 1860. Roberts was one of the first members nominated to the Legislative Council of Queensland, and was Chairman of Committees of that body from its inception in May 1860 till his death on 26 July 1889.

Roberts was buried in Toowong Cemetery.
