= William Forrest (Australian politician) =

Australian politician

The Hon William Forrest

Member of the Queensland Legislative Council
- In office 15 March 1883 – 23 April 1903

Personal details
- Born: William Forrest; 11 January 1835 Derry, Ireland
- Died: 23 April 1903 (aged 68) Brisbane, Queensland, Australia
- Resting place: Toowong Cemetery
- Occupation: Company director

William Forrest (11 January 1835 – 23 April 1903) was an Australian pastoralist, company director and politician, a member of the Queensland Legislative Council.

Forrest was born in Ballykelly, County Londonderry, Ireland, educated privately and studied at Glasgow. Forrest arrived in Melbourne aboard the Ravenscraig in December 1853 and moved to Queensland in 1860. Forrest was a member of the Queensland firm of B. D. Morehead & Co.

Forrest was appointed a member of the Legislative Council on 15 March 1883, holding this position until his death on 23 April 1903. Forrest was buried in Toowong Cemetery.
