= Henry George Simpson =

Australian politician

Henry Simpson

Member of the Queensland Legislative Council
- In office 29 July 1868 – 29 April 1882

Personal details
- Born: Henry George Simpson; 1822 Bexhill-on-Sea, Sussex, England
- Died: 1898 (aged 75–76) Worthing, Sussex, England
- Spouse: Eliza Lamb (m.1855)
- Occupation: Naval officer, Police magistrate, Business owner

Henry George Simpson (1822 – 30 August 1898) was a Member of the Queensland Legislative Council.

== Early life ==
Simpson was born at Bexhill-on-Sea, Sussex, England in 1822 to the Rev H.W. Simpson and his wife Elizabeth. After completing his schooling at Dartmouth he joined the Royal Navy. In 1840 he set out on HMS Princess Charlotte working as a midshipman and by 1842 was a mate on HMS Harlequin.

From 1846 till 1850, Simpson was promoted to lieutenant and stationed in the East Indies aboard HMS Rattlesnake. By the time he had retired from the navy in 1863, Simpson had been promoted to commander. In 1865, Simpson arrived in Queensland and within a year had been made Commissioner of Crown Lands.

== Politics ==
Simpson was appointed to the Queensland Legislative Council on 29 July 1868 and served for 14 years before resigning on 29 April 1882 . During this time he became a member of the Marine Board of Queensland in 1869, the Central Board of Health in 1874, and was a member of the Royal Commission for Improving the Navigation of Moreton Bay.

== Personal life ==
In 1855, Simpson married Eliza Lamb in South Africa. He returned to England in 1883 and died in Worthing, Sussex in 1898.
