= William Hobbs (politician) =

Australian politician

The Hon Dr William Hobbs
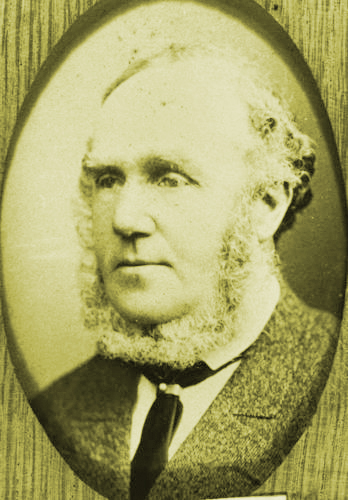

Member of the Queensland Legislative Council
- In office 26 April 1861 – 18 October 1880

Personal details
- Born: William Hobbs; 1822 Middlesex, England
- Died: 1890 (aged 67–68) Brisbane, Queensland, Australia
- Resting place: Toowong Cemetery
- Spouse: Anna Louisa Barton (d.1853 d.1914)
- Relations: Edmund Barton (brother-in-law)
- Occupation: Surgeon

Dr William Hobbs (1822 – 8 December 1890) was a medical doctor and politician in colonial Queensland.

Hobbs was born in London, England, and was one of the earliest colonists of Queensland, practised as a doctor in Brisbane, and was for a considerable period the Government medical officer. Accompanied by his aged mother, he arrived at Moreton Bay on 1 May 1849 as surgeon of the Chaseley, the second of John Dunmore Lang's migrant ships. After a brief period at Drayton on the Darling Downs, he commenced practice in Brisbane in September.

He was nominated to the Queensland Legislative Council and was a member of the first responsible government, without portfolio, under the premiership of Robert Herbert, the permanent Under-Secretary for the Colonies, from April 1861 to January 1862. Mr. Hobbs married Anna Louisa Barton, sister of Edmund Barton, of Sydney. He died in Brisbane on 8 December 1890 and was buried in Toowong Cemetery.

He was also an important witness to the prosecution of the perpetrators involved within the Myall Creek Massacre sending a letter to the high court explaining what he had seen. This led to the hanging of seven of the perpetrators making the Myall Creek Massacre one of the only justified massacres in the Frontier Wars
