= William Thornton (Queensland politician) =

Australian politician in Queensland (1817–1884)

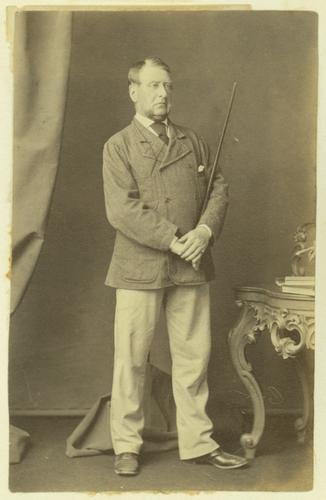

Member of the Queensland Legislative Council
- In office 26 September 1866 – 8 September 1879
- In office 30 October 1882 – 27 June 1884

Personal details
- Born: William Thornton; 2 October 1821 Grenville, County Cavan, Ireland
- Died: 27 June 1884 (aged 62) Brisbane, Queensland, Australia
- Resting place: South Brisbane Cemetery
- Spouse: Ellen Buttenshaw (née Fisher) (m.1842 died 1888)
- Occupation: Farmer, businessman, Collector of Customs

William Thornton (15 June 1817 – 27 June 1884) was a member of the Queensland Legislative Council.

== Early life ==
Thornton was born in Grenville, County Cavan, Ireland in 1817 to Perrott Mee Thornton and his wife Ellen (née Cochrane). After doing his schooling in Dungannon he attended Trinity College, Dublin but left after a short time. Having a boyish passion for the sea, he found work as a Mercantile Marine with the East India Company, which disappointed his father, who had wanted him to become a solicitor.

While working for the company he made a trip to Sydney and back on board a merchantman before the company's charter expired. Thornton returned to Ireland for a short time before once again setting out for Sydney. After working as a public servant for the New South Wales Government, he joined his cousin who was taking stock to South Australia with the journey taking four months. After returning to New South Wales, Thornton became a squatter in the Wellington area.

In 1853 he returned to Ireland only to be back in Australia two years later. Back in Australia, Thornton resumed work as a public servant and was transferred to Moreton Bay as a Collector of Customs for the New South Wales Government. Upon Queensland's separation in 1859, he was Collector of Customs for the Queensland Government and worked in this role till 1882.

== Politics ==
Thornton was appointed to the Queensland Legislative Council on the 26 September 1866. He served for thirteen years before being forced to resign on the 8 September 1879 due to still being a public servant.

Thornton resigned as Collector of Customs in 1882 and was once again appointed to the Council. He served until his death on the 27 June 1884.

== Personal life ==
In 1842, Thornton married Ellen Buttenshaw at Molong, New South Wales. Thornton died at Kangaroo Point in 1884 and was buried in South Brisbane Cemetery.
