= William Draper Box =

Australian politician

The Hon William Box

Member of the Queensland Legislative Council
- In office 2 January 1874 – 26 January 1904

Personal details
- Born: William Draper Box; 1841 Walsall, Staffordshire, England
- Died: 26 January 1904 (aged 62–63) Hobart, Tasmania, Australia
- Resting place: Cornelian Bay Cemetery
- Spouse: Mary Elizabeth
- Occupation: Bank manager, Company manager

William Draper Box (1841–1904) was a politician in Queensland, Australia. He was a Member of the Queensland Legislative Council.

== Early life ==
William Draper Box was born in 1841 Walsall, Staffordshire, England, the son of Henry and Jane Box. He was educated in Melbourne. He came to Brisbane in 1862, aged 21, to establish a branch of his father's business, Henry Box and Son, which were saddlers, coachbuilders, ironmongers and importers.

== Politics ==
William Box was appointed to the Queensland Legislative Council on 2 January 1874. Being a lifetime appointment, he held it until his death on 26 January 1904.

== Later life ==
William Box died on 26 January 1904 in Hobart, Tasmania and was buried in Cornelian Bay Cemetery.

== Legacy ==
His residence Baroona at Paddington is listed on the Queensland Heritage Register.
