= Frederick Holberton =

Australian politician (1821–1907)

The Hon Frederick Holberton
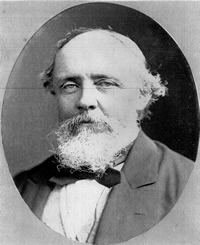

Member of the Queensland Legislative Council
- In office 4 July 1885 – 9 September 1907

Personal details
- Born: Frederick Hurrell Holberton; 28 October 1821 Totnes, Devon, England
- Died: 9 September 1907 (aged 85) Toowoomba, Queensland, Australia
- Resting place: Drayton and Toowoomba Cemetery
- Spouse: Sophie Hope Best (m.1869 d.1916)
- Occupation: Company director

Frederick Hurrell Holberton (28 October 1821 – 9 September 1907) was a member of the Queensland Legislative Council.

Holberton was born in Totnes, Devon, England in 1821 to William Holberton and his wife Elizabeth (née Harris) and was educated in Totnes.

He was appointed to the Queensland Legislative Council in July 1885, serving until his death in July 1907.

In 1869, Holberton married Sophie Hope Best and there are no records of them having had children. He died in 1907 and was buried in Drayton and Toowoomba Cemetery.
