= William Grene Power =

Australian politician

William Power

Member of the Queensland Legislative Council
- In office 19 September 1883 – 14 August 1903

Personal details
- Born: William Grene Power; 24 September 1835 Clonmel, South Tipperary, Ireland
- Died: 14 August 1903 (aged 67) Nundah, Queensland, Australia
- Resting place: Toowong Cemetery
- Spouse: Mary Teresa Perkins (d.1924)
- Education: Carlow College
- Occupation: Company director

William Grene Power (24 September 1835 – 14 August 1903) was a member of the Queensland Legislative Council.

== Biography ==
Power was born in 1835 at Clonmel, South Tipperary, Ireland to Edward Power and his wife Mary Ann (née Grene) and was educated at Carlow College, Ireland. After arriving in Australia he was mayor of Jamieson, Victoria in 1866 and became a managing partner in Perkins & Co and the Queensland Deposit Bank.

He was appointed to the Queensland Legislative Council in September 1883, and served for twenty years until his death in August 1903.

Power was married to Mary Teresa and together they had seven children. He died in 1903 and was buried in Toowong Cemetery.
