= Frederick Hart (politician) =

Member of the Queensland Legislative Council
- In office 11 July 1872 – 15 July 1915

Personal details
- Born: Frederick Hamilton Scott Hart; 26 March 1836 Madras, India
- Died: 15 July 1915 (aged 79) Brisbane, Queensland, Australia
- Resting place: Toowong Cemetery
- Spouse: Harriett Isabel Blanche Horsley (d.1894)
- Occupation: Businessman

Frederick Hamilton Scott Hart (26 March 1836 – 15 July 1915) was a member of the Queensland Legislative Council.

Hart was born in Madras, India in 1836 to William Hamilton Hart and his wife Fanny (Lloyd). His family moved to Australia in 1843 and he was educated at various schools including The King's School, Parramatta before returning to England for four years. In 1853 he travelled back to Australia and worked for his father's mercantile firm, Bright Bros.

Hart was appointed to the Queensland Legislative Council in 1872, and served for over forty three years until his death in 1915.

He married Harriett Isabel Blanche Horsley and together they had seven children. Hart died in Brisbane, Queensland in 1883, and was buried in Toowong Cemetery.
