= William Frederick Lambert =

Australian politician

William Lambert

Member of the Queensland Legislative Council
- In office 15 March 1872 – 3 December 1901

Personal details
- Born: William Frederick Lambert; December 1834 Ballyvolane, County Cork, Ireland
- Died: 1908 (aged 73–74) Rockhampton, Queensland, Australia
- Resting place: Rockhampton General Cemetery
- Occupation: Businessman, Grazier

William Frederick Lambert (December 1834 – 20 August 1908) was a member of the Queensland Legislative Council.

Lambert was born in Ballyvolane, County Cork, Ireland in 1834 to William Lambert and his wife Eliza (née Furlong). He arrived in Australia in 1858 and by 1866 he had founded the Laurel Bank Boiling Down Works in Rockhampton, Queensland.

Lambert was appointed to the Queensland Legislative Council in 1872 and served for over twenty nine years before resigning in 1901. He died in Rockhampton in 1908 and was buried in Rockhampton General Cemetery.
