= Members of the Queensland Legislative Council =

Following are lists of members of the Queensland Legislative Council:

- 1860–1869
- 1870–1879
- 1880–1889
- 1890–1899
- 1900–1909
- 1910–1916
- 1917–1922
