= Legislative Council of Queensland =

Abolished chamber of the Parliament of Queensland

Legislative Council
- Coat of arms of Queensland (pre-1977 version)

Type
- Type: Upper house of the Parliament of Queensland

History
- Established: 1 May 1860
- Disbanded: 23 March 1922; 104 years ago

Leadership
- President: William Lennon (Note: At time of abolition.)

Structure
- Seats: 58 seats
- Political groups: Labor (34); Nonpartisan (23); Ministerialist (1)
- Length of term: For life following appointment by the governor on the advice of the premier

Meeting place
- Legislative Council Chamber; Parliament House, Brisbane, Queensland, Australia

The Legislative Council of Queensland was the upper house of the parliament in the Australian state of Queensland. It was a fully nominated body which first took office on 1 May 1860. It was abolished by the Constitution Amendment Act 1921, which took effect on 23 March 1922.

Consequently, the Legislative Assembly of Queensland is the only unicameral state Parliament in Australia. Two territories, the Northern Territory and Australian Capital Territory, also maintain unicameral parliaments.

Most of the early members of the Council came from wealthy families, were well educated and were born in England. Absenteeism was a problem in the early years, with some members returning to England, being absent for several years.

== Abolition ==
The Legislative Council was seen by the Queensland Labor Party as undemocratic and a tool of patronage, and upon the establishment of a secure Labor majority in the Assembly in 1915, Labor sought the house's abolition. Bills for this purpose were rejected by the Council itself in 1915 and 1916, and a referendum failed on 5 May 1917 on a vote of 179,105 to 116,196. In 1918 on the recommendations of the Labor Government, Sir Hamilton Goold-Adams appointed 13 Labor Members to the Legislative Council and an additional 3 in 1919. Even with these additional members it was not guaranteed that the Council would vote itself out of existence, given the results of the Referendum. So, in 1920, the Government under Premier Ted Theodore changed tack. He firstly asked the Governor of the day, Sir Hamilton Goold-Adams to appoint additional members to the Legislative Council. The Governor declined but, because of ill health, he retired in 1920 and on his recommendation, William Lennon, then Speaker of the Legislative Assembly, was appointed to be the Lieutenant Governor. Shortly after this, on 19 February 1920, Lennon appointed 14 new members to the Legislative Council, all of them members of the Labor Party. By this means, Labor then had sufficient members within the Council to vote for its own dissolution.

The abolition bill was eventually passed by the Assembly on a 51–15 vote on 24 October 1921. The bill was then introduced to the Council by the leader of the Government in the Council, Alfred James Jones, who remarked, "Until we had a majority here, [the Council] was obstructive, and now that we have a majority here it is useless." However, Opposition councillor Patrick Leahy protested that the abolition of the chamber would result in the Assembly being "able to do what it thinks fit" and becoming unaccountable. On 26 October 1921, the Council voted itself out of existence; the members who voted for the abolition were known as the "suicide squad". The Council rose for the last time at 8:37 p.m. the next evening.

The non-Labor parties petitioned the British Government, but the Colonial Secretary, Winston Churchill, concluded that the matter was "essentially one for determination locally", and the Governor felt "unable to say that there is evidence of any strong or widespread feeling in the country against this assent being given." Royal Assent was given on 3 March 1922, and the Act was proclaimed in the Government Gazette 20 days later, abolishing the Council.

Labor's view was summed up in 1980 by Labor politician and historian Dr Denis Murphy, who claimed the "dominance of wealth and property over the Queensland parliament" was broken. However, some scholars and political commentators have argued that the abuses of the Bjelke-Petersen regime (1968–1987) in Queensland were only possible because of the absence of an upper house, and that the problem was not the Council itself but its existence as a nominated rather than elected body (Legislative Councils in all other states were fully elective by 1900, except in New South Wales where some nominative features lasted until the 1970s.)

== Support for reintroduction ==
Since 2012, there has been support from some politicians for the reintroduction of the Legislative Council in the Queensland Parliament. Several independents have at various times supported the reintroduction of an upper house. The Queensland Greens support the reintroduction of an upper house elected by proportional representation.

Federal Greens senator Larissa Waters, independent MPs Peter Wellington and Liz Cunningham, One Nation leader Pauline Hanson and One Nation MP Stephen Andrew have all publicly supported the return of the upper house, believing that both constituents and political parties would benefit with fairer representation.

However, when in office LNP premier Campbell Newman and Labor premier Annastacia Palaszczuk both publicly rejected the calls for the upper house to be reestablished.

On 11 May 2021, a petition was tabled in parliament which was submitted by Kallangur resident Daniel Boniface and sponsored by Member for Mirani Stephen Andrew requesting a referendum be held on the issue of reinstating the Legislative Council. The petition was signed by 940 people. In a letter addressed to the Clerk of Parliament on 11 June 2021, premier Annastacia Palaszczuk responded that the issue was not one she had taken to the people, nor was it an issue her government intended to pursue.

Neither major party currently supports the reintroduction of an upper house.

== List of presidents of the Legislative Council ==
Member	Party	Term in office
Charles Nicholson	Unaligned	22 May 1860 – 26 August 1860
Maurice Charles O'Connell	Unaligned	27 August 1860 – 23 March 1879
Joshua Peter Bell	Unaligned	3 April 1879 – 20 December 1881
Arthur Hunter Palmer	Unaligned	24 December 1881 – 20 March 1898
Hugh Nelson	Ministerialist	13 April 1898 – 1 January 1906
Arthur Morgan	Ministerialist	19 January 1906 – 19 December 1916
William Hamilton	Labor	15 February 1917 – 17 August 1920
William Lennon	Labor	18 August 1920 – 23 March 1922

== See also ==
- Members of the Queensland Legislative Council by year
- Category:Members of the Queensland Legislative Council by name
