= James Smith =

James Smith may refer to:

== In arts and media ==
=== Architects ===
- James Smith (architect, died 1731) (c. 1645–1731), Scottish architect
- James Smith (Glasgow architect) (1808–1863), Scottish architect and father of Madeleine Smith
- James Smith of Jordanhill (1782–1867), Scottish merchant, antiquarian, architect, geologist and biblical critic
- James Kellum Smith (1893–1961), American architect

=== Musicians ===
- James Prince (James Andre Smith, born 1965), American founder of Texas-based Rap-A-Lot Records
- James Smith, American guitarist for the band Underoath
- James Smith, British singer and member of Hadouken!
- James Smith, British singer and member Yard Act
- James Smith (born 1999), finalist in Britain's Got Talent
- James Marcus Smith, singer, better known as P. J. Proby
- James Thomas Smith, British musician and member of The xx, better known as Jamie xx
- LL Cool J (James Todd Smith, born 1968), American rapper

=== Writers ===
- James Smith (journalist) (1820–1910), Australian journalist
- James Smith (writer) (1775–1839), British humorist
- James Cooray Smith (born 1978), British writer, critic and columnist
- James Lindsay Smith (c. 1816–c. 1883), American slave narrative author and minister
- James Robert Smith (author) (born 1957), American author
- James Thorne Smith (1892–1934), American author

=== In other arts ===
- James Smith (actor) (born 1948), English actor
- James Smith (sculptor) (1775–1815), English sculptor
- James Smith (fitness influencer) (born 1989), England-born personal trainer and social media influencer
- James Smith, film editor; see James and Rose Smith
- James Burrell Smith (1822–1897), English watercolour and landscape artist
- James Reuel Smith (1852–1935), American photographer and amateur historian

== Engineers and inventors ==
- James Smith (inventor) (1789–1850), British
- James B. Smith (born 1952), dean of engineering, technology, and aeronautics at Southern New Hampshire University
- James E. Smith (engineer) (born 1950), computer engineer and professor at the University of Wisconsin–Madison
- James John Smith (1892–1983), Irish applied mathematician and electrical engineer
- James Charles Smith, engineer
- James Cowan Smith (1843–1919), British civil engineer and philanthropist
- James John Smith (1892–1983), Irish applied mathematician and electrical engineer
- James Thorneloe Smith (1825–1902), engineer and politician in Queensland, Australia

== Military personnel ==
=== United Kingdom ===
- James Smith (VC) (1871–1946), English recipient of the Victoria Cross
- James Alexander Smith (1881–1968), English recipient of the Victoria Cross
- James Dunlop Smith (1858–1921), British official in the Indian Army
- James Robert Smith (RAF officer) (1891–?), World War I flying ace
- James Webber Smith (1778–1853), British Royal Artillery officer

=== United States ===
- James Smith (Medal of Honor, 1864) (1826–1881), Medal of Honor recipient in the American Civil War
- James Smith (Medal of Honor, 1872) (1838–?), Medal of Honor recipient for peacetime actions
- James Smith (frontiersman) (1737–1813), American leader of the Black Boys Rebellion against British rule in colonial America
- James A. Smith (Medal of Honor) (1880–1944), Medal of Honor recipient in the Boxer Rebellion
- James C. Smith (general) (1923–2016), U.S. Army general
- James E. Smith (general) (born 1973), U.S. Space Force general
- James Floyd Smith (1884–1956), American test pilot and instructor for Glenn Martin
- James Milton Smith (1823–1890), American soldier and politician
- James Thomas Smith (1908–1990), U.S. Navy admiral
- James Webster Smith (1850–1876), first black cadet at West Point

=== Other countries ===
- James Smith (Texas general) (1792–1855), general in the Revolutionary Army of Texas
- James Argyle Smith (1831–1901), Confederate general in the American Civil War

== Politicians, judges, and civil servants ==
=== United States ===
- James Smith (Kansas politician), Kansas secretary of state
- James Smith (New Mexico politician), member of the New Mexico House of Representatives
- James Smith (Pennsylvania politician) (1720–1806), Pennsylvania delegate who signed the United States Declaration of Independence
- James Smith Jr. (1851–1927), U.S. senator from New Jersey
- James Smith, 19th-century Canadian Cree Chief, founder of the James Smith First Nation in Saskatchewan
- James A. Smith (mayor), first mayor of the city of Ridgefield, Washington
- James B. Smith (born 1952), former US ambassador to Saudi Arabia
- James C. Smith (politician) (born 1940), former Florida attorney general
- James E. Smith (politician, born 1930) (1930–2020), comptroller of the currency of the United States, 1973–1976
- James E. Smith (Montana politician) (born 1948)
- James E. Smith Jr. (born 1967), member of the South Carolina House of Representatives
- James F. Smith (Michigan politician) (1923–2007), member of the Michigan House of Representatives
- James H. Smith Jr. (1909–1982), U.S. assistant secretary of the Navy (AIR), 1953–1956, sailor and Olympic champion
- James Horace Smith (1852–1931), mayor of Orlando
- James J. Smith (FBI agent), American FBI agent
- James L. Smith (Missouri politician) (1917-2000), member of the Missouri House of Representatives
- James M. Smith (c. 1810–1898), New York City politician and judge
- James Milton Smith (1823–1890), American soldier and politician
- James Monroe Smith (Georgia planter) (1839–1915), planter and state legislator in Georgia, U.S.
- James Peyton Smith (1925–2006), Louisiana politician
- James Strudwick Smith (1790–1859), U.S. Representative from North Carolina
- James T. Smith Jr. (born 1942), American, county executive of Baltimore County, Maryland
- James Vernon Smith (1926–1973), U.S. representative from Oklahoma
- James W. Smith Jr. (born 1943), American judge, Chief of the Supreme Court of Mississippi
- James Y. Smith (1809–1876), American, governor of Rhode Island

=== Canada ===
- James Smith (1806–1868), lawyer, judge and political figure in Quebec
- James Smith (Canada West politician) (1811–1874), lawyer, judge and politician in Canada West
- James Smith (Yukon politician) (1919–2017), former commissioner of the Yukon Territory, 1966–1976
- James A. Smith (Canadian politician) (1911–1993), Canadian member of parliament
- James Bidwell Smith, MLA in Saskatchewan
- James Edward Smith (politician) (1831–1892), mayor of Toronto
- James Sinclair Smith (1816–1897), Scottish-born Canadian politician

=== Australia ===
- James Smith (New South Wales politician) (1887–1962), former member of the New South Wales Legislative Assembly
- James Francis Smith (politician) (1844–1908), New South Wales politician
- James Joynton Smith (1858–1943), Australian politician
- James MacCallum Smith (1868–1939), Australian politician, newspaper proprietor and stock breeder
- James Norton Smith (1846–1911), Tasmanian politician
- James Thorneloe Smith (1825–1902), engineer and politician in Queensland
- James Vinton Smith (1897–1952), Australian politician

=== United Kingdom ===
- James Smith (1587–1667), alderman of the City of London
- James Masterton-Smith (1878–1938), British civil servant
- James Parker Smith (1854–1929), British member of parliament for Glasgow Partick, 1890–1906

=== Other countries ===
- James Alfred Smith (1913–1993), British diplomat, chief justice of the Bahamas
- James Carmichael Smith (postmaster) (1852 – after 1914), postmaster in the Bahamas and Sierra Leone
- James Francis Smith (1859–1928), U.S. administrator, governor of the Philippines, 1906–1909
- James Skivring Smith (1825–1892), U.S.-born vice president, 1870–1872, and interim president, 1871–1872, of Liberia
- James Skivring Smith Jr. (1891–1950), Liberian politician

== Religious scholars and leaders ==
- James Smith (archbishop of St Andrews and Edinburgh) (1841–1928), Roman Catholic archbishop in Scotland
- James Smith (archdeacon of Barnstaple) (died 1667), archdeacon of Barnstaple
- James Smith (archdeacon of Connor) (1800–1865), Anglican priest in Ireland
- James Smith (vicar-apostolic of the Northern District) (1645–1711), English Roman Catholic vicar-apostolic
- James Smith (moderator) (1803–1897), Church of Scotland minister and moderator of the General Assembly
- James Allwood Smith (1806–1882), American minister and state legislator
- James Elishama Smith (1801–1857), British journalist and religious writer
- James E. Smith (biblical scholar) (born 1939), American biblical scholar
- James K. A. Smith (born 1970), Canadian-American proponent of radical orthodoxy
- James Lindsay Smith (c. 1816–c. 1883), American slave narrative author and minister
- James Martin Smith (1892–1970), American civic, business, and religious leader in Arizona
- James Tuttle Smith (1870–1910), rector of the Church of the Resurrection in Manhattan

== Scientists and academics ==
=== Biologists, botanists, and zoologists ===
- James Smith (gardener) (died 1789), gardener who journeyed to New Holland (Australia) in 1789
- James Smith (Scottish botanist) (1763–1848), Scottish botanist
- James Edward Smith (botanist) (1759–1828), English botanist and founder of the Linnean Society of London
- James Eric Smith (1909–1990), British zoologist
- J. L. B. Smith (James Leonard Brierley Smith, 1897–1968), South African ichthyologist

=== Physicians ===
- James Smith (American physician) (1771-1841), American physician and vaccine expert
- James Smith (anaesthetist) (1917–1986), Scottish anaesthetist
- James Greig Smith (1854–1897), Scottish surgeon and medical author
- James Lorrain Smith (1862–1931), Scottish pathologist
- James McCune Smith (1813–1865), American physician and activist

=== Other scientists and academics ===
- James Smith (university principal) (1681–1736), Scottish principal of the University of Edinburgh, 1732–1736
- James Smith of Jordanhill (1782–1867), Scottish merchant, antiquarian, architect, geologist and biblical critic
- James Allan Smith (1841–1918), dean of St David's
- James B. Smith (born 1952), dean of engineering, technology, and aeronautics at Southern New Hampshire University; former US ambassador to Saudi Arabia
- James Ernest Smith (1881–1973), founder and first president of the National Radio Institute in Washington, D.C.
- James Cuthbert Smith (born 1954), Director of Research at the Francis Crick Institute in London
- James E. Smith (engineer) (born 1950), computer engineer and professor at the University of Wisconsin–Madison
- James George Smith (1819–1849), American founder of Beta Theta Pi, a prominent college fraternity
- James John Smith (1892–1983), Irish applied mathematician and electrical engineer
- James K. A. Smith (born 1970), Canadian-born philosopher
- James M. Smith, president of Eastern Michigan University
- James Monroe Smith (academic administrator) (1888–1949), American educator and academic administrator in Louisiana
- James Morton Smith (1919–2012), American historian
- James Perrin Smith (1864–1931), American geologist and paleontologist
- James Reuel Smith (1852–1935), American photographer and amateur historian

== Sportspeople ==
=== American football ===
- J. D. Smith (fullback, born 1936), American football player
- James Smith (American football) (born 2005), American football player

=== Association football ===
- James Smith (footballer, born 1844) (1844–1876), Scottish footballer, played in the first official international football match
- James Smith (footballer, born 1873) (1873–?), Scottish footballer
- James Smith (footballer, born 1887) (1887-?), English footballer; see List of Fulham F.C. players
- James Smith (footballer, born 1908) (1908–1956), English left back who played for Doncaster Rovers, Lincoln City and Bradford City
- James Smith (Scottish footballer) (fl. 1922), Scottish football player (Port Vale)
- Jimmy Smith (footballer, born 1930) (1930–2022), English footballer for Chelsea and Leyton Orient
- James Smith (footballer, born 1985), English football player (Southport)

=== Boxing ===
- James Smith (boxer) (born 1953), American boxer nicknamed "Bonecrusher"
- James Smith (sports media figure) (born 1959), American boxer and host of In This Corner

=== Cricket ===
- James Smith (Kent cricketer) (fl. 1792–1796), English cricketer
- James Smith (New South Wales cricketer) (1880–1958), Australian cricketer
- James Smith (New Zealand cricketer) (1891–1971), New Zealand cricketer
- James Crosbie Smith (1894–1980), English cricketer
- James Smith (Leicestershire cricketer) (born 1977), English cricketer
- James Smith (South Australia cricketer) (born 1988), Australian cricketer

=== Other sports ===
- James Aikman Smith (1859–1931), Scottish rugby union player and referee
- James Smith (Australian rules footballer) (1899–1974), Australian rules footballer for Richmond Football Club
- James R. Smith (1904–1986), American water polo player and coach
- James W. Smith (horse trainer) (1908–1969), American horse trainer
- James Smith (runner) (born 1913), American middle-distance runner, 1500 m runner-up at the 1937 USA Outdoor Track and Field Championships
- James Smith (sport shooter) (1931–2021), American Olympic shooter
- Jimmy Snuka (James Wiley Smith, 1943–2017), Fijian wrestler
- Steve Smith (ice hockey, born April 30, 1963), Scottish-born Canadian ice hockey player
- James Smith (Gaelic footballer) (born 1999), Irish Gaelic footballer

== Other people ==
- James Smith (gardener) (died 1789), gardener who journeyed to New Holland (Australia) in 1789
- James Smith (miner) (1827–1897), Australian miner
- James Smith (draper) (1765–1823), close friend of Robert Burns
- James Smith (murderer) (1936–1962), English murderer
- James Edward Smith (murderer) (1952–1990), American murderer executed in Texas
- James Lawrence Smith (1889–1950), co-owner of the Brooklyn Dodgers baseball team
- James Martin Smith (1892–1970), American civic, business, and religious leader in Arizona
- James McCune Smith (1813–1865), American physician and activist
- James W. Smith (trade unionist) (1838–1903), American labor unionist

== Other uses ==
- James Smith Cree Nation, Saskatchewan, Canada
  - James Smith 100, an Indian reserve
- James Smith & Sons, an umbrella shop in London
- Sir James Smith's School, a secondary school in Camelford, North Cornwall, England
- James Smith, a character in the film 8 Mile

== See also ==
- Epitaph for James Smith, a 1785 satirical Scots epitaph written by poet Robert Burns
- Jim Smith (disambiguation)
- Jimmy Smith (disambiguation)
- Jamie Smith (disambiguation)
- James Smyth (disambiguation)
