= J. Smith =

J. Smith may refer to:

== People ==
- J. Smith (1840s cricketer) (fl. 1840s), English cricketer
- J. Smith (footballer) (fl. 1889–1890), English footballer
- J. Smith (Gentlemen cricketer, 1833), English cricketer
- J. Smith (VC) (1822–1866), English recipient of the Victoria Cross
- J. D. Smith (offensive tackle) (born 1936)
- J. L. Smith (fl. 1953), American pitcher
- J. L. B. Smith (1897–1968), South African ichthyologist
- J. R. Smith (born 1985), American basketball player
- J. T. Smith (American football) (born 1955), American football wide receiver

== Other uses ==
- "J. Smith" (song), 2008 song by Travis from the album Ode to J. Smith

== See also ==
- J. Alfred Smith (1931–2025), American pastor
- J. Beverley Smith (born 1931), Welsh historian
- J Carington Smith (1908–1972), Australian artist
- J. Eric Smith (born 1957), President of Swiss Re Americas
- J. L. Smith (Hualapai Smith) (c. 1817–1887), Forty-Niner and Arizona pioneer
- J. L. Smith (politician) (died 1867), mayor of Dallas, Texas
- J. Waldo Smith (1861–1933), American civil engineer
- J. Walter Smith (1869–1931), American magazine editor
- J. William Smith (1868–1937), Canadian politician
- J. A. Smith (disambiguation)
- J. D. Smith (disambiguation)
- J. H. Smith (disambiguation)
- J. J. Smith (disambiguation)
- J. P. Smith (disambiguation)
- J. T. Smith (disambiguation)
- James Smith (disambiguation)
- Jay Smith (disambiguation)
- John Smith (disambiguation)
- Joseph Smith (disambiguation)
- E. J. Smith (disambiguation)
- Smith (disambiguation)
- List of people with surname Smith
