= Smitty =

Smitty may refer to:

== People ==
- Smitty (rapper), American rapper
- Smitty the Jumper (1898–1995), American parachutist and skydiver H. Truesdell Smith
- Big Bad Smitty (1940–2002), American blues guitar player and singer born John H. Smith
- Smitty Duke (1942–2010), American volleyball player who competed in the 1968 Summer Olympics
- Smitty Gatlin, former singer with the American country and gospel group The Oak Ridge Boys
- Jean-Guy Gendron (born 1934), Canadian retired National Hockey League and World Hockey Association (WHA) player and WHA head coach
- William "Smitty" Pignatelli (born 1959), American politician
- Charles Schmid (1942–1975), American serial killer
- Brian Smith (ice hockey, born 1940) (1940–1995), Canadian National Hockey League player and sportscaster
- Devonta Smith (born 1998), American National Football League player
- Edward "Smitty" Smith (born 1980), American lawyer and government administrator
- James Smith (sports media figure) (born 1959), American host of the television boxing show In This Corner
- James "Smitty" Smith, former member of the American rock band Three Dog Night
- Marvin Smith (born 1961), American jazz drummer
- Merriman Smith (1913–1970), American journalist
- Michael W. Smith (born 1957), American musician
- Mike "Smitty" Smith (1942–2001), drummer with the American rock band Paul Revere & the Raiders
- Mike Smith (broadcaster) (1955–2014), English television and radio presenter
- Thurston Smith (born 1958), American politician
- Scott "Smitty" Smith, member of the American children's band Imagination Movers
- William "Smitty" Smith (1944–1997), Canadian keyboardist and session musician

== Fictional characters ==
- Jacob "Smitty" Smith, on the television series Ray Donovan
- Morton "Smitty" Smith, on the American sitcom The Donna Reed Show
- "Smitty" Smith, on the television series Mad Men
- Smitty Ryker, on the American movie Hacksaw Ridge
- Smitty, in four episodes of the American sitcom The Cosby Show, played by Adam Sandler
- Smitty, in the animated Pixar film Monsters, Inc.
- "Lady Smitty" (Lady Winchester Huntington-Smythe Jones), in Veronica's Passport
- Officer Quigley Smitty, a recurring character on the police procedural crime drama "The Rookie"
- Officer Smitty, on the American sitcom Sanford and Son
- Officer Smitty, on the animated television series Futurama
- Slick Smitty, in the show Slylock Fox & Comics for Kids
- Smitty, in the sitcom "Will & Grace"
- Smitty Werbenjägermanjensen, a facetious character introduced in the SpongeBob SquarePants episode One Krabs Trash

== Other uses ==
- Smitty (comic strip), a nationally syndicated comic strip from 1922 to 1973
- Smitty (film), a 2012 family film
- Camp Smitty, a temporary military base; see List of the United States military installations in Iraq
- Smitty's, a restaurant chain in Canada
