= James Carmichael Smith =

James Carmichael Smith may refer to:

- Sir James Carmichael-Smyth, 1st Baronet (1779–1838), British Army officer and colonial administrator
- James Carmichael Smyth (physician) (1742–1821), his father, Scottish physician and medical writer
- James Carmichael Smith (postmaster) (1852 – after 1914), postmaster in the Bahamas and Sierra Leone

== See also ==
- James Smith (disambiguation)
