= Smith baronets of Isleworth (1694) =

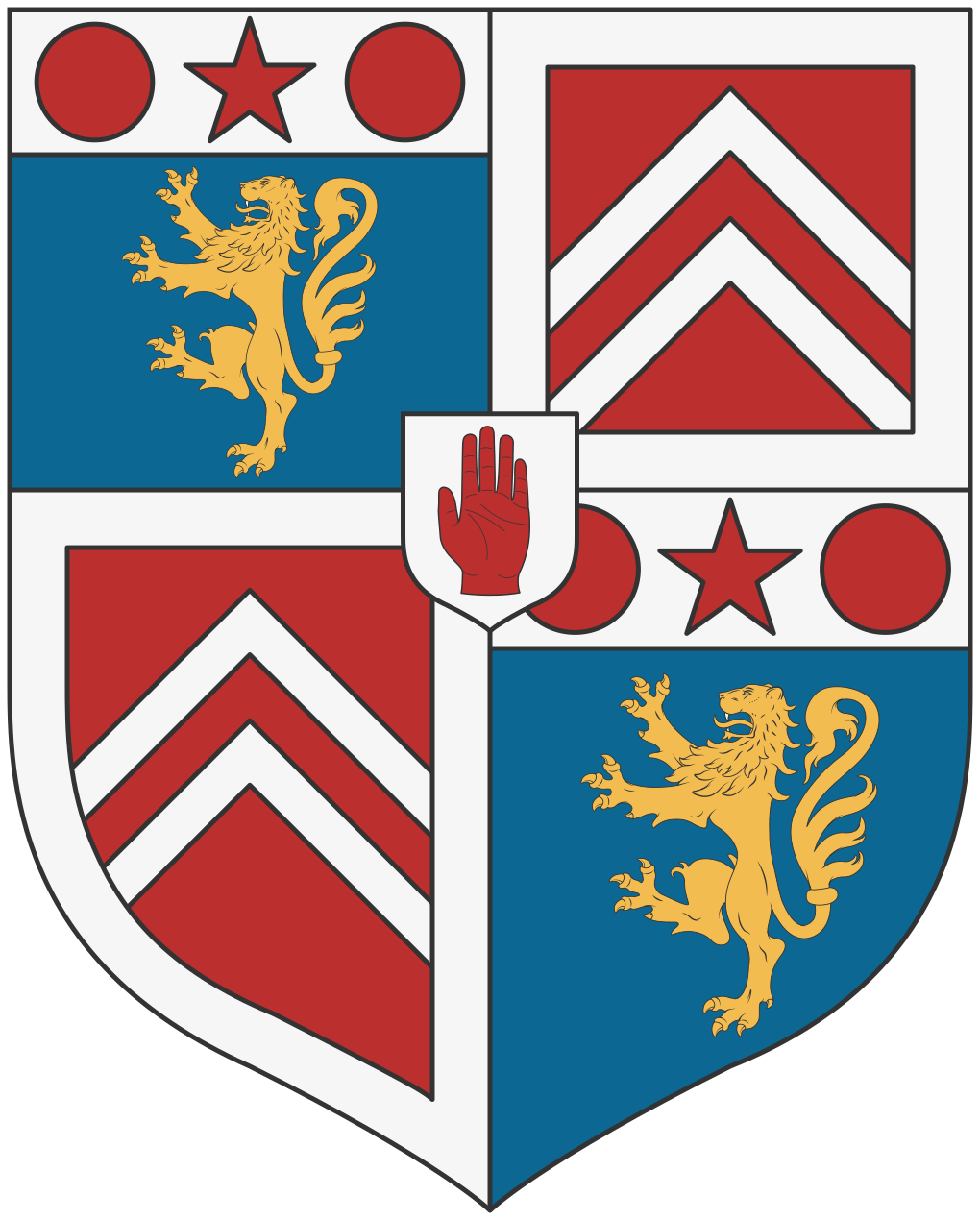
The coat of arms of the Smiths Isleworth

The Smith baronetcy of Isleworth, Middlesex was created on 20 April 1694 in the Baronetage of England for John Smith. Smith was a London merchant, who had loaned money towards the English participation in the Nine Years' War.

Smith was a son of Alderman John Smith (died 1673); and a grandson of Alderman James Smith (1587–1667).

== Smith baronets of Isleworth, Middlesex (1694) ==
- Sir John Smith, 1st Baronet (died 16 August 1726)
- Sir John Smith, 2nd Baronet (died 11 October 1760). Extinct on his death.
