= E. J. Smith =

E. J. Smith may refer to:

== Politicians ==
- Edward J. Smith (American politician) (1927–2010), American politician
- Edward J. Smith (Canadian politician) (1819–1903), Canadian politician

== Other ==
- Eddie Smith (basketball) (born 1983), basketball player
- Edward Smith (sea captain) (1850–1912), captain of the RMS Titanic
- E. J. Smith (American football) (born 2002), American football player

== See also ==
- J. E. Smith
- J. Smith (disambiguation)
- Smith (disambiguation)
- List of people with the surname Smith
