= Little Liberia =

Little Liberia may refer to:

Liberian neighborhoods:

- Little Liberia, Staten Island

Other:

- Mary and Eliza Freeman Houses, a neighborhood in Bridgeport, Connecticut settled by free blacks starting in the early nineteenth century.
