= J. J. Smith =

J. J. Smith may refer to:

- J. J. Smith (Gaelic footballer), Carlow Gaelic footballer
- J. J. Smith (author) (born 1970), American author, nutritionist and weight management expert
- J. J. Smith or J. J. Sm., Johannes Jacobus Smith (1867–1947), Dutch botanist
- James J. Smith, FBI Supervisory Special agent
- James John Smith (electrical engineer), American applied mathematician
- J. J. Smith (linguist) (1883–1949), South African linguistics

== See also ==
- J. Smith (disambiguation)
- JJ (disambiguation)
- List of people with surname Smith
