= Jay Smith =

Jay Smith may refer to:

- Jay Smith (basketball) (born 1961), American basketball coach
- Jay Smith (footballer, born September 1981), English football player for Southend and Notts County
- Jay Smith (footballer, born December 1981), English football player for Brentford
- Jay R. Smith (1915–2002), American child actor and comedian
- J. R. Smith (born 1985), American basketball player
- Jay C. Smith (1929–2009), former principal accused of murder
- Jay "Saint" Smith, American songwriter
- Jay Smith (Christian apologist) (born 1954), American Christian apologist
- Jay Smith, member of the band Sinch
- Jay Smith (singer) (born 1981), Swedish singer and winner of Swedish Idol in 2010

== See also ==
- J. Smith (disambiguation)
- James Smith (disambiguation)
- Jason Smith (disambiguation)
