= John Henry Smith (disambiguation) =

John Henry Smith (1848–1911) was a member of the Quorum of the Twelve Apostles and the First Presidency of The Church of Jesus Christ of Latter-day Saints.

John Henry Smith may also refer to:

- J. H. Smith (mayor) (1858–1956), mayor of Everett, Washington and co-founder of Anchorage, Alaska
- John Henry Smith (politician) (1881–1953), Australian politician
- John Henry Smith (reporter) (21st century), American sports journalist
- John H. Smith (bishop) (1939–2012), bishop of the Episcopal Diocese of West Virginia
