= J. A. Smith =

J. A. Smith may refer to:

- John Alexander Smith (1863–1939), Idealist philosopher
- J. Albert Smith, 19th century footballer
- J. Andre Smith (1880–1959), American war artist
- Justus Albert Smith (1896–1971), politician in Ontario, Canada

== See also ==
- James A. Smith (disambiguation)
- John A. Smith (disambiguation)
