= Jamie Smith =

Jamie Smith may refer to:

- Jamie Smith (actor) (1921–2002), American actor
- Jamie Smith (cartoonist) (born c. 1965), Alaskan cartoonist
- Jamie Smith (cricketer) (born 2000), English cricketer
- Jamie Smith (curler) (born 2001), Canadian curler
- Jamie Smith (field hockey) (born 1965), New Zealand field hockey player
- Jamie Smith (footballer, born 1974), English footballer (Wolverhampton Wanderers, Crystal Palace and Bristol City)
- Jamie Smith (footballer, born 1980), Scottish footballer (Celtic, ADO Den Haag, Aberdeen and Colorado Rapids)
- Jamie Smith (footballer, born 1978), Scottish footballer
- Jamie Smith (footballer, born 1989), English footballer (Crystal Palace, Brighton & Hove Albion and Leyton Orient)
- Jamie Smith (footballer, born 1997), football defender for Greenville Triumph
- Jamie Smith (footballer, born 2002), Scottish footballer (Hamilton Accies)
- Jamie Smith (rugby union) (born 1988), Irish rugby union footballer of the 2010s
- Jamie xx (Jamie Smith, born 1988), member of band The xx
- Jamie Smith (politician) (born 1971), member of the South Dakota House of Representatives
- Jamie Renée Smith (born 1987), American actress

== See also ==
- James Smith (disambiguation)
