= James Smythe =

James Smythe may refer to:

- James Moore Smythe (1702–1734), English playwright and fop
- James Anderson Smythe, a.k.a. James Anderson (1849–1918), Texas–Indian wars soldier
- James Smythe (novelist) (born 1980), British writer

== See also ==
- James Smyth (disambiguation)
