= Afro-Caribbean leftism =

Political movement in the Caribbean

Afro-Caribbean leftism refers to left-wing political currents that have developed among various African-Caribbean communities in the Caribbean, the United States of America, France, Great Britain, or anywhere else they have chosen to settle.

== Spenceans ==
During the early nineteenth century, the Jamaican-born activists William Davidson and Robert Wedderburn were drawn to the politics of Thomas Spence.

== Interwar era ==
Many Afro-Caribbean soldiers who served in the British West Indies Regiment (BWIR) became left-wing activists after the war during the interwar era. While serving in European and Middle Eastern fronts of the First World War, experiences of discrimination from white servicemen inspired a resurgence in anti-colonial nationalism among the British West Indian islands. The 9th Battalion of the BWIR initiated the Taranto Revolt, a mutiny against poor working conditions and a wage increase awarded to white but not black servicemen by the War Office. In response, the Worcestershire Regiment was dispatched to Taranto to suppress the mutiny; sixty BWIR servicemen were tried for mutiny, with one serviceman being sentenced to death by firing squad. Between 50 and 60 BWIR sergeants met on 17 December, 1918 to form the left-wing Caribbean League, which held four meetings in the following weeks. Aside from discussing various grievances held by the servicemen, the Caribbean League also discussed Caribbean nationalism and plans for a West Indian independence movement. Members of the League made plans to establish an office in Kingston, Jamaica, and organise strikes. After the colonial government started to crack down on the League, it disbanded. In February 1919, Army Order No. 1 was issued, extending the wage increase to the BWIR.

== Prominent Afro-Caribbean leftists ==
- Toussaint Louverture (1743–1803), Haiti
- Robert Wedderburn (1762–1835/6?), Jamaica
- William Davidson (1781–1820), Jamaica
- William Cuffay (1788–1870) Gillingham, Kent, father from St Kitts
- James Carmichael Smith (1852–1919), Bahamas
- Hubert Harrison (1883–1927), St Croix
- Cyril Briggs (1888–1966), Nevis
- Claude McKay (1889–1948), Jamaica
- Richard B. Moore (1893–1978), Barbados
- C. L. R. James (1901–1989), Trinidad
- George Padmore (1903–1959), Trinidad
- Aimé Césaire (1913–2008), Martinique
- Claudia Jones (1915–1964), Trinidad
- Frantz Fanon (1925–1961), Martinique
- Stokely Carmichael (1941–1998), Trinidad
- Maurice Bishop (1944–1983), Grenada
- Bernard Coard (born 1944), Grenada
- Portia Simpson-Miller (born 1945), Jamaica
- Paul Gilroy (born 1956) London, mother from Guyana

== See also ==
- African-American leftism
