= Jason Smith =

Jason Smith may refer to:

== Sports ==
- Jason Smith (American football) (born 1986), American football player
- Jason Smith (Australian rules footballer) (born 1972), former Australian rules footballer
- Jason Smith (basketball, born 1974) (born 1974), Australian basketball player
- Jason Smith (basketball, born 1986), American basketball player
- Jason Smith (baseball) (born 1977), baseball player
- Jason Smith (boxer) (born 1973), Canadian boxer
- Jason Smith (cricketer) (born 1994), South African cricketer
- Jason Smith (curler) (born 1983), American curler
- Jason Smith (English footballer) (born 1974), English footballer
- Jason Smith (ice hockey) (born 1973), Canadian ice hockey defenceman
- Jason Smith (rugby league) (born 1972), Australian rugby league footballer
- Jason Smith (snowboarder) (born 1982), Olympic athlete
- Jason Smith (soccer), American soccer coach and former player
- Jason Smith (snooker player) (born 1964), English snooker player

== Entertainers ==
- Jason Smith (actor) (born 1984), Australian actor and singer
- Jason Smith (chef), American chef
- Jason Smith (visual effects), American visual effects artist
- Jason Matthew Smith (born 1972), American film and television actor
- Jason Samuels Smith (born 1980), American tap dance performer, choreographer, and director
- Jason Smith (born 1970), American sports radio host of AllNight with Jason Smith

== Other people ==
- Jason Smith (American politician) (born 1980), member of the United States House of Representatives for Missouri
- Jason Smith (curator), Australian art curator and public gallery director
- Jason Smith (New Zealand politician), mayor of Kaipara
- Jason Smith, a fictional American football quarterback from the 2023 film The Holdovers

== See also ==
- AllNight with Jason Smith, a former syndicated sports talk radio show on ESPN Radio
- Jason Martin-Smith (1972–2001), English murder victim
- Jay Smith (disambiguation)
- Jason Smyth (born 1987), Irish sprinter
- Jason Weir-Smith (born 1975), former tennis player from South Africa
