= James Smyth =

James Smyth may refer to:

- Sir James Smyth (English MP) (c. 1621–1681), English member of parliament for Exeter and Camelford
- Sir James Smyth, 1st Baronet (c. 1686–1717), sheriff of Sussex 1714–15
- James Smyth (Irish MP) (c. 1716–1771), Irish member of parliament for Antrim and Dundalk
- James Smyth (priest) (1683–1799), Anglican priest in Ireland
- James Carmichael Smyth (physician) (1742–1821), Scottish medical writer and physician to King George III
- Sir James Carmichael-Smyth, 1st Baronet (1779–1838), his son, British colonial administrator
- James Adger Smyth (1837–1920), mayor of Charleston, South Carolina
- Red Smyth (James Daniel Smyth, 1893–1958), American baseball player
- James G. Smyth (fl. mid-20th century), American politician
- Jimmy Smyth (hurler) (1931–2013), Irish hurler
- James Smyth (rugby union) (1891–1928), Irish international rugby union player
- James Martin Gordon Smyth, or Jim Smyth, retired Canadian police officer

== See also ==
- James Smythe (disambiguation)
- James Smith (disambiguation)
