= J. P. Smith =

J. P. Smith may refer to:

- JP Smith (politician), city councillor from Cape Town, South Africa
- JP Smith (rugby union, born 1990), South African/Australian rugby union player
- JP Smith (rugby union, born 1994), South African-born American international rugby union player
- John-Patrick Smith, Australian professional tennis player

== See also ==
- J. Smith (disambiguation)
