= J. H. Smith =

J. H. Smith may refer to:

- J. H. Smith (Mayor of Everett), American politician
- J. Harold Smith (1910–2001), American Southern Baptist
- J. Hubert Smith, American politician from Arizona
- Jeffrey H. Smith, American mathematician
- Joseph Henry Smith (born 1945), Ghanaian soldier and politician
- James H. Smith (physicist), American physicist, see David H. Frisch and 1963 in the United States

== See also ==
- John H. Smith (disambiguation)
- List of people with surname Smith
