= James Lindsay Smith =

American slave narrative author

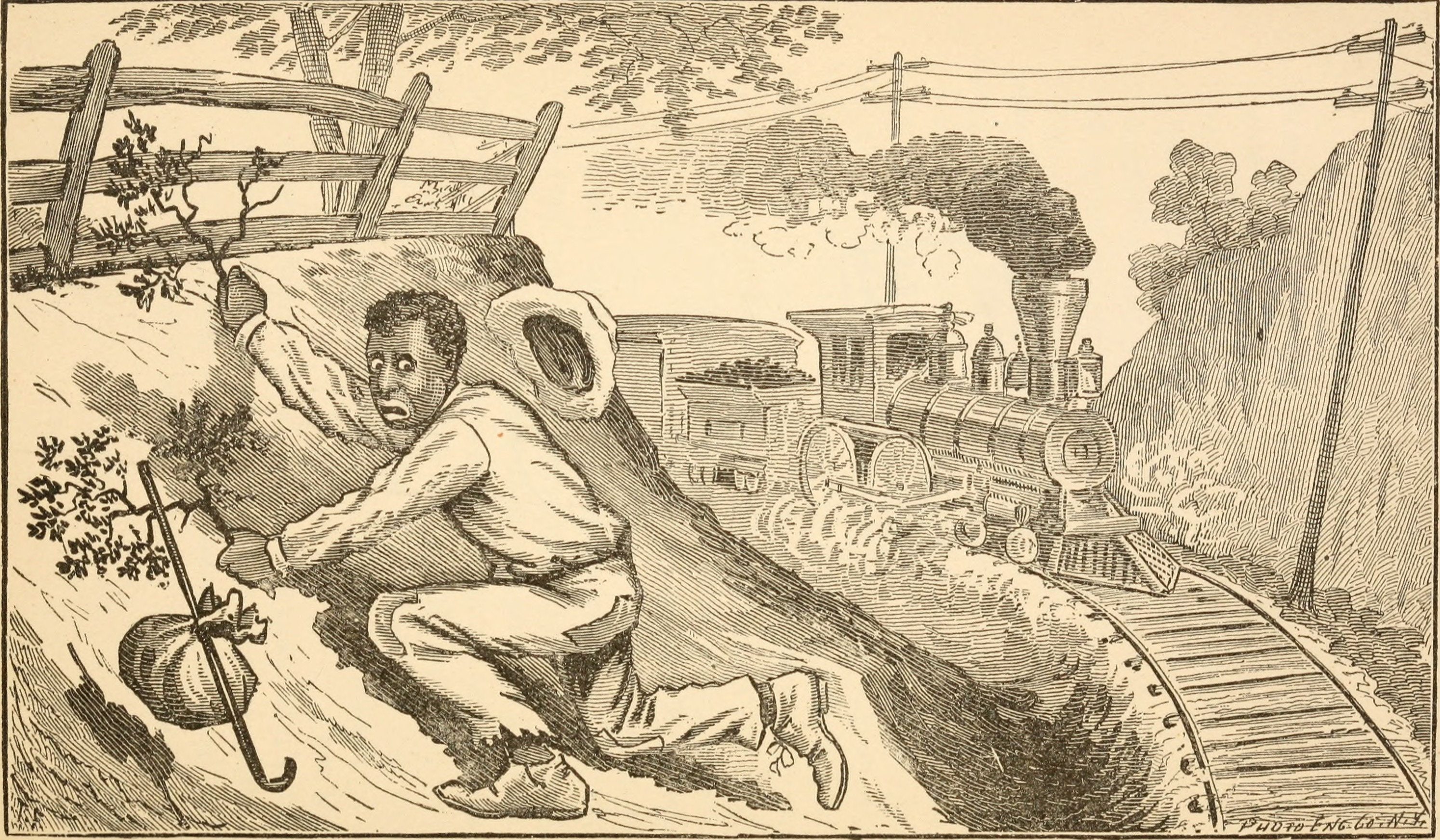
- Born: 1816; Northern Neck, Virginia, US
- Died: 1883 (aged 66–67); Norwich, Connecticut, US
- Occupations: Author, minister, shoemaker
- Writing career
- Language: English
- Subjects: Autobiography, slave narrative
- Notable work: Autobiography of James L. Smith (1881)

James Lindsay Smith (ca. 1816 – ca. 1883) was an American slave narrative author, minister, and shoemaker. His memoir Autobiography of James L. Smith (1881) was one of only six slave narratives published in Connecticut.

== Life ==
Born a slave on a plantation in Northumberland County, Virginia, Smith escaped in 1838, rowing across the Chesapeake Bay with two other fugitives in a canoe. After stops in New Castle, Philadelphia, and New York City and with the aid of abolitionists such as David Ruggles, Smith gained safety in Springfield, Massachusetts, via the Underground Railroad. In Massachusetts, he became a founding member of the African Methodist Episcopal Zion Church and attended Wilbraham Academy.

In 1842, Smith married Emmeline Minerva Platt and settled in Norwich, Connecticut, where he became a Methodist Episcopal minister and established a successful shoemaking business. His daughters, Louie and Emma, attended Norwich Free Academy and became teachers, while his son, James H. Smith, became a shoemaker like his father.

== Autobiography ==
In 1881, Smith published his memoirs, entitled Autobiography of James L. Smith, Including, Also, Reminiscences of Slave Life, Recollections of the War, Education of Freedmen, Causes of the Exodus, Etc. (Norwich: Press of The Bulletin Company, 1881). In this autobiography, he recounted his youth as a slave, his escape to freedom, and his later life in Massachusetts and Connecticut. In addition, he incorporated historical accounts of the American Civil War, the destruction the war inflicted on the South, the heroism of Black Union soldiers, and postwar Black emigration to the North.

== Legacy ==
Smith's house on School Street is a stop on Norwich's Freedom Trail and is a contributing property to Norwich's Jail Hill Historic District.
