= Church of the Resurrection (Manhattan) =

Church in Manhattan, New York

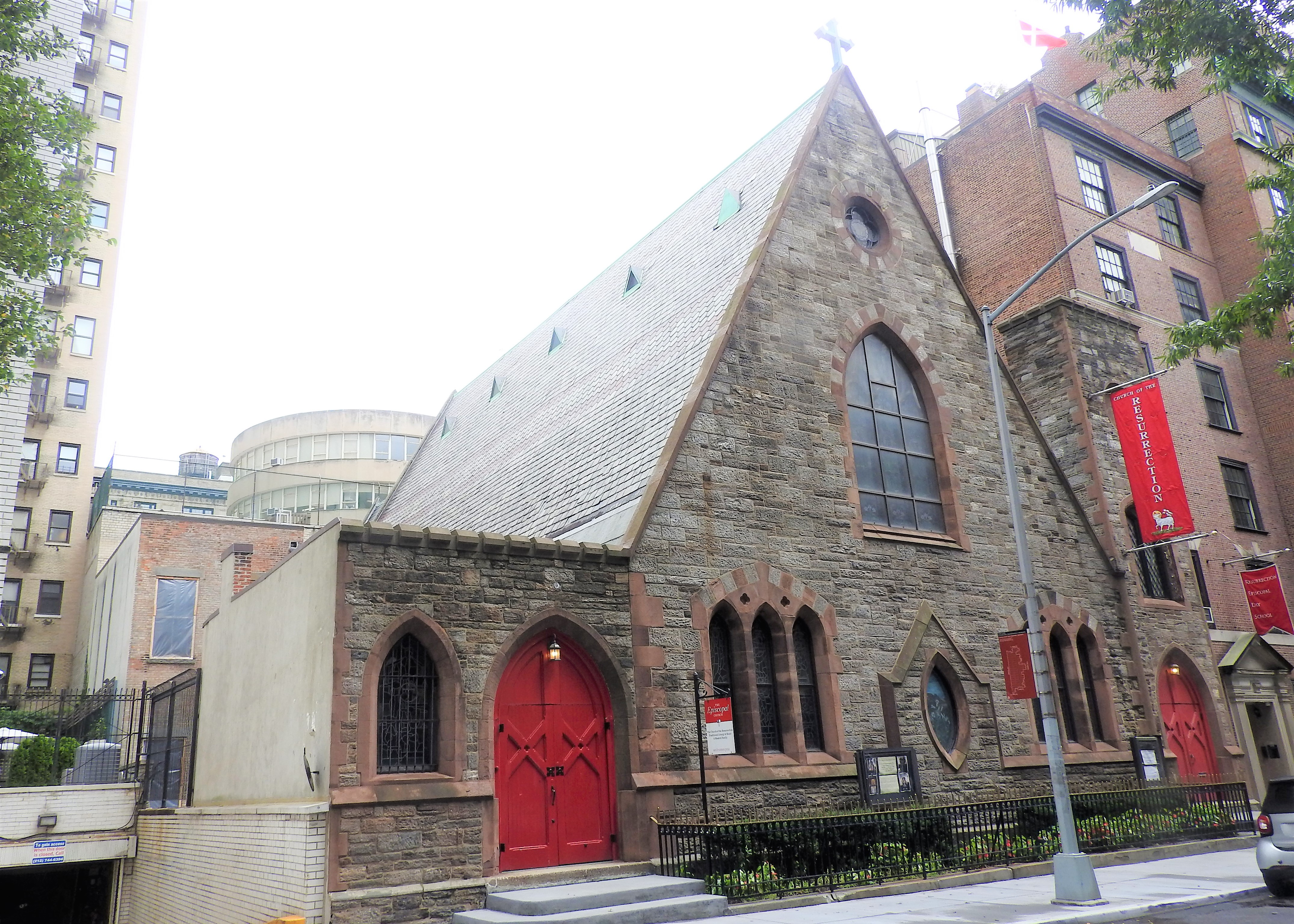
- South (front) facade, 2008

Religion
- Affiliation: Anglo-Catholic
- Leadership: Barry E. B. Swain SSC

Location
- Location: 119 East 74th Street, Manhattan, New York City
- Interactive map of Church of the Resurrection
- Coordinates: 40°46′20″N 73°57′42″W

Architecture
- Architect: James Renwick Jr.
- Style: Gothic Revival
- Completed: 1869

Specifications
- Direction of façade: South
- Materials: stone

Website
- resurrectionnyc.org

The Church of the Resurrection, located at 119 East 74th Street, Manhattan, New York City, is a parish of the Episcopal Diocese of New York in the Episcopal Church. It is the oldest church structure on the Upper East Side.

The church is Anglo-Catholic in doctrine and style, and has an extensive music program. The church falls on the Anglo-Papalist end of the Anglo-Catholic spectrum. Masses are in traditional language and reflect the Anglican and Western Catholic traditions of liturgy and music. In 2023, it reported 109 members, average attendance of 57, and $117,500 in plate and pledge income. No membership statistics were reported in 2024 national parochial reports.

== History ==
The Church of the Resurrection was founded in 1868 as the Church of the Holy Sepulchre by a group of Episcopalians. An armory for the 7th New York Militia was built nearby, and its chaplain, the Reverend James Tuttle Smith, became the first rector. The building was completed in 1869, and was designed by James Renwick Jr., who had earlier built Grace Church in Manhattan, and went on to design the Smithsonian Institution in Washington D.C., and St. Patrick's Cathedral.

Due to problems and lack of funds, his designs were not completely executed. The Great Rood of 1940 was carved by the Dutch sculptor Joep Nicolas. Since 1920, the Church of the Resurrection has been Anglo-Catholic in worship and doctrine.

== Resurrection Episcopal Day School ==
Resurrection Episcopal Day School is an independent, non-profit Montessori early childhood development school for children 3 years through 6 years of age. Housed in the parish building of the Church of the Resurrection, the school is a short distance from Central Park on the Upper East Side of Manhattan. It provides the following programs:

1. The Montessori Program
2. The Arts
3. Creative Movement and Physical Development
4. Afternoon Enrichment Program
5. Afternoon School Activities
6. Summer Camp

== Music programs ==
Resurrection's musicians offer settings of the Mass, motets, and other music every Sunday and on many feasts, often with a chamber orchestra. The choir is composed of professional singers, who appear on Sundays and major feast-days throughout the season. The hymns sung are drawn from the 1940 Hymnal, the New English Hymnal, and many other sources. Several small orchestras and early music groups present concerts at Resurrection.

== Worship services ==
Solemn Mass is offered on Sunday mornings according to The English Missal, with full ceremonial, choir, hymns, and a choral Mass setting. During the summer months a Sung Mass is offered instead of the regular Solemn Mass. It includes hymns and a setting of the Ordinary of the Mass for congregational singing. Low Mass is offered at 8:30 am on Sundays and daily throughout the week at regularly scheduled times.

== See also ==
- Guild of All Souls
- St Magnus the Martyr, the church's sister parish in London
