= John Emms (artist) =

English artist

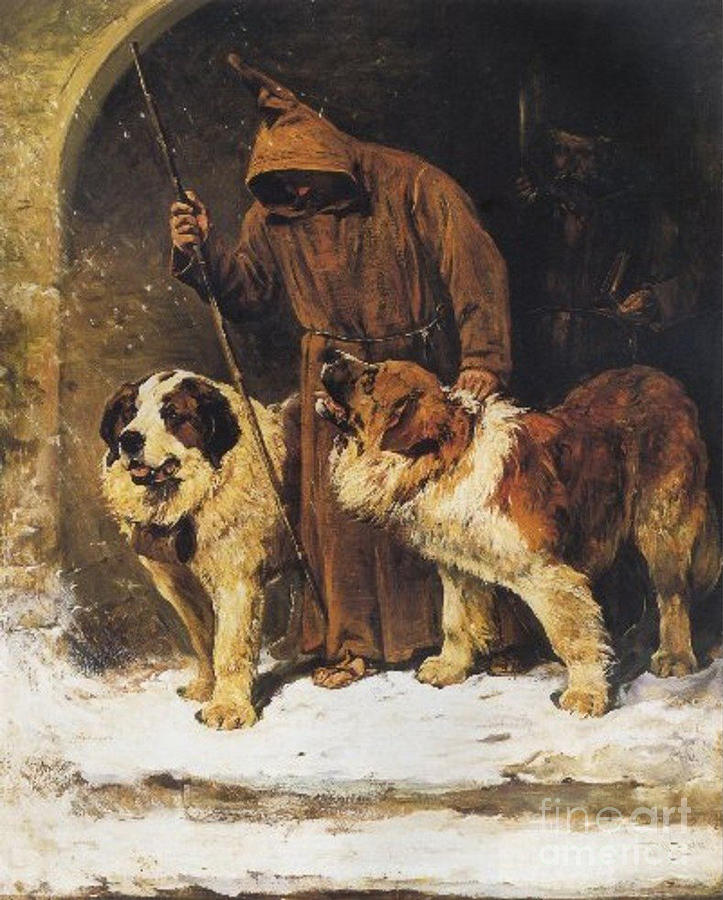
Painting by John Emms portraying two St. Bernards

John Emms (c. 1844 – 1 November 1912) was an English artist.

== Biography ==
Emms was born in Blofield, Norfolk, the son of artist Henry William Emms. He became an avid hunter and became famous for his paintings of horses, and of dogs, particularly foxhounds and terriers. He exhibited at the Royal Academy several times, beginning in 1866. His paintings are signed “Jno Emms”.

He married Fanny Primmer of Lyndhurst, Hampshire, in 1880. The couple lived in London for a time but returned to Lyndhurst in 1881 and built a large house and studio named The Firs, where Emms lived for the rest of his life. He died in Lyndhurst.

His painting of "Callum" a Dandie Dinmont Terrier hangs in the National Gallery of Scotland. In 1919, the owner of the dog, James Cowan Smith, donated £55,000 (£2,455,000 in 2025) to the National Gallery of Scotland with a requirement that obliged them to display the painting on its walls in perpetuity.

Emms is considered a painter of great ability. According to the American Kennel Club, his painting The New Forest Foxhounds is valued at an estimated $800,000–$1.2 million.
