= Mary and Eliza Freeman Houses =

- U.S. National Register of Historic Places
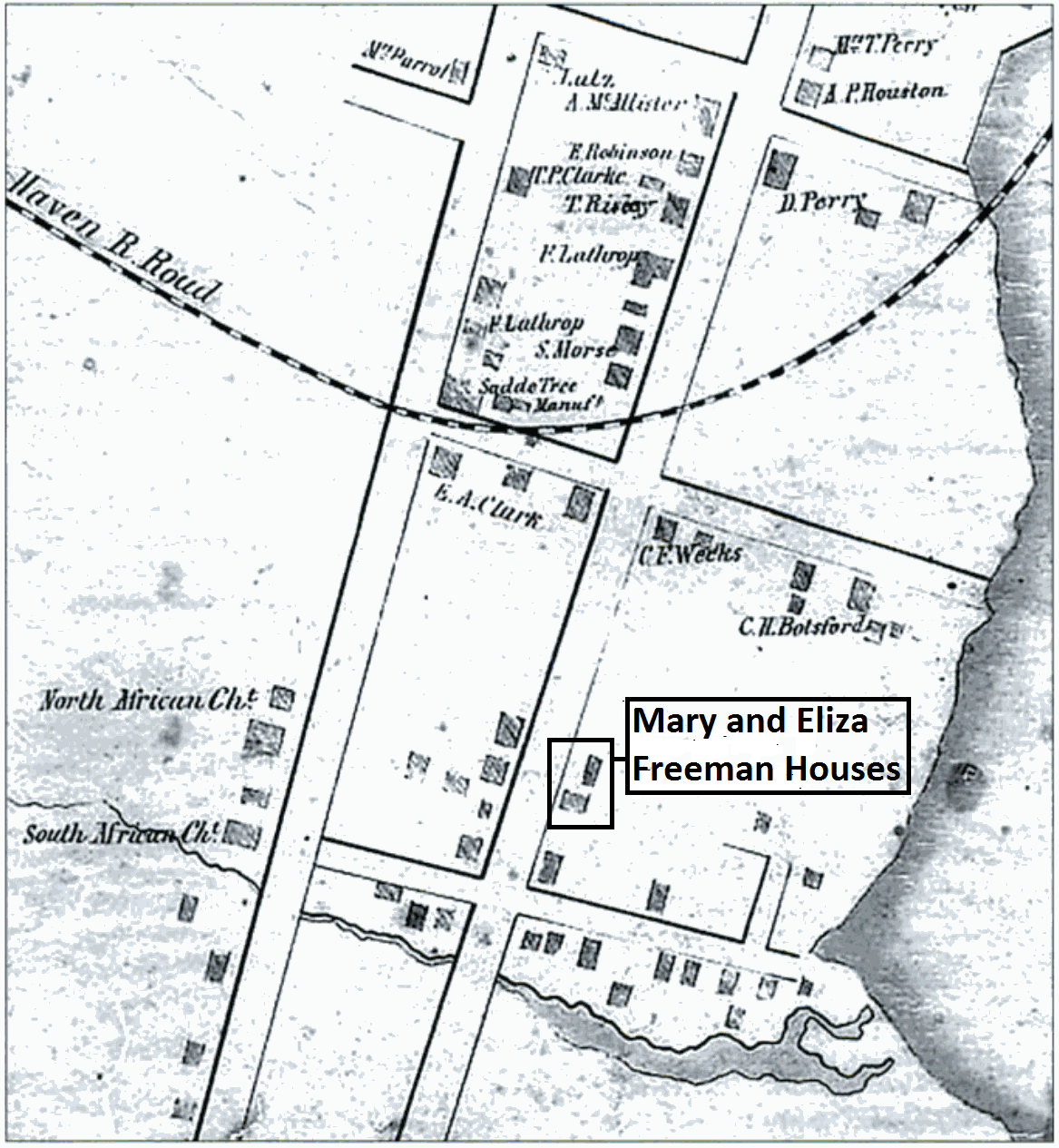
- Little Liberia in 1850--the houses of the African American community are delineated by the absence of their owners' names

- Location within Connecticut Location within the United States
- Location: 352-4 and 358-60 Main Street, Bridgeport, Connecticut
- Coordinates: 41°10′11″N 73°11′12″W
- Built: 1848
- Architectural style: Italian Villa, Greek Revival
- NRHP reference No.: 99000110
- Added to NRHP: February 22, 1999

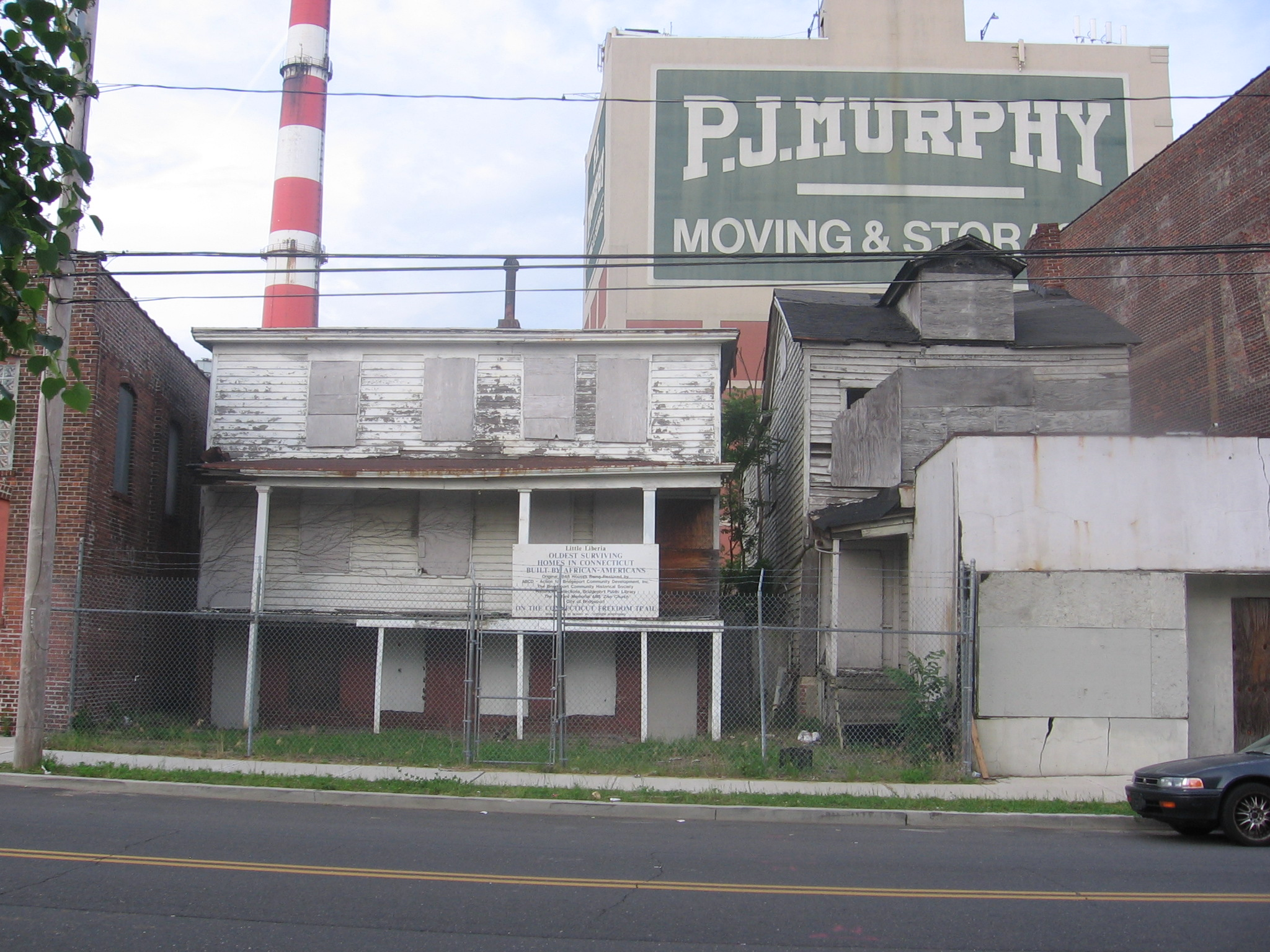
The houses as they appeared on June 8, 2012

The Mary and Eliza Freeman Houses are historic residences in Bridgeport, Connecticut. The simple, clapboard-covered dwellings were built in 1848 in what became known as Little Liberia, a neighborhood settled by free blacks starting in the first quarter of the nineteenth century. As the last surviving houses of this neighborhood on their original foundations, these were added to the National Register of Historic Places on February 22, 1999. The houses are the oldest remaining houses in Connecticut built by free blacks, before the state completed its gradual abolition of slavery in 1848. The homes and nearby Walter's Memorial A.M.E. Zion Church are also listed sites on the Connecticut Freedom Trail.

== Houses ==
The Mary and Eliza Freeman Houses are transitional late-Greek Revival/early-Victorian houses typical of their time and place. They are wood-frame structures built atop high masonry basements, necessitated by their location in a low-elevation shore front environment. Mary's house, the northernmost, was erected first, begun in April 1848 and completed by the following September. It is of Italianate vernacular design. It is a double house, four bays in width, with opposite side entrances, and two stories in height over a full English basement. It is surmounted by a pair of low-pitched hip roofs, and there is a veranda across the facade.

The interior has undergone very little remodeling from its time of construction, and retains original doors, mantels, and window and door casings. There are indications that it was originally constructed as a single-family house, and that portion to the south was a subsequent addition. Eliza's house was built beginning in September 1848, and completed over the fall and winter months. It is a Greek Revival half-house, three bays wide with a side entrance and side-gable roof. An attic dormer in the Victorian Gothic style was added circa 1862. A storefront was extended out from the facade in 1903 that was removed in the summer of 2013. The interior was scorched by fire in the late 1980s; however, enough original fabric survives so that a complete restoration is feasible.

== Owners ==
The original owners, Mary (1815-1883) and Eliza (1805–1862) Freeman, were free women of color born in Derby, Connecticut, then a center in the state for the free African American population. In 1848, the year rail transportation was inaugurated between Bridgeport and New York, they purchased two adjoining building lots in the South End of Bridgeport. The sisters had houses built and initially leased them out as rental properties while they continued to live and work in New York City.

Eliza Freeman returned to Bridgeport around 1855 to work as a domestic in the home of a well-to-do sea captain, and Mary (who is known to have been a hotel chef in the city) followed her around 1861. They both died quite well off for their times and situations (Mary's 1883 obituary in the Bridgeport Standard reads, 'Miss Mary Freeman, an old and well known colored lady, died at her residence at 114 Main Street yesterday ... The deceased ... had during her life accumulated considerable property, which is variously estimated from $30,000 to $50,000. She owned several houses on Main and Gregory Streets'), and as well-respected members of the community.

== Little Liberia community ==
Little Liberia was first settled by African Americans in 1821, the year Bridgeport became a municipality independent of Stratford. This was one of several similar neighborhoods in urban centers in the Northeast where free blacks gathered to make progress socially and economically. Other African-American communities developed in cities with growing job markets in the same time period include Trowbridge Square in New Haven, Jail Hill in Norwich, the northern slope of Boston's Beacon Hill, Sandy Ground on New York's Staten Island, and Hard Scrabble in Providence, Rhode Island. According to oral tradition, the name "Little Liberia" came from the community's inhabitants identifying with the new African colony of Liberia, established for American free blacks and freed slaves in the early 19th century by the American Colonization Society.

In 1831, Joel Freeman (1795-1865), brother of Mary and Eliza, purchased land where Whiting Street ended at Bridgeport Harbor; he moved a vacant shop building to the site and apparently converted it to his residence. In 1828—the year he moved to Bridgeport from Derby—he had been instrumental in establishing Zion Church, Fairfield County's first African-American congregation. The new organization erected a permanent home, officially the African Methodist Episcopal Zion Church, in 1835 at the southwest corner of Broad and Gregory streets. The church split into two societies in 1843, with a second edifice constructed at the northwest corner of Broad and Gregory.

The smaller congregation retained the original building and became known as Ebeneezer (later Bethel) Church. The Stratfield Special School for Colored Children was built soon after (1845), following a petition for State funds by Joel Freeman, at the southeast intersection of Main and Whiting streets. Zion Church, later renamed Walters Memorial African Methodist Episcopal Zion Church, reputedly served as a stop on the Underground Railroad. The AME Zion churches were part of an independent black denomination founded in 1787 in Philadelphia. By 1850, the Collins & Clark map showed the two churches on Broad Street, designated (improperly) North African Church and South African Church.

In 1998, a 104-year-old resident, who had arrived in Bridgeport nearly a century earlier when her family moved north from Virginia, described her neighborhood:

Little Liberia was a close-knit, safe African-American community where family life was highly respected and the spirit of the community was evident and prevailed, even during hard times.

First called "Ethiope," the community developed as a village of free blacks, Native Americans, and Haitians. In addition to the churches and school, the village had its own commercial businesses, free lending library, and social organizations. In addition, there was a seaside resort hotel ('Duncan House') built in 1853 that catered to a well-to-do African American clientele from the major metropolitan centers of the Northeast. "Ethiopis," as they were called, were in touch with other free black communities—for instance, hosting lecturers from New York City and Brooklyn. In 1895, orator and author Willis Augustus Hodges, who had been an abolitionist in Brooklyn, New York, addressed the "Young Colored Men's Republican Club" of Bridgeport on the topic of not being misled by "Negro Democrats." He spoke out against African Americans in New York and other mid-Atlantic states who were encouraging their fellows to vote for Democratic candidates.

Hodges noted that the Democrats in the South had worked against African Americans to deprive them of suffrage and other rights. At the time, southern legislatures dominated by white Democrats were passing new constitutions and laws to disfranchise blacks throughout the South and prevent them from voting. Blacks were essentially shut out of the official political system in the South from the turn of the century until after passage of federal civil rights legislation in the 1960s.

== Preservation ==
By early 2010, the two Freeman houses had long been vacant, and in initial reports were said to be near collapse. For one, rebuilding, as opposed to restoration, was reported as possibly required (demolition of non-historic additions to the properties in the Summer of 2013 proved that both structures were, in fact, quite sound). At that time, Mayor Bill Finch announced $47,000 in Community Development Block Grant funds for the houses. A newly formed Mary & Eliza Freeman Center for History and Community set about fundraising, including appeals to organizations such as the 1772 Foundation and the National Trust for Historic Preservation. The Freeman Center's goal is to operate these as a Little Liberia joint house museum, available to school groups and historical tours and researchers. The city sold the houses to the Freeman Center, clearing up a dispute over back taxes and fees with an earlier organization seeking to preserve the homes. In late 2025, work commenced on a restoration of the houses.

== See also ==
- History of Bridgeport, Connecticut
- National Register of Historic Places listings in Bridgeport, Connecticut
