= John H. Smith =

John H. Smith may refer to:

- John H. Smith (bishop) (1939–2012), sixth bishop of the Episcopal Diocese of West Virginia, 1989–1999
- John H. Smith (mathematician), American mathematician
- J. H. Smith (mayor) (1858–1956), mayor of Everett, Washington and co-founder of Anchorage, Alaska
- John Henry Smith (1848–1911), leader of The Church of Jesus Christ of Latter-day Saints and a Utah politician
- John Henry Smith (reporter), anchor and reporter for News 12 Long Island
- John Henry Smith (politician) (1881–1953), Australian politician
- John Hilary Smith (born 1928), British colonial governor and administrator in Nigeria and Oceania
- John Hope Smith (died 1831), British colonial head of the Gold Coast colony
- John Hugh Smith (1819–1870), three-time mayor of Nashville, Tennessee between 1845 and 1865
- J. Hyatt Smith (1824–1886), clergyman and United States Representative from New York

== See also ==
- John Smith (disambiguation)
