= James Martin Smith =

American community leader in Arizona (1892–1970)

James Martin Smith (December 12, 1892 – May 24, 1970) was an American civic, business, and religious leader in Arizona. The youngest Child of American frontiersman and Mormon Pioneer, Lot Smith, Smith was born in Tuba City, Arizona Territory, but spent most of his life in Central, Arizona. His mother name was Diantha Elizabeth Mortensen Smith, she was Lot Smith's 8th wife. James moved to Central after his father's death in a grazing conflict with Navajo Indians. He served in various county, state, and religious leadership positions, including Chairman of the Arizona State Highway Commission, Senator in the Arizona State Legislature, LDS Bishop of the Central Ward, and President of the St. Joseph Stake. He ran two unsuccessful Arizona gubernatorial campaigns in 1948 and 1950. He was a publisher of the Arizona Journal, a short lived statewide newspaper. He married Winnie Elizabeth Bigler in 1913 and was the father of nine children, eight sons and one daughter.
