= James Smith (New South Wales cricketer) =

Australian cricketer (1880–1958)

Personal information
- Born: 20 March 1880; Sydney, Australia
- Died: 18 June 1958 (aged 78); Sydney, Australia
- Source: ESPNcricinfo, 1 February 2017

James Smith (20 March 1880 – 18 June 1958) was an Australian cricketer. He played two first-class matches for New South Wales in 1909/10.

== See also ==
- List of New South Wales representative cricketers
