= James Cowan Smith =

British philanthropist

- Born: c. 1843
- Died: April 1919 (aged 75–76)
- Occupations: Engineer, philanthropist
- Known for: Philanthropy

James Cowan Smith (c. 1843 – April 1919) was a British civil engineer and philanthropist. He lived in Yorkshire and Nottinghamshire and was director of a railway company. In his last will and testament he left a bequest of more than £52,257 (over £2 million today) to the National Gallery of Scotland to be used to expand its collections. The fund has since purchased more than 40 works of art, produced by some of the world's most famous artists. An unusual condition of the bequest was that a portrait of his dog, a Dandie Dinmont terrier named Callum, was to be on permanent display at the gallery. The gallery has honoured this request ever since.

== Life ==
James Cowan Smith was born in 1843 and was the son of a shipowner from Banffshire, Scotland. Cowan Smith became a civil engineer and later moved to Yorkshire in England. He was living in Rotherham by 1871 and by 1887 was a director of the railway wagon leasing company British Wagon, and residing in the fashionable Moorgate Grove, Rotherham. Cowan Smith moved to Thrybergh by 1891 and lived there with his wife and two servants. His wife died before 1901.

Cowan Smith later moved to Nottinghamshire. He purchased land at Bothamsall from Henry Pelham-Clinton, 7th Duke of Newcastle on 3 September 1906 and built a house there, which he named Bothamsall Hall. Cowan Smith died in April 1919.

== Will ==
Cowan Smith's last will and testament was dated 26 May 1915. After his death his estate was valued at £55,524 11s 2d (£2,500,000 in 2025). Cowan Smith's will stated that the Society of Antiquaries of Scotland was to have free choice of any items from his estate for their collection. The society chose some of his English-made porcelain and silver plate, though did not touch his library, which was later sold. The porcelain was subsequently lent to the Royal Scottish Museum for display in its ceramics gallery.

The remainder of the estate, valued in excess of £55,000, was left to the National Gallery of Scotland with the interest accruing to be used to purchase works of art. The Cowan Smith bequest has been described as an important acquisition fund that helped to transform the museum. The fund has enabled the purchase of more than 40 works including those by Turner, Goya, Constable, Rubens, Charles Rennie Mackintosh, John Singer Sargent and Diego Velázquez.

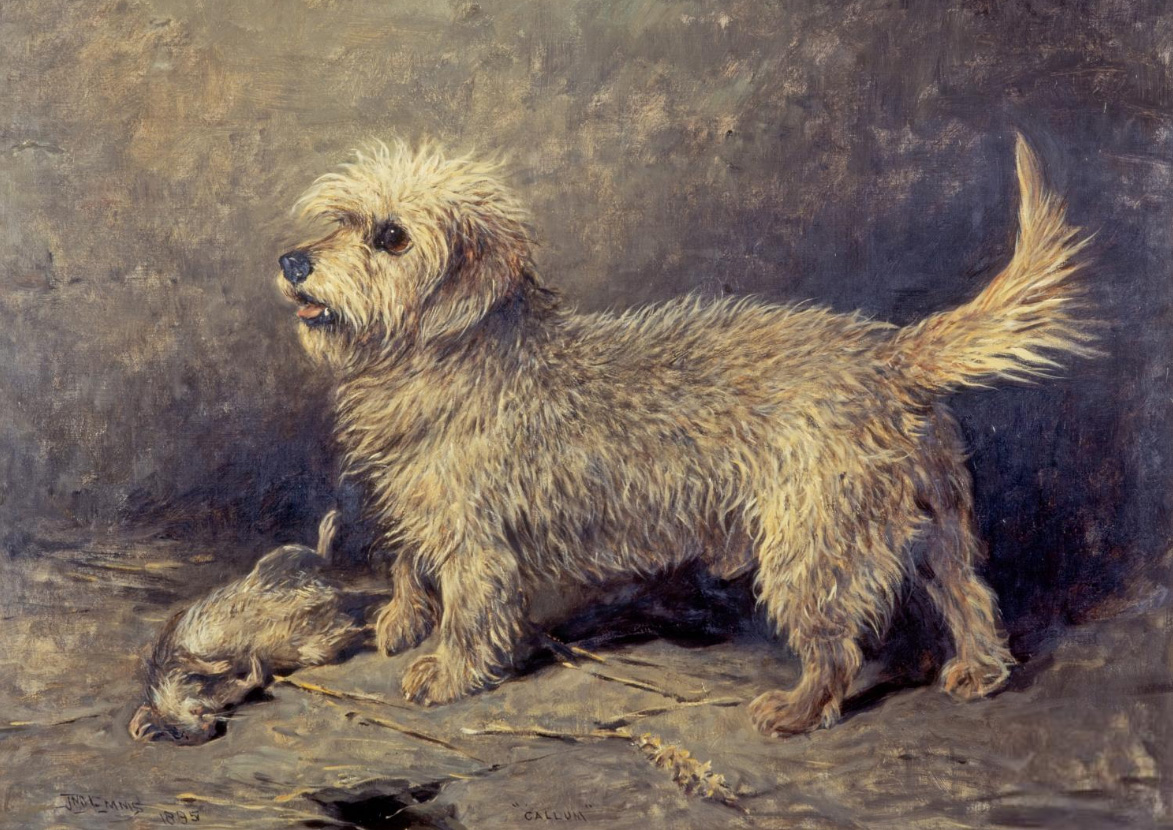
Callum by John Emms (1895)

The bequest had two conditions attached. The first was that his dog Fury, a Dandie Dinmont terrier, was to be looked after by the gallery for the rest of his life. The second was that a portrait of a previous (deceased) dog, Callum, by artist John Emms be on permanent display at the gallery.

=== Later fame ===
The portrait of Callum remains on display at the gallery, and the bequest has been the subject of at least one exhibition. Reproductions of the painting are sold in postcard and greetings card form by the gallery. The unusual conditions attached to the donation have helped to draw attention to the Dandie Dinmont, which is one of the rarest terrier breeds in the UK. A tweet by a gallery visitor commenting on the painting of Callum was described by The Scotsman as having gone viral in November 2018.

The Cowan Smith will was discussed in a Scottish Parliament bill committee looking at a proposed law to allow the Burrell Collection to loan out works of art, which was prohibited by the terms of William Burrell's will. Ben Thomson, chairman of the trustees of the National Galleries of Scotland told the committee

We have had other odd things such as the James Cowan Smith bequest, under the terms of which the gallery had to look after his dog when he died and have a picture of the dog hanging in the gallery at all times. The wealth that he left was such that it was worth taking on the bequest, and we still honour it.
