= James Thorneloe Smith =

Australian politician

The Hon James Smith

Member of the Queensland Legislative Council
- In office 23 August 1888 – 14 March 1902

Personal details
- Born: James Thorneloe Smith; 20 August 1825 Chester, England
- Died: 14 March 1902 (aged 76) Brisbane, Queensland, Australia
- Resting place: Helidon General Cemetery
- Spouse: Pauline Eliza Marks (m.1852)
- Occupation: Civil Engineer, Surveyor

James Thorneloe Smith M.Inst C.E., (20 August 1825 – 14 March 1902) was an engineer and politician in colonial Queensland, a member of the Queensland Legislative Council.

== Early life ==
Smith was the son of the Rev. William Smith, Wesleyan minister, was born in Chester and educated at Woodhouse Grove School, near Leeds.

== Engineering career ==
Smith arrived in Victoria (Australia) in 1852, and entered the Civil Service of that colony as a railway surveyor in the same year. Upon a reduction being made in the staff, he went to Queensland in November 1862, and after twelve months' exploration in the interior, entered the Queensland Civil Service and surveyed the upper portion of the main range above Murphys Creek. In 1865 Mr. Smith constructed the railway from Toowoomba to Warwick, Queensland and afterwards became chief engineering surveyor of the Railway Surveys Department, and surveyed Cooktown and the interior with a view to possible railway construction. In 1873 he was appointed by the Arthur Macalister Administration Chief Engineer of the South and West Railway system, and was Acting Chief Engineer for twelve months, during the absence of Mr. Stanley, who then held that post. He then acted as Deputy Engineer-in-chief of the South and West Railways until the abolition of the office by the Samuel Griffith Ministry in July 1884.

== Politics ==
Smith was appointed to the Queensland Legislative Council on 23 August 1888 and remained a member until his death.

== Personal life ==
Smith married Pauline Eliza Marks in Melbourne on 31 October 1852.

He died in Brisbane on 14 March 1902 following several months of poor health. As he had requested, he was buried at Helidon alongside his brother William Smith, following a graveside funeral service. His coffin was carried by train from Brisbane, where he was farewelled by railway officials to Helidon, where gangers who had worked under him on the Toowoomba railway carried his coffin to the cemetery.
