= James Smith (footballer, born 1908) =

English footballer (1908–1956)

Personal information
- Date of birth: 6 May 1908
- Place of birth: Thurnscoe, England
- Date of death: July 1956 (aged 48)
- Height: 5 ft 10 in (1.78 m)
- Position: Left back

Senior career*
Years	Team	Apps	(Gls)
- Brodsworth
1929–1931	Doncaster Rovers	20	(0)
1931–1936	Lincoln City	116	(3)
1936–1937	Bradford City	1	(0)
1937–1938	Peterborough United	27	(1)
- * Club domestic league appearances and goals

James Smith (6 May 1908 – July 1956) was an English footballer who made 137 appearances in the Football League playing for Doncaster Rovers, Lincoln City and Bradford City. He played at left back.

== Life and career ==
Smith was born in Thurnscoe, which was then in the West Riding of Yorkshire. He played football for local team Brodsworth before joining Doncaster Rovers of the Football League Third Division North. He made 20 league appearances before joining fellow Northern Section club Lincoln City ahead of the 1931–32 Football League season. Smith made his Lincoln debut in November 1931, and appeared regularly as they won the division title that season, to earn promotion to the Second Division. He stayed with the club for five years, and then joined Bradford City, for whom he made just one Second Division appearance. He left Bradford City in August 1937 and spent the 1937–38 season with Peterborough United in the Midland League.

Smith died in July 1956 at the age of 48.
