= J. Walter Smith =

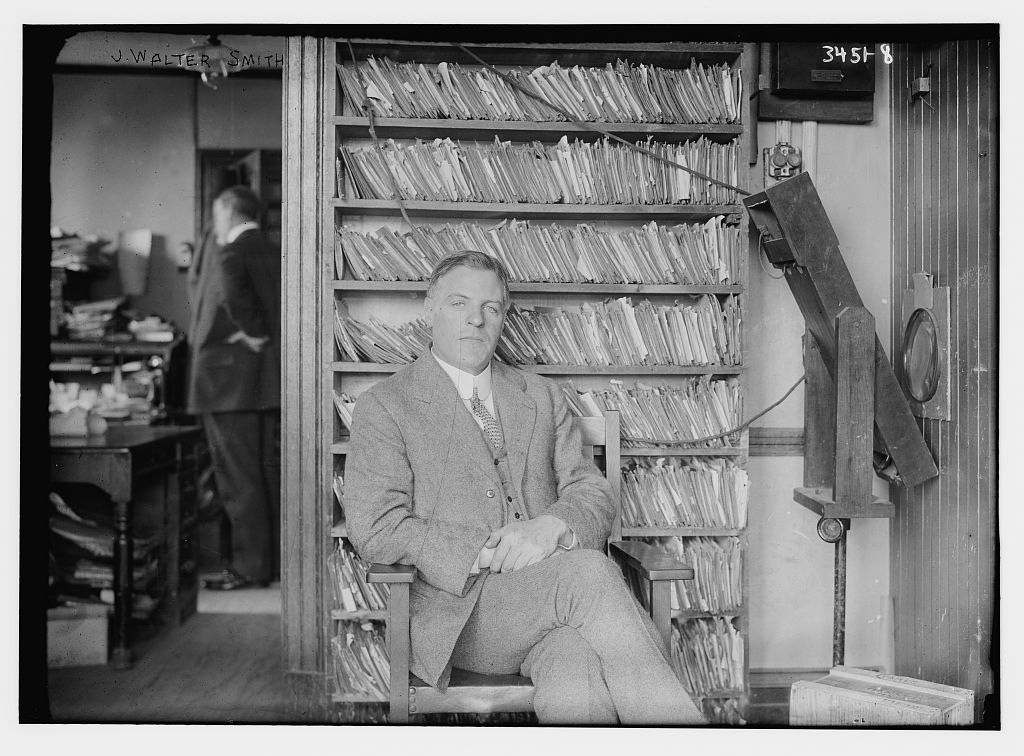
- Smith in 1916 at the Bain photo studio in Manhattan
- Born: 1869
- Died: August 25, 1931 (aged 62)

J. Walter Smith (1869 - August 25, 1931) was the editor of the American edition of The Strand Magazine.

== Biography ==
He was born in 1869. He was the publisher of the American edition of The Strand Magazine. He died on August 25, 1931, of "tuberculosis, complicated with diabetes" in Rutland, Massachusetts.
