= James Smith (anaesthetist) =

James Anstruther Smith FFARCS (1917 – 18 December 1986) was a Scottish consultant anaesthetist who was one of the pioneers of safe anaesthesia for cardiac catheterization in children.

== Education ==
James Anstruther Smith was educated at Strathallan School and St John's College, Cambridge where he was a noted swimmer and water polo player, captaining the team and swimming against the University of Oxford in 1938. He also accompanied the Footlights on the piano. In 1938 he went to the Medical College of St Bartholomew's Hospital in London, graduating in 1942.

== Career ==
Following his house appointments Smith became resident anaesthetist at St Bartholomew's. With most consultants on military duty he quickly became senior resident anaesthetist, which prevented him from joining the army for two years. In 1944 he attained the Diploma of Anaesthesia (DA) and joined the Royal Army Medical Corps. He served in India and ended his military career with the rank of major and consultant status.

In 1948 Smith was appointed as senior registrar in anaesthetics at the Royal Postgraduate Medical School at Hammersmith Hospital in London and later that year as lecturer and consultant. He published several original papers during his five years at the hospital. In March 1950 Smith published a paper entitled 'Anaesthesia for Cardiac Catheterization in Children'.

Smith was appointed consultant anaesthetist for the Plymouth hospitals group in 1953. He was the first coordinator of the anaesthetic department and established several courses for training operating department assistants in the south west. Smith was elected to the council of the Association of Anaesthetists of Great Britain and Ireland in 1962. He was also elected president of the Society of Anaesthetists of the South Western Region in 1973.

In 1981 he published another notable paper with P B Harvey entitled 'Prevention of air emboli in hip surgery. Femoral shaft insufflation with carbon dioxide.'
