= J. D. Smith =

J. D. Smith may refer to:

- J. D. Smith (fullback, born 1932), former American football fullback in the National Football League
- J. D. Smith (fullback, born 1936), former American football fullback
- J. D. Smith (offensive tackle) (born 1936), former American football offensive lineman in the National Football League
- JD Smith, pseudonym used by Josh Seefried as the founder of OutServe
- JD Smith, a member of Australian vocal group the Ten Tenors
