= James Smith (fitness influencer) =

Social media personality and author

- Education: Hartpury College
- Occupations: Social media influencer, personal trainer, author
- Years active: 2015 – present

James Smith is an author, personal trainer and social media influencer best known for posting fitness advice videos across various platforms. He has a following of 1.7 million users on TikTok and one million on Instagram. Smith has struggled with body image issues and briefly used anabolic steroids before ceasing after experiencing negative side effects and concerns about his future health. Smith is the author of three books. His first book, Not a Diet Book, became a best-seller, reaching first place in the Amazon, Audible and Apple eBook charts.

== Background ==
Originally from Winkfield, Smith moved to Sydney, Australia, in 2016. Smith operates an online personal training business named "James Smith Academy," which creates online training plans for users. Smith was at one point enrolled at Hartpury College; however, he was asked to leave the institution after he failed to attend classes.

== Personal life ==
Smith is an avid practitioner of Brazilian jiu-jitsu and was promoted to black belt in the martial art in November 2026. He is also an active competitor and earned a bronze medal in the under 100 kg advanced division of the ADCC Sydney Open on April 21, 2024.

== Works ==
- Smith, James (2020). Not a Diet Book. HarperCollins. ISBN 9780008374297.
- Smith, James (2020). Not a Life Coach. HarperCollins. ISBN 9780008404826.
- Smith, James (2022). How To Be Confident. HarperCollins. ISBN 9780008536459.
