= Edward J. Smith (American politician) =

American politician

Member of the Rhode Island House of Representatives from the 92 district
- In office 1980–1994

Personal details
- Born: May 1927 New Haven, CT
- Died: September 2010 (aged 83)
- Party: Democratic
- Spouse: Dorothy Smith (1932–2000)
- Profession: Retired Navy, Manufacturer

Edward Smith (May 1927 – September 2010) was a member of the Rhode Island House of Representatives from 1980 to 1994, representing District 92 in Tiverton. He served as Chairman of the RI Coastal Resources Management Council, Vice Chairman of Narragansett Bay Commission and Chairman of the R.I. Joint Legislative Committee on Environment and Energy.

A 30 year veteran of the U.S. Navy, Smith was one of a relatively small group of men to serve in combat positions in World War II, the Korean War and the Vietnam War. He was prime recovery officer for John Glenn and NASA’s 6 Friendship 7 capsule.

== References and links ==
- RI General Election Results 1990
- RI General Election Results 1992
- Resolution Honoring Former State Representative Edward J. Smith
