= James A. Smith (mayor) =

American politician

James A. Smith was the first mayor of Ridgefield, Washington, which incorporated in 1909.
