= James Smith (Kansas politician) =

American politician

James Smith served as Secretary of State of Kansas from 1879 to 1885. He graduated from Jefferson College in Canonsburg, Pennsylvania in 1857. He was a Republican.
