= Smitty the Jumper =

American skydiver (1898–1995)

H. Truesdell Smith—known variously as "H. T. Smith", "Henry Truesdell Smith", "Harold Truesdell Smith", or "Daredevil Smitty" but best known as "Smitty the Jumper"—was an American exhibition parachutist and skydiver of the 1920s and 1930s. He made periodic returns to skydiving starting in the late 1950s, jumping in every subsequent decade until his death, becoming widely known as "the oldest living skydiver", a title he claimed until his death in 1995 at the age of 96.

== Early life ==
Smitty was born in Salisbury, North Carolina, on October 17, 1898. He grew up in the shadow of emerging aviation and began to develop a desire to parachute. However, the early 20th century in aviation was an era when many jumpers, in primitive gear, often did not survive their first attempt; however, Smitty vowed he would.

== Aviation career ==
=== Exhibition parachute jumping ===
From age 18 to age 30, Smith tried time and again to get someone to take him aloft for his first jump. Pilots, upon learning of his inexperience, continually denied him the opportunity.

In 1928, at age 30—with a home-made parachute crafted from (by varying accounts) "cheap silk" or "cotton" or from J.C. Penney bedsheets—Smitty leaped from a plane piloted by Andy Burke, near Wichita Falls, Texas, and parachuted safely to earth—the first of over 200 jumps to come, including an airshow career, two revivals of his jumping career, and ultimately national fame in when aging into his 80s and 90s.

Within days of his first jump, Smitty was jumping again, for an audience, collecting pay for the effort. While his original career was as a sign-painter, he soon began finding money in exhibition parachuting. Borrowing gear from others until 1934, he eventually was given an old parachute, with hemp lines, and fashioned additional rigging and harness for it from leather and a Ford Model A (some say "Model T") steering wheel.

PHOTO: For a photo of Smitty in jumping gear, in the 1920s (from the Burrell Tibbs papers at the University of Texas at Dallas), click here. For enlarged version of the photo, click here.

For another decade, Smitty would continue jumping in barnstorming exhibitions—particularly in Kansas, Oklahoma, Texas and Arkansas. His stunts included multiple-chute jumps (releasing himself from a parachute, falling, then opening another 'chute just before hitting the ground), wing-walking, and leaps from a moving automobile to an airplane. Many of Smitty's jumps were done with borrowed equipment, usually without a reserve chute. Discovering that payment was higher, the lower he opened his 'chute, he earned the nickname "Tree-Top Smitty."

In 1933, during a county fair, he set a his personal solo parachute jump altitude record of 11,000 feet, over Bentonville, Arkansas.

By 1937, approximately age 40, after 204-205 jumps, Smitty's second wife—raising three children with him—persuaded him to give up jumping, and return to more profitable work as a sign-painter. His work ranged from multi-story signs painted on large buildings to painting nose art on aircraft—including the name and bird emblem on TV-hero Sky King's airplane Songbird.

Early in his life, he also became a dance instructor, later noting he'd been teaching dancing since the 1920s.

=== Return to jumping ===
However, in the late 1950s, nearing age 60, Smitty returned to the airshow circuit. His elderly jumping career was spotted with accidents and near-death experiences that, nevertheless, failed to kill him:

- In 1960 (age 61), piloted by Wichita professional pilot U.L."Rip" Gooch, he made jumps at the National Airshow In Wichita, Kansas, opening his chute at the low altitude of 1500 feet. One jump, however, nearly cost him his life as he blacked out on exiting the plane—waking up just in time to open the chute at treetop level.
- In 1972 (age 73–74, one account says "76"), he suffered a broken leg in jump near Maize, Kansas, just west of Wichita, attempting to land near a group of "girls", who wound up carrying him back to the drop zone. With ice packs on his broken leg, he remained there, partying into the night, waiting until the next day to go to the hospital.
- In August 1974 (age 75), in Lincoln, Nebraska, jumping for the 211th time, he momentarily blacked out, again, and awoke just in time to see he was falling into a pit of black water at the city dump. Maneuvering quickly, he avoided the water, but struck an embankment, breaking leg, hip, and pelvis (some accounts say both legs). However, it was believed that that jump made Smith the oldest person ever to parachute.

The Lincoln-dump jump ended his solo jumping career, with Smitty hospitalized in a body cast for over two and a half months. That didn't end Smitty's energy or notoriety, though. In 1980, at age 81, American TV host Johnny Carson invited him to appear the NBC-TV Tonight Show, billed as "The World's Oldest Skydiver." For his 82nd birthday, he chose to "boogie" at a banquet-and-dance.

=== Jumping with help ===
Though no longer willing to subject his body to the risks of solo jumping, Smitty's career took a rebound with the 1982 development of the "tandem-jump" harness—a device which allows one skydiver to attach their harness to the back of another skydiver's harness, so that an able skydiver can assist the jump of a less-qualified or less able-bodied skydiver, under one very big parachute.

In 1985 (age 87), near El Dorado, Kansas, Smitty attached master skydiver Mark McCafferty to his back, and the two jumped together successfully.

In late summer 1985 (at age 87), at the world's largest airshow and fly-in, EAA AirVenture, in Oshkosh, Wisconsin, Smitty made his assisted 214th jump before a crowd estimated at 200,000.

On December 15, 1985 (age 88), Smitty made his 216th parachute jump at Perris Valley, California, extending a record that he had set two years before, when claiming the title "World's Oldest Sky Diver". The jump also set a world record for the oldest father-son skydiving team, with Smitty's son, Wichita businessman Jerry Smith (age 54 / 56), who had only jumped for the first time the day before. Members of the United States' world champion sky diving team had organized the event to honor Smith for being the world's oldest active parachutist.

Also at Perris Valley, with Don Balch (Perris Valley Sky Diving Society), Smitty made a tandem jump from 13,000 feet, and during their 8,000-foot free-fall, Smitty and Balch, with seven other skydivers from the Coors World Champion Sky Diving Team, joined arms to form an eight-sided, falling star formation, before breaking apart, opening their parachutes, and landing on target.

Over a five-year period, Smitty made 15 tandem jumps.

On July 5, 1990 (age 91), in Albert Lea, Minnesota, Smitty made his 221st and final jump — another tandem jump — declaring he'd better quit while "still in one piece".

== Social and post-career life ==
Smitty's wife Charlotte, who had grown up in Pea Ridge, Arkansas, met him when she was working at a cigar stand in Bella Vista, Arkansas, where he performed frequently in the 1930s. They had three children.

Smitty was a cult figure in skydiving circles, a celebrity at gatherings of parachutists, particularly the U.S. National Parachuting Championships, where the "outgoing and gregarious" Smitty often served as "unofficial greeter." Known for enthusiastic (and well-received) flirtations with much younger women, he once got a kiss from the reigning Miss Universe.

He was a long-time resident of the "Air Capital City," Wichita, Kansas (home also to son Jerry), in later life, Smitty lived in a trailer decorated as a museum of his career, filled with skydiving memorabilia. Among these was the body cast from his ill-fated jump in Lincoln, labeled with a sign: "Warning to all jumpers - quit before the age of 76."

At the end of his life—the last few years spent in a Wichita nursing home—he reportedly only expressed one regret: the ill-fated crash-landing in the Lincoln dump, which ended his solo skydiving career at 75. At age 96, Smitty died on June 7, 1995, at his nursing home in Wichita. At his funeral, as he had hoped, he was laid to rest in his jumpsuit as a group of planes flew overhead, and a flock of skydivers parachuted from the planes to his graveside, one trailing the American flag.

== See also ==
- Barnstorming
- Parachute
- Parachuting
- Skydiving
- Tandem skydiving
