= James Smith (moderator) =

Church of Scotland clergyman

James Smith (1803–1897) was a minister of the Church of Scotland, who served as Moderator of the General Assembly in 1881.

== Life ==
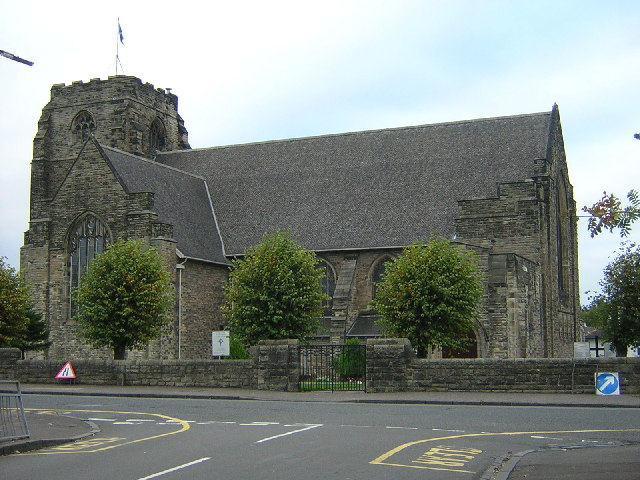
Old Cathcart Parish Church

He was born on 17 November 1803 in Paisley the son of James Smith minister of Paisley Abbey. He was educated at Paisley Grammar School and studied at Glasgow University. He was licensed to preach by the Presbytery of Glasgow in June 1827.

In August 1827, under patronage of John Gordon of Aikenhead, to the congregation of Cathcart and was ordained as minister there in February 1828. He spent his entire career there, 69 years in the post. In 1852 Glasgow University awarded him an honorary Doctor of Divinity.

In 1843 he became Presbytery Clerk to the General Assembly and from 1853 was Synod Clerk. In 1881 he succeeded Archibald Watson as Moderator of the General Assembly of the Church of Scotland the highest position in the Scottish Church. He was succeeded by William Milligan.

For the final two years of his ministry (from age 91) he was assisted by Gavin Scott Wotherspoon. Smith died Father of the Church on 6 March 1897 aged 93.

== Family ==
In April 1830 he married Eliza Hamilton (died 1871) daughter of Robert Hamilton of Ashfield, Stoke. They had five daughters and one son.

== Publications ==
- Account on the Parish of Cathcart (1845)
