= Smitty Duke =

American volleyball player (1942–2010)

Medal record

Men's volleyball

Representing the United States

Pan American Games
Gold medal – first place	1967 Winnipeg	Team
Silver medal – second place	1971 Cali	Team

Horrace Smith "Smitty" Duke (June 12, 1942 – September 18, 2010) was an American volleyball player who competed in the 1968 Summer Olympics. He was born in Center, Texas and died in Unicoi, Tennessee.
