= James Charles Smith =

American engineer

James Charles Smith from the Utility Wind Integration Group, Kitty Hawk, North Carolina was named Fellow of the Institute of Electrical and Electronics Engineers (IEEE) in 2013 for leadership in integration of wind energy sources into the electric power grid.
