= James Smith (New Zealand cricketer) =

New Zealand cricketer (1891–1971)

Personal information
- Full name: James Mowat Smith
- Born: 28 January 1891; Dunedin, Otago, New Zealand
- Died: 7 September 1971 (aged 80); Auckland, New Zealand

Domestic team information
- Years: Team
- 1914/15–1921/22: Otago
- Source: CricInfo, 24 May 2016

James Mowat Smith (28 January 1891 – 7 September 1971) was a New Zealand cricketer. He played six first-class matches for Otago between 1914–15 and 1921–22.

Smith was born at Dunedin in 1891 and educated at Otago Boys' High School in the city. He made his first-class debut against Southland in February 1915 before serving in the New Zealand Army during World War I. He had worked as a clerk before enlisting in December 1915, serving with the New Zealand Field Artillery in Europe throughout much of the remainder of the war, He was promoted to the rank of sergeant in 1916 and, after serving on the Western Front during 1918, to Regimental Sergeant Major. He was in training to become an officer at the end of the war.

After returning to New Zealand, Smith played three times for Otago during the 1919–20 season before making his final two first-class appearances for the representative side during 1921–22. In is six matches he scored a total of 45 runs with a highest score of 12. He died at Auckland in 1971 at the age of 80.
