= James Tuttle Smith =

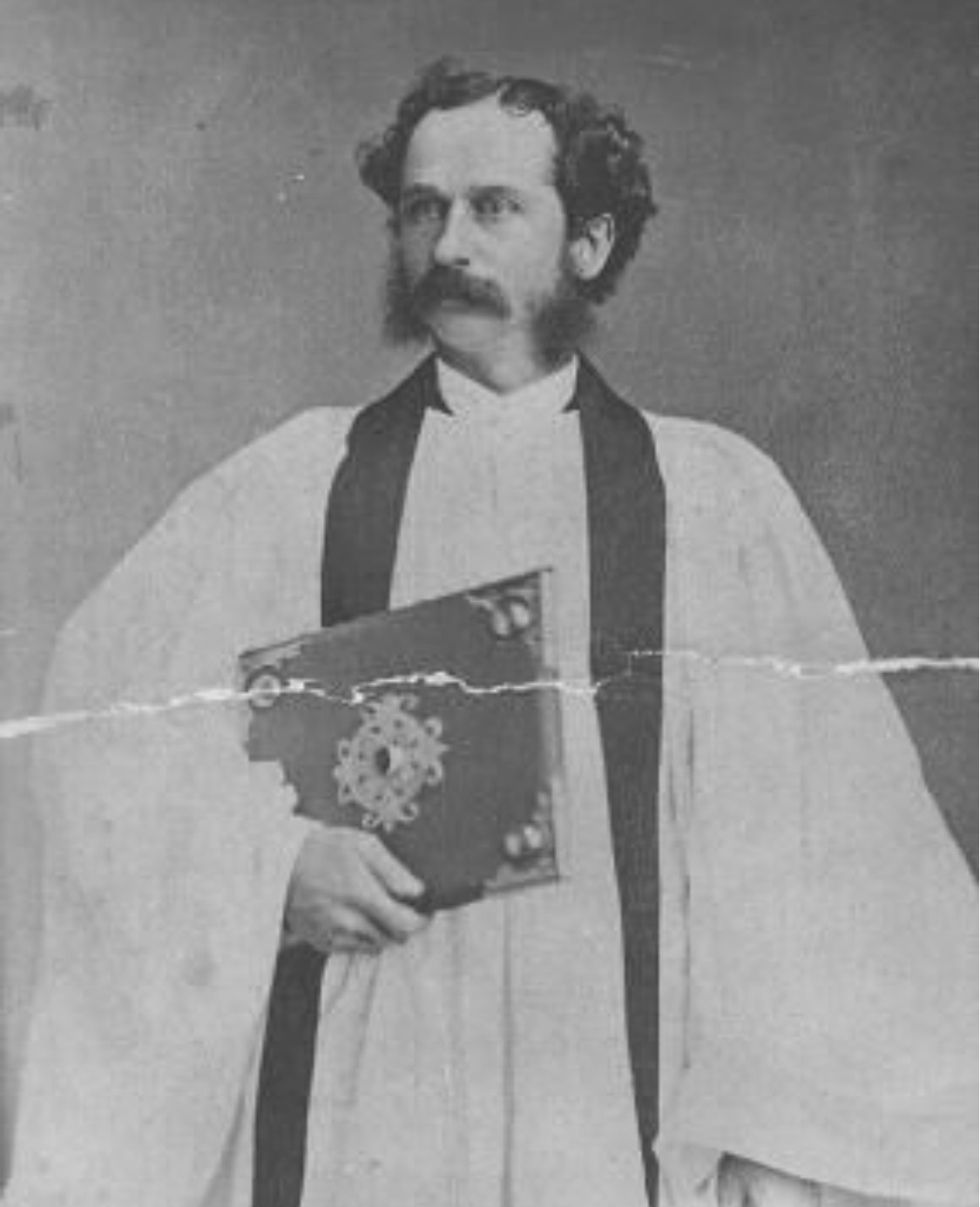
Smith circa 1870-1880

James Tuttle Smith, D.D. (July 6, 1831 – December 18, 1910) was rector of the Church of the Resurrection in Manhattan from 1866 to 1888, then known as the Church of the Holy Sepulchre.

== Biography ==
He was born on July 6, 1831, in New York City to Sarah Street (1794–1884) and Benjamin Smith (1782–1836). His mother was the daughter of Caleb Street (1753–1797).

He served as a Military chaplain during the United States Civil War from 1862 to 1865. He graduated from Columbia College, Columbia University in 1865 with a Master of Arts degree.

He was rector of the Church of the Resurrection in Manhattan from 1866 to 1888.

On November 5, 1867, he married Frances Isabella Manice, the daughter of Deforest Manice.

He died on December 18, 1910, in Oatland, Ridgefield, Connecticut. He was buried in Lounsbury Cemetery in Ridgefield, Connecticut.

== Memberships ==
- Saint Nicholas Society of the City of New York, Royal Arch Mason, Order of Bolivar, and Union League Club of New York.
