= John A. Smith =

John A. Smith may refer to:

- John Abel Smith (1802–1871), British Member of Parliament
- John Alexander Smith (1863–1939), British philosopher
- John Ambler Smith (1847–1892), American politician from Virginia
- John Armstrong Smith (1814–1892), American politician from Ohio
- John A. Smith (Mississippi politician) (1847–1910), American state senator in Mississippi

== See also ==
- John Smith (disambiguation)
