= James Smith (archdeacon of Connor) =

Anglican priest in Ireland, Archdeacon of Connor

James Smith (7 October 1800—25 February 1865) was an Anglican priest in Ireland during the 19th century. Creery was born in County Mayo and educated at Trinity College, Dublin. He was Archdeacon of Connor from 1849 until his death.
