= James L. Smith (Missouri politician) =

American politician

Member of the U.S. House of Representatives from Missouri's 46th district

Missouri House of Representatives
- In office 1975–1985

Personal details
- Born: 1917 Marshall, Missouri, US
- Died: 2000 (aged 82–83)
- Resting place: Ridge Park Cemetery in Saline County, Missouri
- Party: Democratic
- Spouse: Mildred Heynen
- Children: 2 (1 son, 1 daughter)
- Occupation: farmer, restaurant operator, salesman

James L. Smith (March 28, 1917 - December 24, 2000) was a Democratic politician who served in the Missouri House of Representatives.

== Biography ==
Smith was born in Marshall, Missouri, and was educated in Marshall public schools and attended Missouri Valley College in Marshall, Missouri. On August 16, 1942, he married Mildred Heynen in Elkton, Maryland. He was a veteran of the United States Army Air Forces and served during World War II.
