= James E. Smith (engineer) =

James E. Smith is a computer engineer and an emeritus professor at the University of Wisconsin–Madison.

Smith was awarded the 1999 Eckert–Mauchly Award "for fundamental contributions to high performance micro-architecture, including saturating counters for branch prediction, reorder buffers for precise exceptions, decoupled access/execute architectures, and vector supercomputer organization memory, and interconnects."

Smith earned his BS in computer engineering and his MS and PhD in computer science from the University of Illinois in 1972, 1974, and 1976 respectively. He joined Wisconsin's ECE faculty in 1976 and took leaves of absence to work in industry between 1979 -'81 and 1984-'89.
