= J. T. Smith =

J.T. Smith may refer to:

- J. T. Smith (wrestler) (born 1967), American retired professional wrestler
- J. T. Smith (American football) (born 1955), former American football player
- J. T. Smith (musician) (fl. 1920s–1930s), American blues musician
- J.T. Smith (sprinter) (born 1998), American sprinter
- LL Cool J, born 1968, James Todd Smith
