= James Carmichael Smith (postmaster) =

- Born: 1852; Bahamas
- Died: 1919 (aged 66–67); London, England

James Carmichael Smith (1852 - 1919) was a colonial civil servant in the Bahamas and Sierra Leone, founder of the Freeman newspaper, and a member of the Bahamas' Legislative Assembly.

== Early life and family ==
James Carmichael Smith was born in the Bahamas in 1852, the son of an Englishman from Yorkshire and a black Bahamian mother. He was named after the governor of the Bahamas, James Carmichael Smyth. He attended both Boys Central School and Nassau Grammar School and spent almost 5 years at sea.

== Career ==
=== Bahamas ===
Smith began his service as the chief clerk and storekeeper of the imperial treasury and commissariat department from June 1876 to August 1889. He served as a member of the board of education from 1886 to 1902.

He served as postmaster in the Bahamas from 1889-1896. He served in the Legislative Assembly from 1882-1896 representing the Western District of New Providence.

=== Sierra Leone ===
In 1896, he was appointed Assistant Postmaster of Sierra Leone, making him very likely one of a small number of people of colour serving in the British Colonial Service. He became the acting curator of institutes from January 1899 to January 1900. In 1900, Smith was appointed postmaster-general and manager of the government savings bank. In addition, he took on the role of acting collector of customs from October 1902 to April 1903 and served as acting colonial treasurer in 1906. He served as postmaster general until 1909, cementing his long career in colonial administration.

== Social views ==
In 1887, Smith founded the pro-black, anti-establishment Bahamian newspaper, the Freeman.

He was a market socialist and egalitarian who published numerous books and writings promoting these views during the late 19th and early 20th centuries.

=== Pan African views ===
He was a Pan Africanist and a strong defender of Black people, made evident in the lengthy exchange he had with the Englishman John Gardiner in 1886 after the latter referred to Black Bahamians as "lazy and good for nothing". He also supported Caribbean integration, promoting the idea of federating the West Indies and charting their own path to prosperity. He was a strong supporter of the Empire but believed in the Self Governance of the British West Indies as a federal province within the Empire.

James Carmichael Smith was among the earliest Bahamians to express Pan African views. In a speech, he gave on 1 August 1887, he focused on the importance of Africa as a central point in which all Black people should unify in the cause of its development: "let us endeavour to become more and more united, and let the children of Africa throughout the Western Hemisphere remember Fatherland or Motherland, let them remember Africa". Continuing this idea he said: "Let us use Africa as the unifying point, and attempt to organize the League of Africa, which should aim to include every human being having a drop of African blood in his veins of which he is not ashamed". He continues: "a league which, after inheriting the blessings of the latest civilization, would undertake the task of carrying or sending those blessings to the people of Africa by the hands of her own children; which would endeavour to teach the unenlightened people of Africa all the arts and manners of civilization, and so fit them to become citizens of free and independent nationalities. This is the special, the high duty of the enlightened children of Africa."

=== Views on Caribbean integration ===
Smith was among the earliest in the Caribbean to express Afro-Caribbean leftism. In 1892, he published The Distribution Of The Produce, a book that criticized the wage competitive system and promoted a wage co-operative system through profit-sharing. He believed the former gave power to one class of people over the other and argued that civilization should be moving in the direction of equality. He published more works in the early 1900s promoting market socialism: "Money and profit-sharing; or, The double standard money system" in 1908 and "Abundance and hard times" in 1908, just to name a few. His views were Egalitarian and predate similar views held by the Trinidadian, C. L. R. James.

== Later life and death ==
Smith married in 1893 and he and his wife had a daughter.

In 1914, Smith retired to Jersey from Sierra Leone. He subsequently moved to London, where he died in 1919.

== Selected publications ==
- Distribution of the Produce, 1892.
- Money and profit-sharing; or, The double standard money system, 1908
- Abundance and hard times, 1908
- Economic Reconstruction. A paper read at the Royal Colonial Institute on 15th June, 1916. P. S. King & Son, London, 1918.
