= John Henry Smith (reporter) =

John Henry Smith was an anchor and reporter for News 12 Long Island.

== Early life ==
Smith was born in San Francisco and raised in Detroit, MI. After graduating from Detroit Country Day School in 1985, John gained an appointment to the United States Naval Academy in Annapolis, Md. While there, John was a member of the boxing team. After a year in Annapolis, John transferred to Morehouse College in Atlanta, Georgia. He graduated cum laude from Morehouse in 1990.

== Career ==
John Henry Smith joined Al Jazeera America in July 2013 after 2 years at Comcast Sports Net Bay Area in San Francisco, CA. While at CSN, John served for a year as the sideline reporter for the Golden State Warriors. From 2009 to 2011, he served as the sports director and anchor/reporter at WVUE (FOX), in New Orleans. During his time at WVUE, Smith covered the New Orleans Saints' journey to Super Bowl XLIV. Before relocating to New Orleans, Smith was an anchor/reporter in Miami at WPLG (ABC), from 2004 to 2009. He also co-anchored Sports Sunday, a top-ranked sports wrap-up program in South Florida, as well as Sports Saturday, a college football wrap-up program. He as of June 4, 2016 is with News 12 Long Island as an anchor. Prior to his time in Florida, Smith was a sports anchor/reporter for News 14 Carolina, in Raleigh, NC, from 2002 to 2004.

== Awards ==
The Louisiana Associated Press Broadcasters Association awarded Smith's sportscast the best in New Orleans, in 2010.

== Education ==
Smith received his B.A. from Morehouse College in Atlanta, and his M.A. from Syracuse University in New York. John Henry also has an M.B.A from the University of Rochester and a Certificate in Film from New York University
