= James Smith (sports media figure) =

Sports and media figure (born 1959)

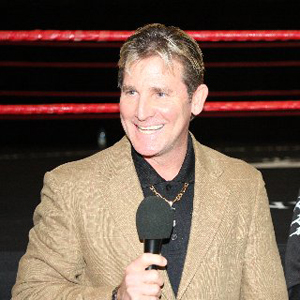
- Smitty during an interview
- Born: James E. Smith; February 5, 1959 (age 67); Miami, Florida, United States
- Other name: Smitty

James E. Smith (born February 5, 1959), also referred to as "Smitty", is a sports and media figure best known for his interviews with famous international boxing stars. Smith was a professional boxer for three years and has played football for University of Minnesota Tech. He is the host of In This Corner, America's only syndicated, half-hour-long boxing interview TV show, featuring interviews and in-ring demonstrations with professional boxers. Smith also has a regular commentary section on Secondsout.com, a leading boxing news website. Smith currently resides in Las Vegas, Nevada, and has three children.

== Personal life ==
Smith was born on February 5, 1959, in Miami, Florida, to Louise and James Smith Sr. He met boxing legend, Muhammad Ali, in 1970 when he was just 11 years old. Smith would often visit Ali at the 5th Street Gym on Miami Beach where he would frequently train. Smith played football for Carol City High School and later, University of Minnesota Tech, where he started as a wide receiver for two years. He was also a ball boy for the Miami Dolphins in 1970–1973.

== Career ==
In 1980, Smith decided to pursue a career in boxing, but that decision was short-lived. He quit boxing just three years later and soon started sports directing, talk hosting, broadcasting and even commentating for various television stations for the next forty years.

On May 23, 1997, Smith gave the play-by-play commentary of the first ever live internet boxing broadcast.

On April 1, 2004, Smith began hosting In This Corner. He has not only had famous boxers on the show, but well-known actors also.

Inducted into the Florida Boxing Hall of Fame, Class of 2010.

Inducted into the Nevada Boxing Hall of Fame in 2016

Hilton Grand Vacations time share host in Las Vegas & Current Host and MC of International Boxing Hall of Fame weekend Induction Ceremonies
