= James John Smith =

Mathematician

James John Smith (24 June 1892 – October 1983) was an Irish applied mathematician and electrical engineer. His career was mostly spent at General Electric (GE) in Schenectady, New York.

== Biography ==
Smith was born on 24 June 1892 in Clonmel. His father Christopher Smith was an inspector of schools, so the family moved a lot, and James grew up in part in Cork city. He earned a diploma in engineering from the Royal College of Science in Dublin, and then two master's from University College Dublin (UCD), first in maths (1913) and then in maths physics and experimental physics (1914). After a brief period at Siemens Brothers Dynamo Works in Stafford, England, he relocated to the United States, and started work at General Electric in Schenectady. In 1919, he earned another master's, this time in electrical engineering, from Union College nearby, and spend the period 1920-1923 teaching there, while earning his PhD (awarded 1923). The rest of his career was spent at GE.

He published mathematical papers on and off for several decades, and spoke twice at the International Congress of Mathematics (ICM). He was an Invited Speaker of the ICM in 1928 at Bologna, Italy with the talk Heaviside's operators and contour integrals and in 1932 at Zürich with the talk An expression of Green's function in generalized coordinates.

== Selected publications ==
- "The solution of differential equations by a method similar to Heaviside's." Journal of the Franklin Institute 195, no. 6 (1923): 815–850.
- "An analogy between pure mathematics and the operational mathematics of Heaviside by means of the theory of H-functions." Journal of the Franklin Institute 200, no. 5 (1925): 635–672. doi:10.1016/S0016-0032(25)90721-1
- "Telephone Interference from AC. Generators Feeding Directly on Line with Neutral Grounded." Transactions of the American Institute of Electrical Engineers 49, no. 2 (1930): 798–805. doi:10.1109/T-AIEE.1930.5055576
- with H. D. Brown: "Current and voltage wave shape of mercury arc rectifiers." Transactions of the American Institute of Electrical Engineers 52, no. 4 (1933): 973–984. doi:10.1109/T-AIEE.1933.5056433
- "How to say “no” in mathematics." Journal of the Franklin Institute 240, no. 2 (1945): 113–122. doi:10.1016/0016-0032(45)90245-6
- with P. L. Alger: "A derivation of Heaviside's operational calculus based on the generalized functions of Schwartz." Transactions of the American Institute of Electrical Engineers 68, no. 2 (1949): 939–946. doi:10.1109/T-AIEE.1949.5060031
- with P. L. Alger: "Justification of Heaviside methods." Electrical Engineering 69, no. 2 (1950): 116–116. doi:10.1109/EE.1950.6434136
- "Tables of Green's Functions, Fourier Series, and Impulse Functions for Rectangular Co-oradinate Systems." Transactions of the American Institute of Electrical Engineers 70, no. 1 (1951): 22–30. doi:10.1109/T-AIEE.1951.5060367
- with P. L. Alger: "Finite representation of impulse functions: In solving differential equations." Electrical Engineering 70, no. 2 (1951): 143–143. doi:10.1109/EE.1951.6437272
- with P. L. Alger: "The use of the null-unit function in generalized integration." Journal of the Franklin Institute 253, no. 3 (1952): 235–250. doi:10.1016/0016-0032(52)90502-4
- "A method of solving Mathieu's equation." Transactions of the American Institute of Electrical Engineers, Part I: Communication and Electronics 74, no. 4 (1955): 520–525. doi:10.1109/TCE.1955.6372408

== Patents ==
- "Harmonic suppression means for space discharge apparatus circuits." U.S. Patent 2,008,519, issued July 16, 1935.
