= Jail Hill Historic District =

Historic district in Connecticut, United States

- U.S. National Register of Historic Places
- U.S. Historic district
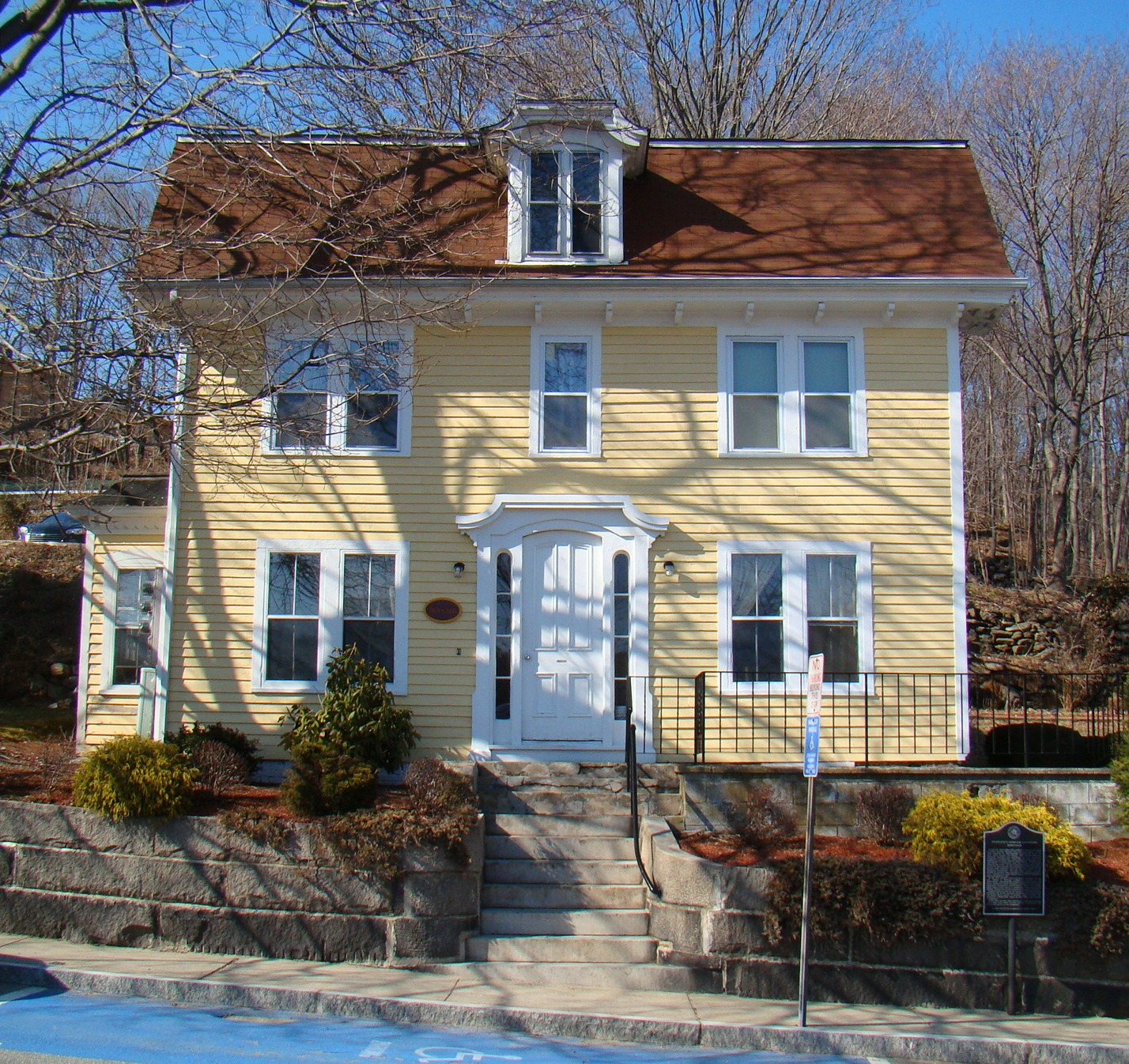
- Guy Druck House

- Location within Connecticut Location within the United States
- Location: Roughly along Cedar, School, Fountain, Happy, and John Streets, Norwich, Connecticut
- Coordinates: 41°31′38″N 72°4′47″W
- Area: 37 acres (15 ha)
- Architectural style: Greek Revival, Italian Villa, et al.
- NRHP reference No.: 99000431
- Added to NRHP: April 19, 1999

The Jail Hill Historic District encompasses a 19th-century working-class residential district in Norwich, Connecticut. Located on a steep hill overlooking downtown Norwich, it was populated first by African Americans, and then by Irish immigrants. Some early African-American residents played significant roles in bringing expanded rights and education to others. The district was added to the National Register of Historic Places on April 19, 1999.

== Description and history ==
Jail Hill takes its name from a jail built in 1834, which stood between Fountain and Cedar Streets, overlooking the city's downtown area. The hill rises more than 100 feet (30 m) above the downtown, at times forming steep cliff faces. The district includes all or part of School, John, Fountain, Cedar, Happy, and Old Division Streets. It encompasses a working-class residential area whose development began in the 1830s and was largely complete by 1865. Houses are of modest size and scale, and are typically vernacular interpretations of Greek Revival and Italianate styling, although later styles such as Queen Anne are also present.

Unlike many other early cities, Norwich's wealthy did not build on the highest ground above its developing downtown core. The Jail Hill area consequently became one where marginalized elements of society settled instead. The earliest settlers were free people of color from the Williams and Harris families, who purchased land here beginning in the 1830s. The Harrises were notably involved in the controversy surrounding the Prudence Crandall School in Canterbury: a Harris daughter was enrolled in the Crandall school, which was at the time otherwise exclusively white, and it was local community resistance to this enrollment that prompted Crandall to establish a school for African-American girls. The Harrises and Williamses were also active in abolitionist movements, and some of them went south after the American Civil War to establish schools for the education of emancipated slaves.

In the 1850s, the area gradually transformed into one dominated by Irish immigrants, many of whom were fleeing the Great Famine. They sought work in Norwich's textile mills, positions which were generally denied to the African Americans. The area was able to maintain a cohesive and tightly knit neighborhood due in part to the limitations of the geography.

== Gallery ==
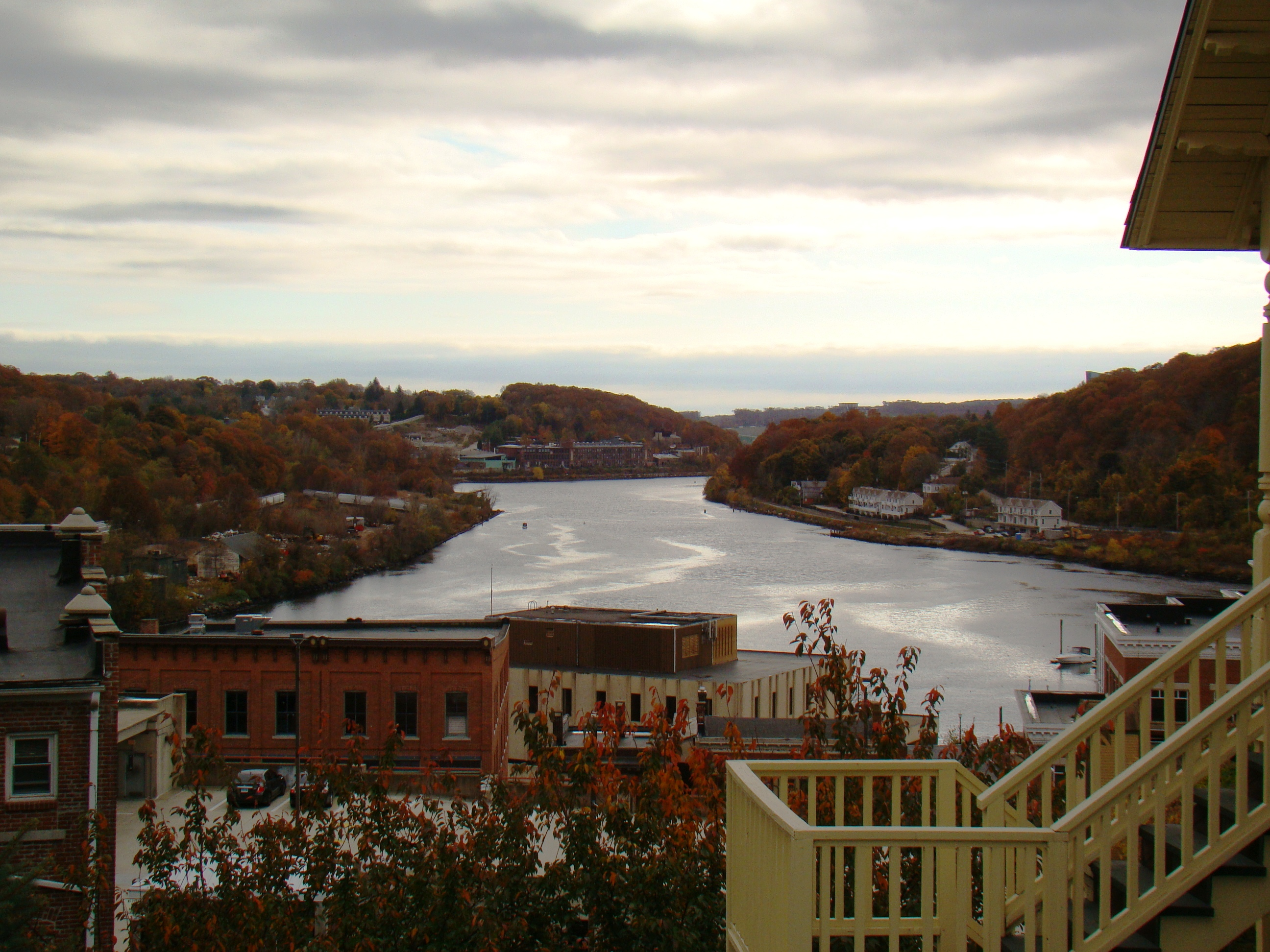
Residents of Jail Hill could easily monitor ships arriving on the Thames.

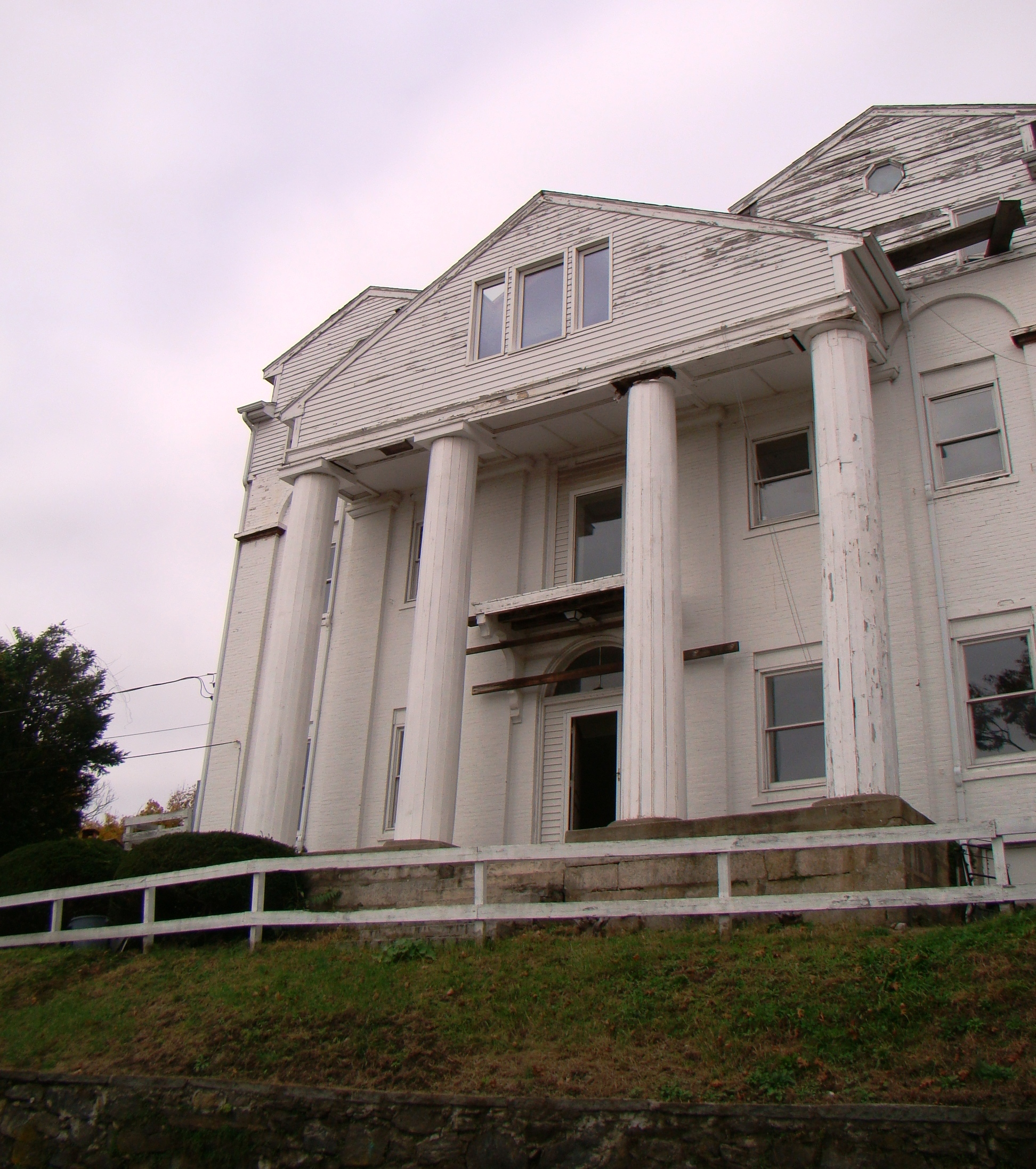
Jail Hill institutional building on School St.

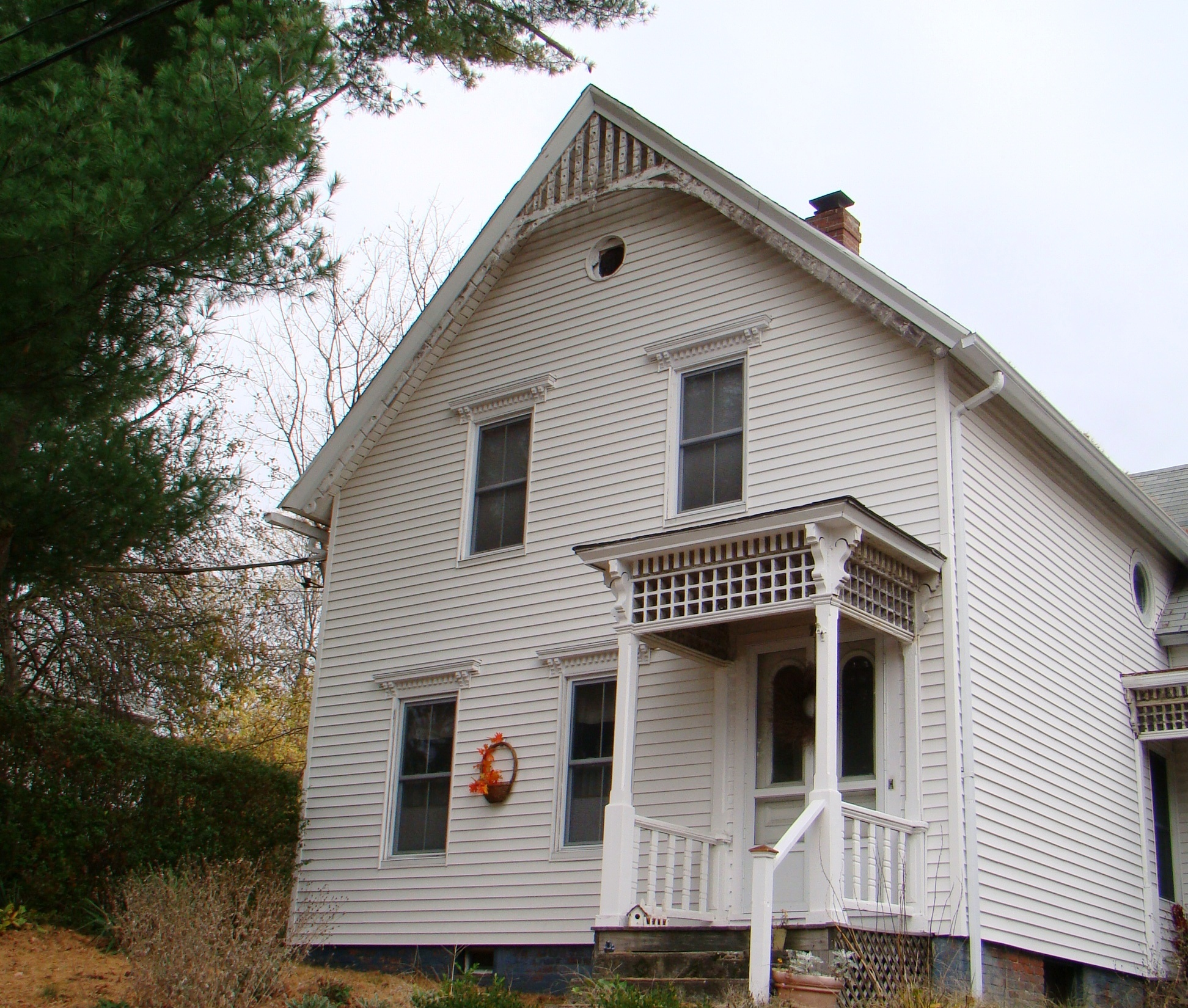
Jail Hill is now a diverse neighborhood.

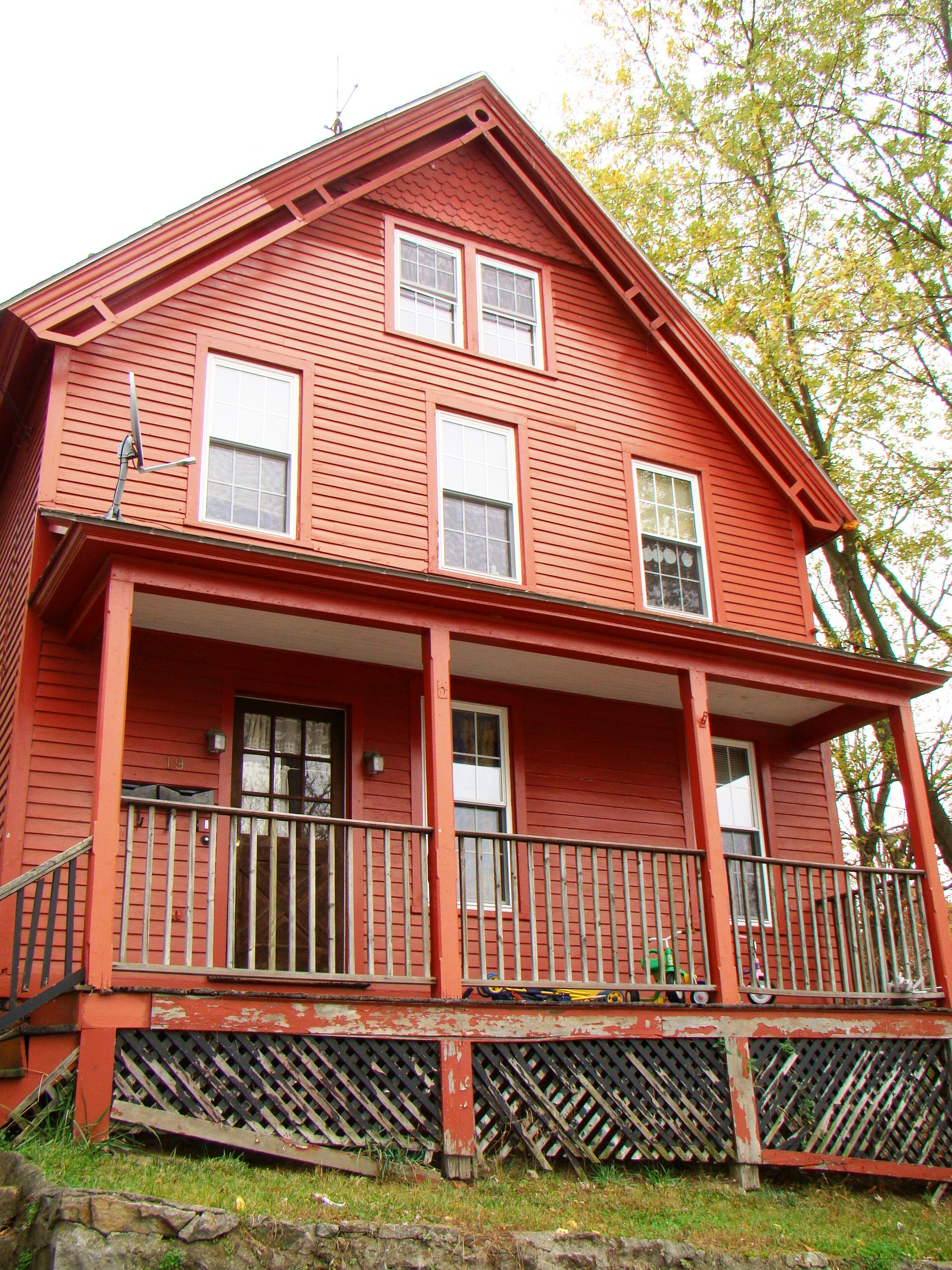
Red House on Jail Hill, Norwich, CT

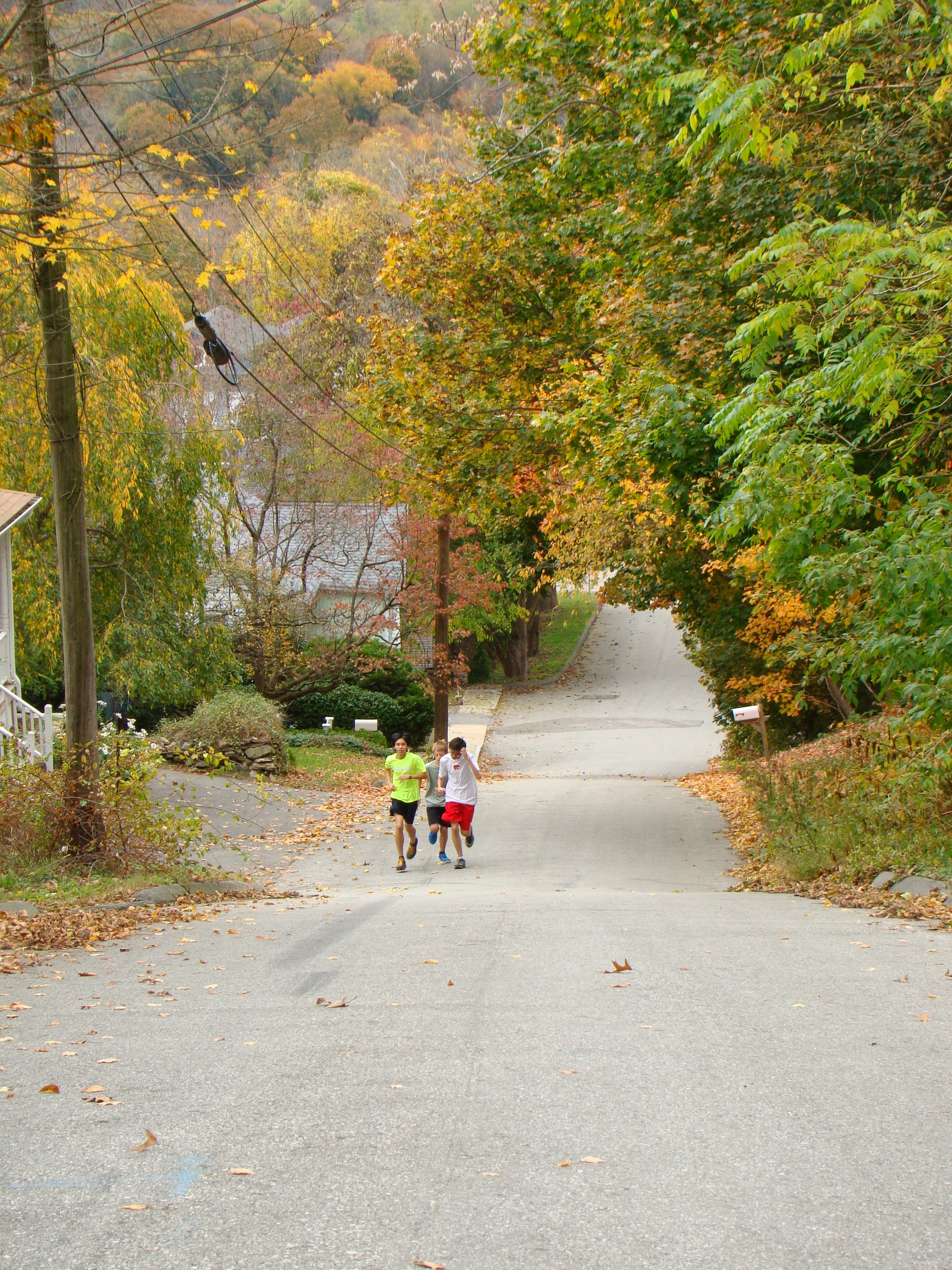
Jail Hill's Steep Climb

== See also ==
- Neighborhoods of Norwich, Connecticut
- National Register of Historic Places listings in New London County, Connecticut
