= James Smith (1587–1667) =

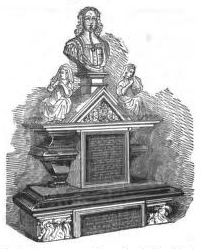
Monument to James Smith (1587–1667), St Paul's Church, Hammersmith. Drawn in 1839

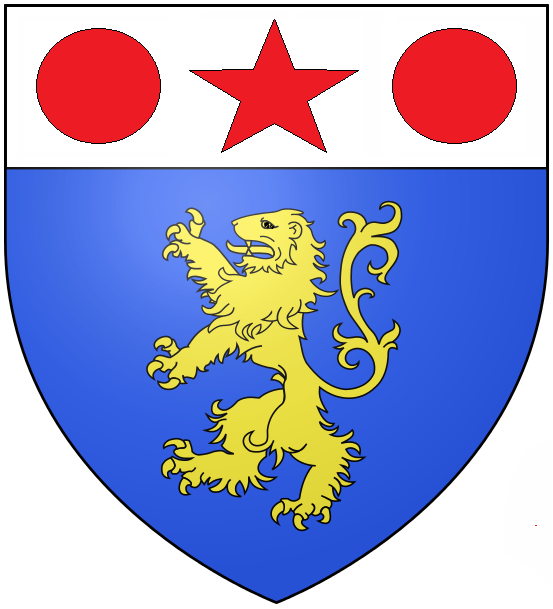
Arms of Smith of Isleworth, Middlesex (Smith Baronets): Azure, a lion rampant or on a chief argent a mullet gules between two torteaux

James Smith (1587–1667, alias James Smyth) of Hammersmith, Middlesex, was an Alderman of the City of London a member of the Worshipful Company of Salters and a Governor of Christ's Hospital in London. His monument survives in St Paul's Church, Hammersmith. He was the grandfather of Sir John Smith, 1st Baronet, of Isleworth.

== Origins ==
He was born in 1587 in the parish of Cookham, Berkshire. In the town of Maidenhead in the parish of Cookham he erected almshouses for the poor.

== Marriages and progeny ==
He married twice:

- Firstly to a certain Mary, by whom he had five children;
- Secondly to Sarah Cotton (1604-1680), only daughter of Robert Cotton, Gentleman, of West Barn Holt, Essex. She survived him, having borne him 15 children, including:
  - Sir John Smith (d.1670), Alderman and Sheriff of London in 1670, who married secondly to Jane Deane, by whom he had issue three sons and two daughters including Sir John Smith, 1st Baronet, of Isleworth (d.1726).

== Founds almshouses ==
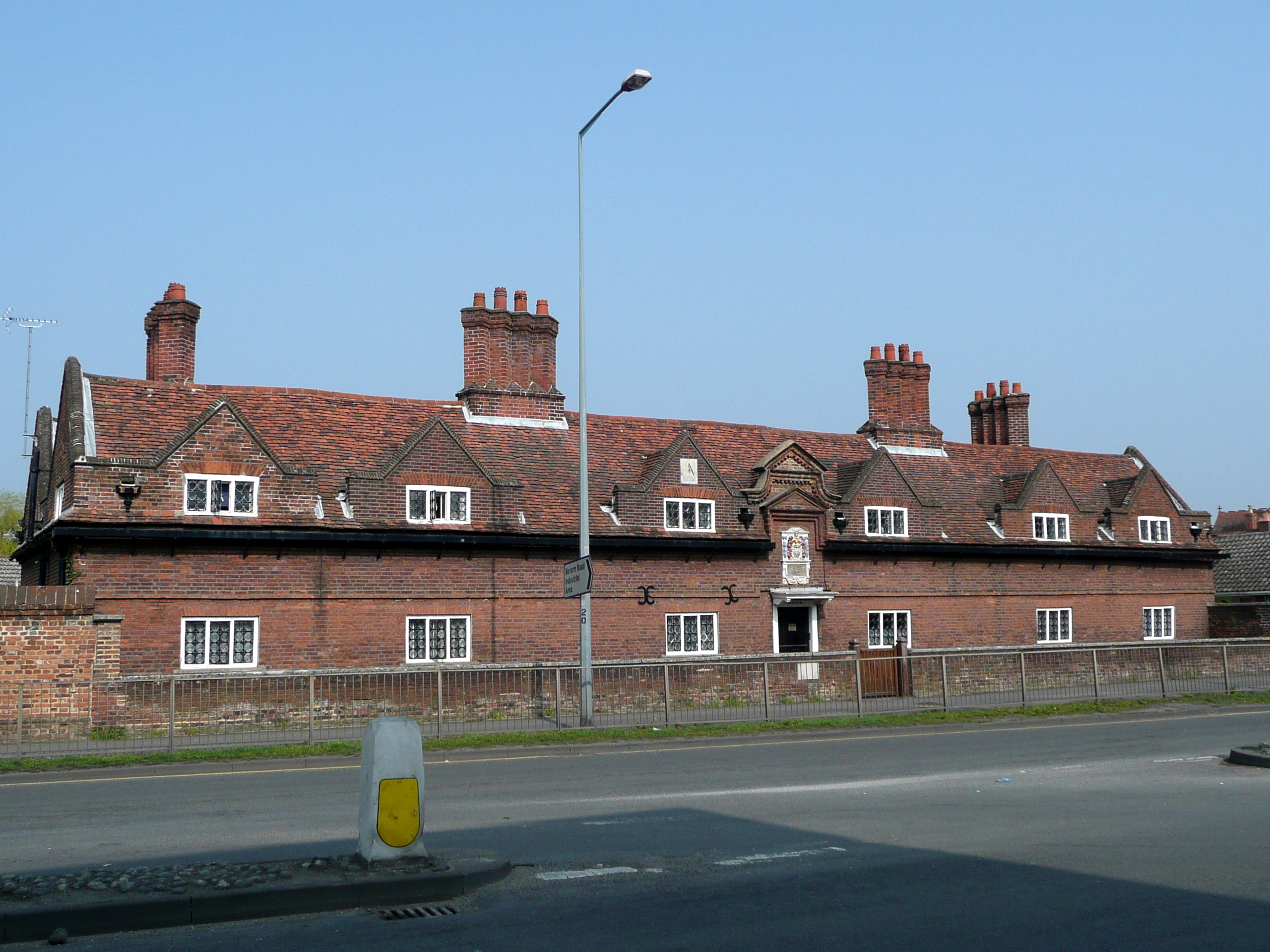
James Smith's Almshouses, Bridge Street, Maidenhead, founded in 1659, today known as Smyth's Almshouses

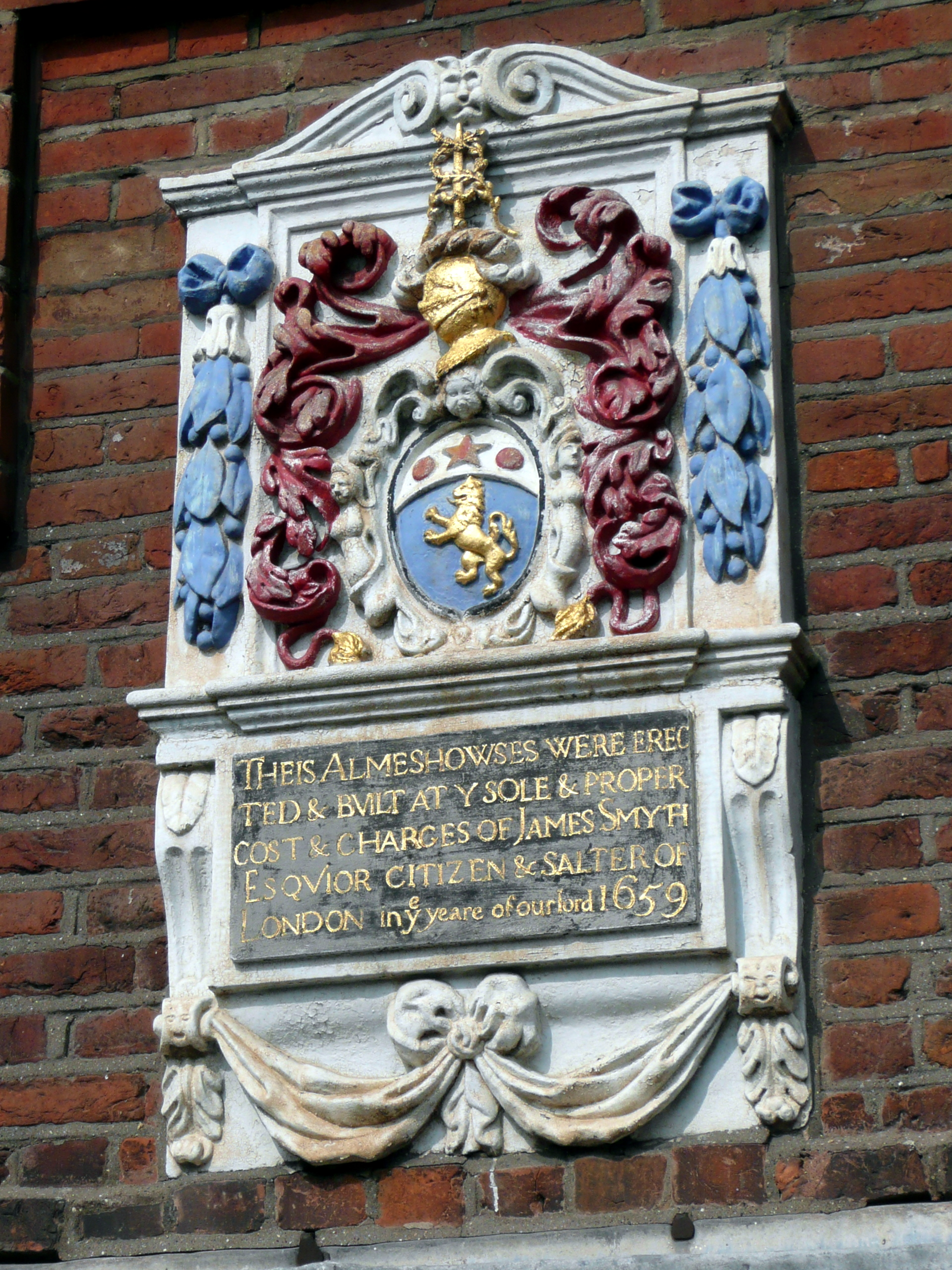
Inscription with arms of Smith on front of James Smith's Almshouses, Maidenhead

In the town of Maidenhead, then in the parish of Cookham, Berkshire, in which parish he was born, in 1659 he built eight almshouses of two rooms each for eight poor men, aged over 50 and parishioners of Cookham, and their wives. He endowed it with Norden's Farm, a 116-acre estate in the parish of Bray, the rental receipts from which were to be paid to the Worshipful Company of Salters which then distributed sums to the residents in amounts and at times as set down in the foundation deed. The Almshouses still operate today under the management of the Salters Company.

== Death ==
James Smith died on 10 October 1667, aged 80.

== Donation of silver chalices ==
He donated two silver chalices to Hammersmith Chapel, with London hall-mark of 1656, 77¾ inches high and 4¾ inches in diameter, each with a paten 6 inches in diameter, each one engraved with the arms of Smith: Azure, a lion or on a chief argent a mullet between two roundels gules. They are engraved with the following inscription:

"Theis cupps and Plates was guiven by James Smith Esq. to the Chappell of Hammersmith in the yeare of our Lord 1657".

== Monument ==
His monument was erected in the Chapel of St. Paul, in the hamlet of Hammersmith, built in 1631, then a chapel of ease of Fulham parish church. It was demolished and rebuilt in 1882 as St Paul's Church, Hammersmith, in which his monument was re-erected. The monument was described as follows by Falkner (1839):

"a stately monument of black marble; on the apex of the pediment is placed a blocking, on which stands the bust of Alderman Smith, in his gown, with a laced falling band, a flowing curled wig, whiskers, and beard, supported by two female weeping figures, of incongruous grouping and attitude. Under the pediment is a black marble tablet, within a fluted border, with ... inscription, and in the centre of the pediment is the family coat of arms. This monument derives additional interest by the display of the ... costume worn by the person whose resemblance it is intended to preserve. It is thus that the productions of the chisel become useful, by displaying authentic documents from which the future historian and sculptor may he enabled to describe and delineate faithfully, the fugitive fashions of by-gone ages".

His monument displays the following inscription:

"To the lasting memory of James Smith, Esq. Cittizen and Salter and sometimes Alderman of the Citty of London, who fined also for the Office of Sheriff and was one of the Governors of Christ's Hospitall of the said Citty. A good benefactor to his country in erecting Almes Houses for ye releife of the poore in the Parish of Cookeham, near Maidenhead, where he was born. He was also very liberall to the poore Children of Christ's Hospitall, and to the said Company of Salters, and very free in many other charitable uses for the good of the poore. He had the blessing of many Children, whereof five by Mary, his first wife, deceased; and by his second wife, Sarah, now living, fifteen, who, out of love to her deceased husband, hath erected this monument. He dyed the 10th of October, 1667, and in the 80th yeare of his age. Here also lyeth the body of Sarah Smith, widow of the abovesaid James Smith, the only daughter of Robert Cotton, late of West Barn Holt, in the County of Essex, Gent, deceased, and one truly joyned to her husband, not only in conjugal love and virtue, but also in bountiful charity, having largely augmented the guifts of her late husband, and then changed this life the 29th of January, 1680, and in the 76th year of her age".
