= Electoral results for the district of Dalby =

Queensland, Australia, district election results

This is a list of electoral results for the electoral district of Dalby in Queensland state elections.

== Members for Dalby ==
Member	Party	Term
Joshua Peter Bell	Unaligned	1873–1878
George Simpson	Unaligned	1878–1882
John Jessop	Unaligned	1882–1893
Joshua Thomas Bell	Ministerialist	1893–1911
William Vowles	Ministerialist/Liberal/National/Country	1911–1926
Wilfred Adams Russell	PPC/Country	1926–1932
Jim Sparkes	Country	1932–1935
Godfrey Morgan	Country	1935–1938
Aubrey Slessar	Labor	1938–1947
Charles Russell	Country	1947–1949

== Election results ==
=== Elections in the 1940s ===
1947 Queensland state election: Dalby
Party	Candidate	Votes	%	±%
Country	Charles Russell	5,736	59.1	+10.6
Labor	George Wilkes	3,977	40.9	−10.6
Total formal votes		9,713	98.8	+4.4
Informal votes		122	1.2	−4.4
Turnout		9,835	89.3	+0.8
Country gain from Labor		Swing	+10.6	

1944 Queensland state election: Dalby
Party	Candidate	Votes	%	±%
Labor	Aubrey Slessar	4,688	51.5	−4.5
Country	Charles Russell	4,409	48.5	+4.5
Total formal votes		9,097	94.4	−4.8
Informal votes		537	5.6	+4.8
Turnout		9,634	88.5	+1.4
Labor hold		Swing	−4.5	

1941 Queensland state election: Dalby
Party	Candidate	Votes	%	±%
Labor	Aubrey Slessar	5,434	56.0	+5.7
Country	Godfrey Morgan	4,262	44.0	−5.7
Total formal votes		9,696	99.2	+0.3
Informal votes		74	0.8	−0.3
Turnout		9,770	87.1	−4.6
Labor hold		Swing	+5.7	

=== Elections in the 1930s ===
1938 Queensland state election: Maree
Party	Candidate	Votes	%	±%
Labor	William King	5,201	53.3	−16.6
United Australia	William Carter	3,830	39.2	+9.1
Social Credit	Charles Martin	727	7.5	+7.5
Total formal votes		9,758	98.7	+1.4
Informal votes		128	1.3	−1.4
Turnout		9,886	94.4	+0.6
Labor hold		Swing	N/A	

- Preferences were not distributed.

1935 Queensland state election: Dalby
Party	Candidate	Votes	%	±%
CPNP	Godfrey Morgan	4,373	51.8	
Labor	George Wilkes	4,061	48.2	
Total formal votes		8,434	99.0	
Informal votes		84	1.0	
Turnout		8,518	93.1	
CPNP hold		Swing		

1932 Queensland state election: Dalby
Party	Candidate	Votes	%	±%
CPNP	Jim Sparkes	3,904	53.8	
Labor	Adolphus Baker	3,349	46.2	
Total formal votes		7,253	99.2	
Informal votes		56	0.8	
Turnout		7,309	93.3	
CPNP hold		Swing		

=== Elections in the 1920s ===
1929 Queensland state election: Dalby
Party	Candidate	Votes	%	±%
CPNP	Wilfred Russell	3,511	65.9	+38.3
Labor	Clive Curtis	1,816	34.1	+3.0
Total formal votes		5,327		
Informal votes				
Turnout				
CPNP gain from Independent		Swing	N/A	

1926 Queensland state election: Dalby
Party	Candidate	Votes	%	±%
Primary Producers	Wilfred Russell	2,347	41.4	+41.4
Labor	Harold Francis	1,762	31.1	−6.6
CPNP	William Vowles	1,563	27.6	−21.2
Total formal votes		5,672	98.9	+1.0
Informal votes		64	1.1	−1.0
Turnout		5,736	91.2	+6.5
Two-candidate-preferred result
Primary Producers	Wilfred Russell	3,529	65.7	+65.7
Labor	Harold Francis	1,842	34.3	+7.2
Primary Producers gain from CPNP		Swing	N/A	

1923 Queensland state election: Dalby
Party	Candidate	Votes	%	±%
Country	William Vowles	2,679	48.8	−13.7
Labor	Hugh McAnally	2,069	37.7	+0.2
Independent Country	N C Hooper	743	13.5	+13.5
Total formal votes		5,491	97.9	−1.4
Informal votes		120	2.1	+1.4
Turnout		5,611	84.7	+0.8
Two-party-preferred result
Country	William Vowles	3,086	58.1	−4.4
Labor	Hugh McAnally	2,221	41.9	+4.4
Country hold		Swing	−4.4	

1920 Queensland state election: Dalby
Party	Candidate	Votes	%	±%
Country	William Vowles	3,005	62.5	+62.5
Labor	James Connolly	1,804	37.5	−5.6
Total formal votes		4,849	99.3	−0.1
Informal votes		35	0.7	+0.1
Turnout		4,884	83.9	+4.1
Country gain from National		Swing	N/A	

=== Elections in the 1910s ===
1918 Queensland state election: Dalby
Party	Candidate	Votes	%	±%
National	William Vowles	2,686	56.9	+23.3
Labor	Austin McKeon	2,033	43.1	+0.6
Total formal votes		4,719	99.4	+1.5
Informal votes		28	0.6	−1.5
Turnout		4,747	79.8	−4.7
National hold		Swing	+3.7	

1915 Queensland state election: Dalby
Party	Candidate	Votes	%	±%
Labor	John Connolly	1,788	42.5	−0.4
Liberal	William Vowles	1,414	33.6	−23.5
Farmers' Union	Frederick Bradhurst	1,004	23.9	+23.9
Total formal votes		4,206	97.9	−1.6
Informal votes		89	2.1	+1.6
Turnout		4,295	84.5	+9.1
Two-party-preferred result
Liberal	William Vowles	2,165	53.2	−3.9
Labor	John Connolly	1,902	46.8	+3.9
Liberal hold		Swing	−3.9	

1912 Queensland state election: Dalby
Party	Candidate	Votes	%	±%
Liberal	William Vowles	1,992	57.1	
Labor	Robert Turnbull	1,497	42.9	
Total formal votes		3,489	99.5	
Informal votes		19	0.5	
Turnout		3,508	75.4	
Liberal hold		Swing		
