= Electoral results for the district of Lockyer =

Queensland, Australia, district election results

This is a list of electoral results for the electoral district of Lockyer in Queensland state elections.

== Members for Lockyer ==
First incarnation (1888–1932)
Member	Party	Term
William North	Unaligned	1888–1893
William Drayton Armstrong	Various^{1}	1893–1904
Michael O'Keefe	Ministerialist	1904–1907
William Drayton Armstrong	Various^{1}	1907–1918
Cuthbert Butler	Labor	1918–1920
George Logan	Country	1920–1929
Charles Jamieson	Independent	1929–1932
Second incarnation (1950–present)
Member	Party	Term
(Sir) Gordon Chalk	Liberal	1950–1976
Tony Bourke	Liberal	1976–1980
Tony Fitzgerald	National	1980–1998
Peter Prenzler	One Nation	1998–1999
Peter Prenzler	City Country Alliance	1999–2001
Bill Flynn	One Nation	2001–2004
Ian Rickuss	National	2004–2008
Ian Rickuss	Liberal National	2008–2017
Jim McDonald	Liberal National	2017–present

^{1} William Drayton Armstrong alternately listed his party alignment as Liberal, Opposition, and Ministeralist (twice). The parliamentary members' register does not list dates for these changes.

== Election results ==
=== Elections in the 2020s ===
2024 Queensland state election: Lockyer
Party	Candidate	Votes	%	±%
Liberal National	Jim McDonald	17,909	52.74	+7.64
Labor	Euan Tiernan	6,758	19.90	−4.80
One Nation	Corey West	5,351	15.76	+2.46
Greens	Paul Toner	2,120	6.24	+1.34
Family First	Julie Rose	1,822	5.36	+5.36
Total formal votes		33,960	96.14	−0.38
Informal votes		1,363	3.86	+0.38
Turnout		35,323	89.40	−0.33
Two-party-preferred result
Liberal National	Jim McDonald	23,488	69.16	+7.56
Labor	Euan Tiernan	10,472	30.84	−7.56
Liberal National hold		Swing	+7.56	

2020 Queensland state election: Lockyer
Party	Candidate	Votes	%	±%
Liberal National	Jim McDonald	13,662	45.15	+9.33
Labor	Janet Butler	7,477	24.71	+1.81
One Nation	Corey West	4,010	13.25	−21.13
Independent	Jim Savage	3,057	10.10	+10.10
Greens	Rebecca Haley	1,489	4.92	+0.38
United Australia	Andrew Rockliff	563	1.86	+1.86
Total formal votes		30,258	96.52	+0.42
Informal votes		1,091	3.48	−0.42
Turnout		31,349	89.73	−0.11
Two-party-preferred result
Liberal National	Jim McDonald	18,616	61.52	−0.30
Labor	Janet Butler	11,642	38.48	+0.30
Liberal National hold		Swing	−0.30	

=== Elections in the 2010s ===
2017 Queensland state election: Lockyer
Party	Candidate	Votes	%	±%
Liberal National	Jim McDonald	10,377	35.8	+0.8
One Nation	Jim Savage	9,960	34.4	+8.5
Labor	Nicole Lincoln	6,635	22.9	−2.6
Greens	Ian Simons	1,317	4.5	+0.9
Independent	Tony Parr	683	2.4	+2.4
Total formal votes		28,972	96.1	−2.3
Informal votes		1,176	3.9	+2.3
Turnout		30,148	89.8	+1.6
Two-candidate-preferred result
Liberal National	Jim McDonald	15,666	54.1	+2.5
One Nation	Jim Savage	13,306	45.9	−2.5
Liberal National hold		Swing	+2.5	

2015 Queensland state election: Lockyer
Party	Candidate	Votes	%	±%
Liberal National	Ian Rickuss	10,259	33.73	−18.28
One Nation	Pauline Hanson	8,132	26.74	+26.74
Labor	Steve Leese	7,652	25.16	+7.48
Katter's Australian	David Neuendorf	2,111	6.94	−16.88
Greens	Clare Rudkin	1,190	3.91	−2.58
Palmer United	Craig Gunnis	1,068	3.51	+3.51
Total formal votes		30,412	98.46	+0.8
Informal votes		476	1.54	−0.8
Turnout		30,888	92.14	−1.52
Two-candidate-preferred result
Liberal National	Ian Rickuss	13,230	50.22	−14.65
One Nation	Pauline Hanson	13,116	49.78	+49.78
Liberal National hold		Swing	−14.65	

2012 Queensland state election: Lockyer
Party	Candidate	Votes	%	±%
Liberal National	Ian Rickuss	14,348	52.01	−1.55
Katter's Australian	David Neuendorf	6,571	23.82	+23.82
Labor	James Wilson	4,876	17.68	−19.94
Greens	Clare Rudkin	1,790	6.49	−2.33
Total formal votes		27,585	97.66	−0.07
Informal votes		661	2.34	+0.07
Turnout		28,246	93.66	−0.77
Two-candidate-preferred result
Liberal National	Ian Rickuss	15,387	64.87	+7.26
Katter's Australian	David Neuendorf	8,334	35.13	+35.13
Liberal National hold		Swing	+7.26	

=== Elections in the 2000s ===
2009 Queensland state election: Lockyer
Party	Candidate	Votes	%	±%
Liberal National	Ian Rickuss	13,761	53.6	+7.5
Labor	John Kelly	9,667	37.6	−2.4
Greens	Emma Hine	2,267	8.8	+2.9
Total formal votes		25,695	97.5	
Informal votes		598	2.5	
Turnout		26,293	92.9	
Two-party-preferred result
Liberal National	Ian Rickuss	14,193	57.6	+4.2
Labor	John Kelly	10,444	42.4	−4.2
Liberal National hold		Swing	+4.2	

2006 Queensland state election: Lockyer
Party	Candidate	Votes	%	±%
National	Ian Rickuss	11,821	44.4	+9.6
Labor	John Kelly	11,037	41.5	+9.8
Family First	Helen Muller	2,138	8.0	+8.0
Greens	Luc Muller	1,620	6.1	+1.6
Total formal votes		26,616	97.8	−0.0
Informal votes		564	2.2	+0.0
Turnout		27,222	92.7	−0.4
Two-party-preferred result
National	Ian Rickuss	12,855	51.7	−2.4
Labor	John Kelly	11,989	48.3	+2.4
National hold		Swing	−2.4	

2004 Queensland state election: Lockyer
Party	Candidate	Votes	%	±%
National	Ian Rickuss	8,675	34.8	+17.9
Labor	John Kelly	7,897	31.7	+4.2
One Nation	Bill Flynn	5,110	20.5	−7.8
Independent	Peter Prenzler	2,080	8.4	+8.4
Greens	Marie Johnston	1,132	4.5	+1.7
Total formal votes		24,894	97.8	−0.4
Informal votes		564	2.2	+0.4
Turnout		25,458	93.1	−1.4
Two-party-preferred result
National	Ian Rickuss	10,914	54.1	+54.1
Labor	John Kelly	9,252	45.9	+3.2
National gain from One Nation		Swing	N/A	

2001 Queensland state election: Lockyer
Party	Candidate	Votes	%	±%
One Nation	Bill Flynn	6,608	28.3	−9.0
Labor	Virginia Clarke	6,428	27.5	+4.7
City Country Alliance	Peter Prenzler	4,197	18.0	+18.0
National	Lindsay Christensen	3,947	16.9	−7.4
Independent	Ken Murray	1,170	5.0	+5.0
Greens	Jo Nemeth	665	2.8	+2.6
Independent	Angela Micallef	325	1.4	+1.4
Total formal votes		23,340	98.2	
Informal votes		434	1.8	
Turnout		23,774	94.4	
Two-candidate-preferred result
One Nation	Bill Flynn	10,108	57.3	+4.2
Labor	Virginia Clarke	7,533	42.7	+42.7
One Nation hold		Swing	+4.2	

=== Elections in the 1990s ===
1998 Queensland state election: Lockyer
Party	Candidate	Votes	%	±%
One Nation	Peter Prenzler	9,943	39.2	+39.2
National	Tony Fitzgerald	6,473	25.5	−41.1
Labor	Dan O'Brien	5,324	21.0	−5.8
Independent	Jim McDonald	2,768	10.9	+10.9
Reform	Tony Howard	680	2.7	+2.7
Shooters	Patricia Andrew	160	0.6	+0.6
Total formal votes		25,348	98.8	+0.4
Informal votes		296	1.2	−0.4
Turnout		25,644	94.7	+0.9
Two-candidate-preferred result
One Nation	Peter Prenzler	11,742	53.7	+53.7
National	Tony Fitzgerald	10,134	46.3	−24.5
One Nation gain from National		Swing	+53.7	

1995 Queensland state election: Lockyer
Party	Candidate	Votes	%	±%
National	Tony Fitzgerald	15,390	66.6	+16.5
Labor	Lance McCallum	6,183	26.8	−2.8
Confederate Action	Pat Andrew	1,527	6.6	−4.8
Total formal votes		23,100	98.4	+0.1
Informal votes		374	1.6	−0.1
Turnout		23,474	93.8	
Two-party-preferred result
National	Tony Fitzgerald	16,168	70.8	+5.7
Labor	Lance McCallum	6,663	29.2	−5.7
National hold		Swing	+5.7	

1992 Queensland state election: Lockyer
Party	Candidate	Votes	%	±%
National	Tony Fitzgerald	10,757	50.1	+4.4
Labor	Lyn Kally	6,353	29.6	−0.3
Confederate Action	Geoff Abnett	2,450	11.4	+11.4
Liberal	Robert Lucas	1,902	8.9	−6.4
Total formal votes		21,462	98.3	
Informal votes		375	1.7	
Turnout		21,837	93.9	
Two-party-preferred result
National	Tony Fitzgerald	13,163	65.1	+1.4
Labor	Lyn Kally	7,060	34.9	−1.4
National hold		Swing	+1.4	

=== Elections in the 1980s ===
1989 Queensland state election: Lockyer
Party	Candidate	Votes	%	±%
National	Tony Fitzgerald	9,090	47.1	−14.2
Labor	Marie Klajn	4,952	25.7	+6.1
Liberal	Fabius Manners	3,821	19.8	+0.7
Independent	Bryan Greenham	1,066	5.5	+5.5
Independent	Peter McKinlay	356	1.9	+1.9
Total formal votes		19,285	97.8	−0.8
Informal votes		439	2.2	+0.8
Turnout		19,724	92.7	−0.2
Two-party-preferred result
National	Tony Fitzgerald	13,172	68.3	−6.8
Labor	Marie Klajn	6,113	31.7	+6.8
National hold		Swing	−6.8	

1986 Queensland state election: Lockyer
Party	Candidate	Votes	%	±%
National	Tony FitzGerald	10,918	61.3	−0.3
Labor	Jack Phelan	3,490	19.6	−2.7
Liberal	Fabius Manners	3,407	19.1	+3.0
Total formal votes		17,815	98.6	
Informal votes		255	1.4	
Turnout		18,070	92.9	
Two-party-preferred result
National	Tony FitzGerald	13,379	75.1	+0.6
Labor	Jack Phelan	4,436	24.9	−0.6
National hold		Swing	+0.6	

1983 Queensland state election: Lockyer
Party	Candidate	Votes	%	±%
National	Tony Fitzgerald	11,040	61.6	+33.3
Labor	Sheila Forknall	4,007	22.4	+4.6
Liberal	Tony Bourke	2,878	16.1	−17.2
Total formal votes		17,925	99.1	+0.5
Informal votes		164	0.9	−0.5
Turnout		18,089	92.7	+1.8
Two-party-preferred result
National	Tony Fitzgerald	13,275	74.1	+3.3
Labor	Sheila Forknall	4,650	25.9	−3.3
National hold		Swing	+3.3	

1980 Queensland state election: Lockyer
Party	Candidate	Votes	%	±%
Liberal	Tony Bourke	5,286	33.3	−21.7
National	Tony Fitzgerald	4,497	28.3	+28.3
Labor	Michael Forde	2,826	17.8	−1.8
National	Terence Day	2,603	16.4	+16.4
Democrats	Rae Capon	505	3.2	−5.6
Progress	Michael Berry	169	1.1	+1.1
Total formal votes		15,886	98.6	−0.4
Informal votes		223	1.4	+0.4
Turnout		16,109	90.9	−2.9
Two-candidate-preferred result
National	Tony Fitzgerald	8,949	56.3	+56.3
Liberal	Tony Bourke	6,937	43.7	−28.8
National gain from Liberal		Swing	N/A	

=== Elections in the 1970s ===
1977 Queensland state election: Lockyer
Party	Candidate	Votes	%	±%
Liberal	Tony Bourke	8,337	55.0	−1.0
Labor	Norma Jones	2,970	19.6	+0.1
Independent	William Pechey	2,528	16.7	+16.7
Democrats	Brian Otto	1,329	8.8	+8.8
Total formal votes		15,164	99.0	
Informal votes		159	1.0	
Turnout		15,323	93.8	
Two-party-preferred result
Liberal	Tony Bourke	10,997	72.5	−3.4
Labor	Norma Jones	4,167	27.5	+3.4
Liberal hold		Swing	−3.4	

1974 Queensland state election: Lockyer
Party	Candidate	Votes	%	±%
Liberal	Gordon Chalk	7,676	56.0	−6.2
Independent	Kenneth Hooper	3,359	24.5	+24.5
Labor	Lindesay Jones	2,677	19.5	−18.3
Total formal votes		13,712	99.1	+0.8
Informal votes		130	0.9	−0.8
Turnout		13,842	90.2	−3.7
Two-party-preferred result
Liberal	Gordon Chalk	10,363	75.6	+13.4
Labor	Lindesay Jones	3,349	24.4	−13.4
Liberal hold		Swing	+13.4	

1972 Queensland state election: Lockyer
Party	Candidate	Votes	%	±%
Liberal	Gordon Chalk	7,217	62.2	−1.4
Labor	Lindesay Jones	4,380	37.8	+37.8
Total formal votes		11,597	98.3	
Informal votes		204	1.7	
Turnout		11,801	93.9	
Liberal hold		Swing	−1.7	

=== Elections in the 1960s ===
1969 Queensland state election: Lockyer
Party	Candidate	Votes	%	±%
Liberal	Gordon Chalk	5,235	63.6	−3.3
Independent	James Ryan	2,277	27.7	+27.7
Queensland Labor	Bailey Pashley	723	8.8	+8.8
Total formal votes		8,235	99.3	−0.1
Informal votes		61	0.7	+0.1
Turnout		8,296	95.4	−0.5
Two-candidate-preferred result
Liberal	Gordon Chalk	5,824	70.7	+3.9
Independent	James Ryan	2,411	29.3	+29.3
Liberal hold		Swing	+3.9	

1966 Queensland state election: Lockyer
Party	Candidate	Votes	%	±%
Liberal	Gordon Chalk	5,473	66.9	+5.3
Labor	James Keim	2,705	33.1	+1.1
Total formal votes		8,178	99.4	0.0
Informal votes		45	0.6	0.0
Turnout		8,223	95.9	−0.7
Liberal hold		Swing	+0.4	

1963 Queensland state election: Lockyer
Party	Candidate	Votes	%	±%
Liberal	Gordon Chalk	5,035	61.6	−1.8
Labor	James Keim	2,599	32.0	+32.0
Queensland Labor	Brian Hannan	382	4.7	+4.7
Independent	James Dwyer	112	1.4	−0.7
Total formal votes		8,128	99.4	+0.4
Informal votes		49	0.6	−0.4
Turnout		8,177	96.6	+0.9
Two-party-preferred result
Liberal	Gordon Chalk	5,402	66.5	
Labor	James Keim	2,726	33.5	
Liberal hold		Swing	N/A	

1960 Queensland state election: Lockyer
Party	Candidate	Votes	%	±%
Liberal	Gordon Chalk	5,077	63.4	
Independent Country	John Martin	2,319	28.9	
Independent Labor	Edwin Olm	447	5.6	
Independent	James Dwyer	169	2.1	
Total formal votes		8,012	99.0	
Informal votes		82	1.0	
Turnout		8,094	95.7	
Liberal hold		Swing		

=== Elections in the 1950s ===
1957 Queensland state election: Lockyer
Party	Candidate	Votes	%	±%
Liberal	Gordon Chalk	7,600	78.9	−21.1
Independent	Jim Dwyer	2,032	21.1	+21.1
Total formal votes		9,632	98.2	
Informal votes		180	1.8	
Turnout		9,812	94.7	
Liberal hold		Swing	−21.1	

1956 Queensland state election: Lockyer
Party	Candidate	Votes	%	±%
Liberal	Gordon Chalk	unopposed		
Liberal hold		Swing		

1953 Queensland state election: Lockyer
Party	Candidate	Votes	%	±%
Liberal	Gordon Chalk	6,177	67.1	+3.9
Labor	John Hilton	3,032	32.9	+7.7
Total formal votes		9,209	99.5	−0.1
Informal votes		47	0.5	+0.1
Turnout		9,256	95.4	+2.2
Liberal hold		Swing	−4.4	

1950 Queensland state election: Lockyer
Party	Candidate	Votes	%	±%
Liberal	Gordon Chalk	5,564	63.2	
Labor	Andrew Crilly	2,219	25.2	
Independent	Tom Ford	1,019	11.6	
Total formal votes		8,802	99.6	
Informal votes		31	0.4	
Turnout		8,833	93.2	
Liberal hold		Swing		

=== Elections in the 1920s ===
1929 Queensland state election: Lockyer
Party	Candidate	Votes	%	±%
Independent	Charles Jamieson	3,077	54.5	+54.5
CPNP	George Logan	2,573	45.5	+1.6
Total formal votes		5,650	99.3	−0.1
Informal votes		42	0.7	+0.1
Turnout		5,692		
Independent gain from CPNP		Swing	N/A	

1926 Queensland state election: Lockyer
Party	Candidate	Votes	%	±%
CPNP	George Logan	2,335	43.9	+0.5
Primary Producers	Charles Jamieson	1,567	29.2	+29.2
Labor	Joseph Sweeney	1,442	26.9	−14.2
Total formal votes		5,364	99.3	+0.3
Informal votes		36	0.7	−0.3
Turnout		5,400	93.8	+2.6
Two-candidate-preferred result
CPNP	George Logan	2,470	57.6	+0.7
Primary Producers	Charles Jamieson	1,821	42.4	+42.4
CPNP hold		Swing	N/A	

1923 Queensland state election: Lockyer
Party	Candidate	Votes	%	±%
Country	George Logan	2,384	43.4	−9.9
Labor	Albert Kluck	2,257	41.1	−5.6
Independent	William Drayton Armstrong	849	15.5	+15.5
Total formal votes		5,490	99.0	−0.5
Informal votes		56	1.0	+0.5
Turnout		5,546	91.2	+1.5
Two-party-preferred result
Country	George Logan	3,037	56.9	+3.6
Labor	Albert Kluck	2,301	43.1	−3.6
Country hold		Swing	+3.6	

1920 Queensland state election: Lockyer
Party	Candidate	Votes	%	±%
Country	George Logan	1,731	53.3	+53.3
Labor	Cuthbert Butler	1,519	46.7	−5.8
Total formal votes		3,250	99.5	−0.2
Informal votes		16	0.5	+0.2
Turnout		3,266	89.7	+3.4
Country gain from Labor		Swing	N/A	

=== Elections in the 1910s ===
1918 Queensland state election: Lockyer
Party	Candidate	Votes	%	±%
Labor	Cuthbert Butler	1,716	52.5	+35.6
National	William Drayton Armstrong	1,554	47.5	−4.2
Total formal votes		3,270	99.7	+1.4
Informal votes		9	0.3	−1.4
Turnout		3,279	86.3	−3.3
Labor gain from National		Swing	N/A	

1915 Queensland state election: Lockyer
Party	Candidate	Votes	%	±%
Liberal	William Drayton Armstrong	1,525	51.7	−48.3
Farmers' Union	William McIllwraith	926	31.4	+31.4
Labor	Charles Bromley	499	16.9	+16.9
Total formal votes		2,950	98.3	
Informal votes		51	1.7	
Turnout		3,001	89.6	
Liberal hold		Swing	N/A	

1912 Queensland state election: Lockyer
Party	Candidate	Votes	%	±%
Liberal	William Drayton Armstrong	unopposed		
Liberal hold		Swing		
