= 1860 West Moreton colonial by-election =

The 1860 West Moreton colonial by-election was a by-election held on 9 July 1860 in the electoral district of West Moreton for the Queensland Legislative Assembly.

== History ==
On 22 June 1860, William Nelson, member for West Moreton, was unseated by petition. Joseph Fleming won the resulting by-election on 9 July 1860.

== See also ==
- Members of the Queensland Legislative Assembly, 1860–1863
