= 1862 West Moreton colonial by-election =

The 1862 West Moreton colonial by-election was a by-election held on 15 December 1862 in the electoral district of West Moreton for the Queensland Legislative Assembly.

== History ==
On 3 November 1862, Joseph Fleming, the member for West Moreton, resigned. Joshua Peter Bell won the resulting by-election on 15 December 1862.

== See also ==
- Members of the Queensland Legislative Assembly, 1860–1863
