= Westbrook Homestead =

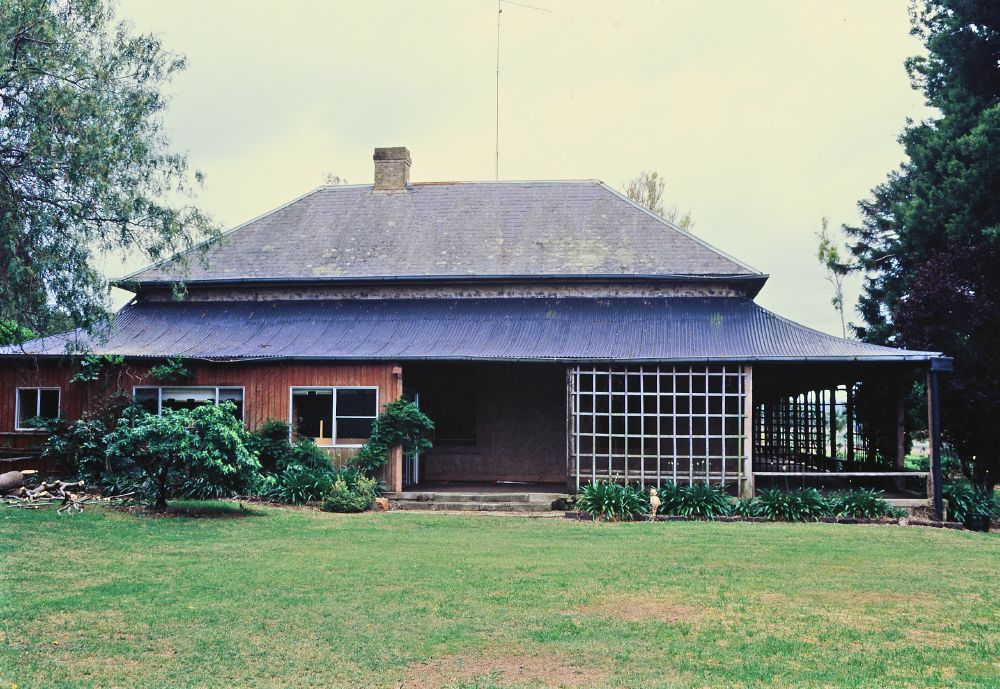
- Westbrook Homestead, 1999

- Location within Queensland Location within Australia
- 27.6008°S 151.7936°E
- Location: Coupers Road, Westbrook, Toowoomba Region, Queensland, Australia

History
- Design period: 1840s - 1860s (mid-19th century)
- Built: 1864 - 1867

Queensland Heritage Register
- Official name: Westbrook Homestead
- Type: state heritage (built, archaeological, landscape)
- Designated: 21 October 1992
- Reference no.: 600636
- Significant period: 1860s (historical); 1860s (fabric)
- Significant components: trees/plantings, kitchen/kitchen house, driveway, garden/grounds, chimney/chimney stack, residential accommodation - main house

Westbrook Homestead is a heritage-listed homestead at Coupers Road, Westbrook, Toowoomba Region, Queensland, Australia. It was built from 1864 to 1867. It was added to the Queensland Heritage Register on 21 October 1992.

== History ==
Westbrook Homestead was constructed in 1867 on land taken up by John "Tinker" Campbell in 1841 as one of the first pastoral runs on the Darling Downs.

Allan Cunningham, botanist and explorer, first visited the region in which Westbrook is located, the Darling Downs, in 1827. He considered the discovery of this fertile pastoral land as one of his greatest achievements. Thirteen years later, grazier Patrick Leslie decided to look for land north of Penrith where he was renting a farm. With his brothers and a large party, he set out for the Clarence River district, and then, with one convict, set out to explore the Darling Downs. In 1840, he established the first pastoral runs on the Downs, Toolburra and Canning Downs.

John "Tinker" Campbell named the station after his birthplace in Portland, Maine, US. He was the only child born to the Campbell family after their migration in 1808 to North America from Scotland in The Clarendon via Prince Edward Island. His arrival in Australia on Monday 15 September 1834 in the brig he had purchased, named the Micmac, from Liverpool, Nova Scotia with his wife Temperance and first born son, John Edwin was reported in the Sydney Herald Newspaper of 18 SEPT 1834. After selling the tinware he transported in the Micmac, and the brig, in Sydney, to finance his Australian venture, Campbell set up an inn at Muswellbrook and acquired two small runs, one on the Hunter River and one on the Gwydir in 1839. As this run was in dispute, he looked for land further north in 1840. After an abortive attempt to settle at Kittah Kittah near Goondiwindi, he moved to the Darling Downs in 1841, taking up Westbrook. However, Campbell then had the misfortune to experience bad seasons followed by the collapse of several commercial ventures, including the establishment of a boiling down works at Brisbane. This led to his selling Westbrook to John Stevens in December 1843 for £300 plus 12/6 a head for the stock. In mid 1844 the Campbells quit Westbrook and in late 1846 the run was sold to Henry Hughes and Isaac, owners of Gowrie Station, and was reduced by 5000 acres to 45,000 acres in 1850. In 1853 Westbrook changed hands again, passing to John Donald McLean for £12,000. In 1855 McLean married and toured Europe for three years and William Beit, who had become McLean's partner, moved to Westbrook to manage it in 1856.

In 1860 McLean leased a house in Sydney and in 1865 built a large mansion at Edgecliffe for his family, although in 1862 he became a Member for the Eastern Downs in the Queensland Parliament. By this time, he had acquired a financial interest in many runs throughout southern and western Queensland. The partnership made a number of improvements to Westbrook and by the early 1860s planned a more substantial homestead to replace the existing slab building, which had probably been erected by Campbell.

The new homestead was built to the south of the previous one, which was well located in an elevated position overlooking Westbrook Creek and by then had a small "village" of working buildings and accommodation around it. It was constructed of bluestone quarried on Westbrook land at a location near Toowoomba. The roof was of imported English slate and cedar was used for most of the joinery. William Beit married Mary Kellett in 1864 and McLean appears to have spent at least some of his time residing at Westbrook. The number of bedrooms and size of reception rooms in the new Westbrook homestead would have made the home appropriate for both Beit's planned family and to allow McLean to accommodate visitors and family members. However, Mary Beit was killed in a carriage accident in September 1865 and McLean was thrown from his horse on 16 December 1866 and killed, after briefly serving as Colonial Treasurer. He was buried at Westbrook and a parish nearby was named in his honour.

The house was completed in 1867 and a freestone block above door is carved with "McL & B 1867". Given the prior deaths of both McLean and Mrs Beit, this may have been intended as a form of commemoration.

In 1871 Beit married Sarah Kellet, possibly a relative of his previous wife, but died on the return voyage from an overseas trip in 1872 and his son was born posthumously. Westbrook was sold by auction in Sydney and was purchased by the firm of Shanahan and Jennings who owned several large stations in New South Wales. J H Davidson, brother-in-law of Sir Patrick Jennings, past Premier of New South Wales, took up residence at Westbrook with his family. The second Mrs Beit moved to a large house that she had built in Toowoomba and which she named Westbrook Hall after the station.

Although Westbrook, like many early runs, had originally covered a huge area, land had been resumed in 1855, some of which became part of Drayton. After Queensland became a self-governing colony in 1859, frequent subdivisions occurred as various land acts sought to break up large runs for agriculture and closer settlement. McLean and Beit managed to maintain control over waterways by presumptive selection and converting land to freehold. In 1868, a reserve was resumed from the property that later became the town of Oakey.

Shanahan and Jennings maintained possession of Westbrook until 1898 and planted 60 acres close to the homestead with vineyards, chestnuts, olives, peaches, and other fruit. The station was also well known for cattle and horse breeding. In 1898 nearly 10,000 acres of Westbrook land were acquired by the government under the Agricultural Lands Purchase Act of 1894, subdivided and sold as farm blocks. The blocks were eagerly purchased and the value of the land quickly rose. The rest of the estate was then privately surveyed, subdivided and sold and the homestead block, containing 9000 acres, was sold to Messrs Couper and Raulston, when it was cut into three dairy farms.

FGG Couper died in 1938. In 1942 children from the Tufnell Home at Nundah were evacuated to Westbrook and remained there until 1945, when Ralph Couper converted Westbrook into a boarding school for boys. It was intended that the pupils should receive agricultural as well as academic training. Work carried out at Westbrook included adapting and renovating the building and erecting two classrooms. A sports oval was cleared and two tennis courts created. During Westbrook's use as a school, large sections of the roof slates were replaced by corrugated iron. The school closed in late 1948 and most of the buildings were sold for removal. Hector McPhie purchased the property in 1949 and carried out renovations, including the subdivision of a bedroom into bathrooms. Westbrook was run as a dairy and stud farm until 1954 when it was sold again and further subdivided. In 1966 the house was divided to run as two separate households, so that two new kitchens were built into the original verandahs at the rear at this time. In 1969 the kitchen building contained three rooms; a large kitchen with a chimney that extended out from the wall, a pantry and a servant's room. This building was renovated as guest quarters soon afterwards, when two more rooms were created, the chimney was rebuilt and a carport was added to the side. In 1981 the property was sold and ran as a guesthouse. During this period the slab and stone sheds and stables were demolished.

Westbrook is now on 23 hectares of land and was purchased by the current owners in 1999.

== Description ==
Westbrook Homestead comprises two single storey stone buildings set on a slight rise above Westbrook Creek.

The main house is rectangular in plan and is constructed of Toowoomba basalt in rough dressed coursed blocks. The exterior walls are very thick, being double, with a rubble fill, and have rendered brick quoining. The roof is hipped with a central valley and is clad in English slate and corrugated iron sheeting. The building is surrounded by a wide verandah with a separate concave roof of corrugated iron supported on timber posts. Wide sandstone steps at the front and sides of the house approach the verandah and the majority of rooms still have access to this verandah through French doors. On the rear verandah, several utility rooms have been formed by enclosing sections with timber walls and sliding glass doors. The verandah floor to the front and sides are timber, while that at the rear is concrete. Attached to the northwest wall of the house is a timber bathroom annexe.

The house has five double brick chimneys with cedar or marble fireplaces. The interior has plastered walls and timber ceilings, with extensive cedar joinery.

The former detached kitchen is a rectangular building to the rear of the house and is also constructed of basalt with brick quoins. It has a hipped roof clad in corrugated iron and there is an open carport on the southern side. Sections of the north and west walls have been extensively reconstructed using bricks. The brick chimney and fireplace have also been reconstructed. Inside there are five rooms, which have rendered walls and timber ceilings as in the main house. The entrance is on the western side, which was once sheltered by a verandah.

The gardens retain terracing and traces of a circular drive. There are some mature plantings including large bunya trees. The site of the oval and building foundations are located to the north west of the house.

== Heritage listing ==
Westbrook Homestead was listed on the Queensland Heritage Register on 21 October 1992 having satisfied the following criteria.

The place is important in demonstrating the evolution or pattern of Queensland's history.

In 1841, John "Tinker" Campbell was one of the first squatters to settle on the Darling Downs; taking up a large run he named Westbrook. Subsequent owners built a substantial homestead at Westbrook in 1867 following a period of considerable prosperity. Westbrook Homestead illustrates the pattern of early European exploration and settlement of Queensland where the development of pastoral properties preceded agriculture and the establishment of towns. As an early homestead on the Darling Downs, it has associations with the development of the pastoral industry in Queensland.

The place demonstrates rare, uncommon or endangered aspects of Queensland's cultural heritage.

Westbrook Homestead is uncommon as an early grand homestead and detached kitchen constructed of locally quarried bluestone.

The place has potential to yield information that will contribute to an understanding of Queensland's history.

Westbrook Homestead and its grounds, on which other buildings once stood, have the potential to reveal information about the history of one of the earliest pastoral stations in Queensland. It has aesthetic significance as a well designed and constructed homestead residence that is pleasing in form, materials and detail.

The place has a strong or special association with a particular community or cultural group for social, cultural or spiritual reasons.

Westbrook Homestead has special associations with the community as the residence of one of the earliest pastoral stations established on the Darling Downs.

The place has a special association with the life or work of a particular person, group or organisation of importance in Queensland's history.

Westbrook Homestead has associations with the life and work of its early owners who were important in the establishment of the pastoral industry on the Downs, including John "Tinker" Campbell who established the station; Henry Hughes who, after returning to England, lobbied for the separation of Qld from NSW; the homestead builders, John Donald McLean, also a politician and Colonial Treasurer in 1866 and William Beit, who was a founding committee member of the Darling Downs Agricultural Society.
