= Henry Hughes (New South Wales politician) =

Australian politician

Henry Hughes was an Australian pastoralist and politician.

He was an appointed member of the New South Wales Legislative Council from 1851 to 1853.

Hughes was a squatter and large landowner and stockholder at Gowrie Station on the Darling Downs, in what is now Queensland. He was reported to have been one of the first white colonists in the area. He was appointed a magistrate there in 1846. In 1848, along with a colleague, Isaac, he purchased "Westbrook" in addition to his existing landholding; it was transferred to him alone in 1850.

In 1851, prior to his appointment, he was an unsuccessful candidate for the elected Brisbane-based Stanley Boroughs seat in the Legislative Council, in which he had variously been referred as the "pro-transportation" or "squatting" candidate. He had strongly advocated the importation of convicts into Moreton Bay, having gone so far as to travel to England to wait upon the Secretary of State for the Colonies. He was an "unflinching advocate" of the Separation of Queensland. He was reported to be opposed to the importation of Chinese labour, and to have never employed "Chinamen" on his property.

He resigned from the Legislative Council in 1853. In April 1853, it was reported that he had sold "Westbrook" to John Donald McLean and was intending to leave for England in the following year, with it uncertain as to whether he would return. In 1858, he was reported to have been one of a number of Queensland figures in London lobbying the English government for separation from New South Wales.
