= 1866 West Moreton colonial by-election =

The 1866 West Moreton colonial by-election was a by-election held on 11 September 1866 in the electoral district of West Moreton for the Queensland Legislative Assembly.

== History ==
On 7 August 1866, the Premier of Queensland and member for West Moreton, Robert Herbert, resigned. Joseph Fleming won the resulting by-election on 11 September 1866.

== See also ==
- Members of the Queensland Legislative Assembly, 1863–1867
