= Westbrook War Memorial =

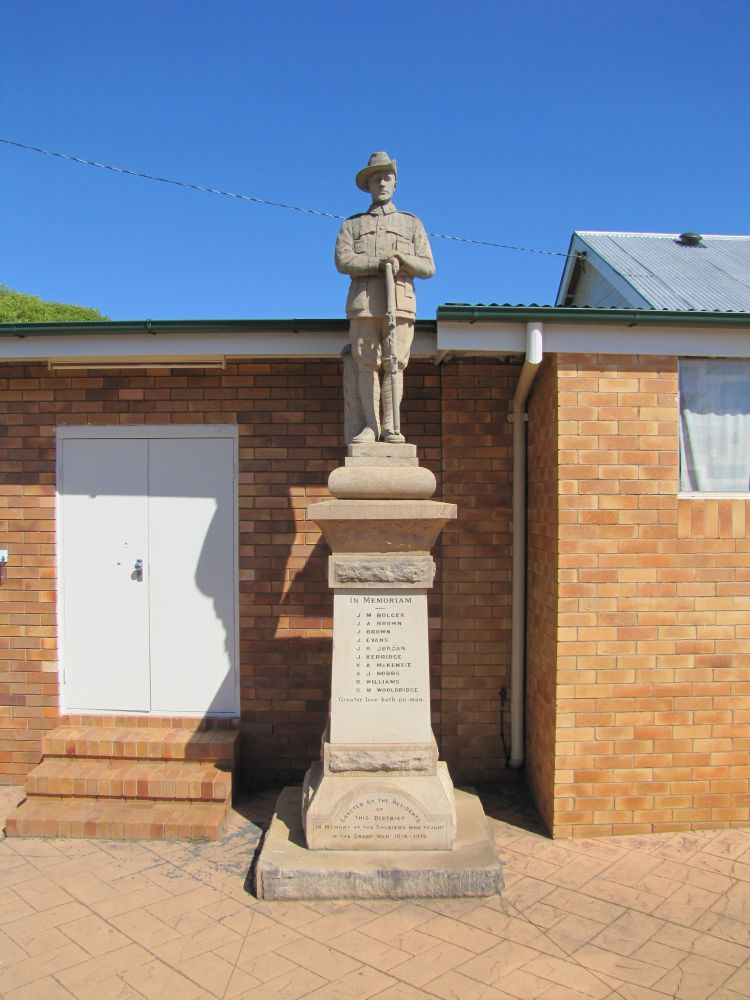

- Location within Queensland Location within Australia
- 27.6094°S 151.8667°E
- Location: 114 Toowoomba Road, Westbrook, Toowoomba Region, Queensland, Australia

History
- Design period: 1919–1930s (interwar period)
- Built: 1922–1922

Site notes
- Architect: Bruce Brothers
- Architectural style: Eclectic

Queensland Heritage Register
- Official name: Westbrook War Memorial
- Type: state heritage (built)
- Designated: 21 October 1992
- Reference no.: 600637
- Significant period: 1922- (social); 1922 (historical, fabric)
- Significant components: memorial – soldier statue, hall – public
- Builders: Bruce Brothers

Westbrook War Memorial is a heritage-listed memorial at 114 Toowoomba Road, Westbrook, Toowoomba Region, Queensland, Australia. It was constructed in 1922 by Toowoomba masonry firm Bruce Brothers, and lies adjacent to the Westbrook Public Hall, which it predates. It stands 4.2 metres (14 ft) high, and consists of a statue of a digger atop a sandstone pedestal and base. The memorial contains the names of the 10 local men who died during World War I on the front face, and the 37 who served on the side faces. It was added to the Queensland Heritage Register on 21 October 1992.

== History ==
The Westbrook War Memorial was unveiled Anzac Day 1922 by local MP, the Hon Littleton Groom. It was designed and executed by Bruce Brothers (successors of Walter Bruce) of Toowoomba, The memorial was erected by the residents of the district. It honours the 47 local men who served in the First World War, including the 10 fallen.

About half of the families listed are represented by more than one member, two families by four members, indicating the impact of the war upon the small community.

The town of Westbrook is located on the Darling Downs. The first white settlers arrived on the Downs in search of rich grazing land and by the 1840s, led by the Leslie brothers and John Campbell had established over twenty stations. Westbrook was the site of John Campbell's run. These stations prospered until their expansion was curbed due to the pressures of selection legislation and land was resumed for agricultural use. The area, which had previously been a primary producer of wool, diversified into wheat and dairy farming. By the 1920s, wheat had become the primary crop with state experimental farms located at Westbrook and other places providing the area with superior varieties of wheat.

Australia, and Queensland in particular, had few civic monuments before the First World War. The memorials erected in its wake became our first national monuments, recording the devastating impact of the war on a young nation. Australia lost 60,000 from a population of about 4 million, representing one in five of those who served. No previous or subsequent war has made such an impact on the nation.

Even before the end of the war, memorials became a spontaneous and highly visible expression of national grief. To those who erected them, they were as sacred as grave sites, substitute graves for the Australians whose bodies lay in battlefield cemeteries in Europe and the Middle East. British policy decreed that the Empire war dead were to be buried where they fell. The word "cenotaph", commonly applied to war memorials at the time, literally means "empty tomb".

Australian war memorials are distinctive in that they commemorate not only the dead. Australians were proud that their first great national army, unlike other belligerent armies, was composed entirely of volunteers, men worthy of honour whether or not they made the supreme sacrifice. Many memorials honour all who served from a locality, not just the dead, providing valuable evidence of community involvement in the war. Such evidence is not readily obtainable from military records, or from state or national listings, where names are categorised alphabetically or by military unit.

Australian war memorials are also valuable evidence of imperial and national loyalties, at the time, not seen as conflicting; the skills of local stonemasons, metalworkers and architects; and of popular taste. In Queensland, the soldier statue was the popular choice of memorial, whereas the obelisk predominated in the southern states, possibly a reflection of Queensland's larger working-class population and a lesser involvement of architects.

Many of the First World War monuments have been updated to record local involvement in later conflicts, and some have fallen victim to unsympathetic re-location and repair.

Although there are many different types of memorials in Queensland, the digger statue is the most common. It was the most popular choice of communities responsible for erecting the memorials, embodying the ANZAC spirit and representing the qualities of the ideal Australian: loyalty, courage, youth, innocence and masculinity. The digger was a phenomenon peculiar to Queensland, perhaps due to the fact that other states had followed Britain's lead and established Advisory Boards made up of architects and artists, prior to the erection of war memorials. The digger statue was not highly regarded by artists and architects who were involved in the design of relatively few Queensland memorials.

Most statues were constructed by local masonry firms, although some were by artists or imported.

When first unveiled, the memorial stood in front of open fields however in recent years, a hall has been constructed around the memorial. Although executed by Bruce Brothers, it is thought that the statue was obtained from Batstone's of Brisbane. The pedestal was a standard design, also used by Bruce Brothers for war memorials at Dulacca (Queensland) and Amosfield (New South Wales).

== Description ==
The First World War Memorial is situated directly adjacent to the Westbrook Public Hall in a paved area. It faces the Toowoomba – Milleran Road; the main road between the two towns.

The memorial stands 4.2 metres (14 ft) high and comprises a pedestal surmounted by a digger statue.

The memorial sits on a rock-faced, stepped sandstone base which bears a dedicatory inscription. Surmounting this is the slightly tapered pedestal, which is of smooth faced white sandstone. It bears the cut and blackened names of the ten local men who died during the First World War on the front face and the 37 who served on the side faces.

Above this is a sandstone capital comprising a rough hewn vertical face, margined and chiselled, which culminates in a concave cornice, also rough hewn.

Surmounting the capital is a large smooth-faced torus moulding, square in plan and a stepped base on which the digger statue stands.

The life-sized digger statue stands with head erect and hands resting on top of a reversed rifle which sits on top of his left boot. A tree stump is located behind the right leg for support.

== Heritage listing ==
Westbrook War Memorial was listed on the Queensland Heritage Register on 21 October 1992 having satisfied the following criteria.

The place is important in demonstrating the evolution or pattern of Queensland's history.

War Memorials are important in demonstrating the pattern of Queensland's history as they are representative of a recurrent theme that involved most communities throughout the state. They provide evidence of an era of widespread Australian patriotism and nationalism, particularly during and following the First World War.

The place is important in demonstrating the principal characteristics of a particular class of cultural places.

The monuments manifest a unique documentary record and are demonstrative of popular taste in the inter-war period.

Unveiled in 1922, the memorial at Westbrook demonstrates the principal characteristics of a commemorative structure erected as an enduring record of a major historical event. This is achieved through the use of appropriate materials and design elements. As a digger statue it is representative of the most popular form of memorial in Queensland and is of aesthetic significance for its high level of workmanship and design.

The place is important because of its aesthetic significance.

As a digger statue it is representative of the most popular form of memorial in Queensland and is of aesthetic significance for its high level of workmanship and design.

The place has a strong or special association with a particular community or cultural group for social, cultural or spiritual reasons.

The memorial has a strong association with the community as evidence of the impact of a major historic event and also with Toowoomba masonry firm, Bruce Brothers as an example of their work.

The place has a special association with the life or work of a particular person, group or organisation of importance in Queensland's history.

The memorial has a strong association with the community as evidence of the impact of a major historic event and also with Toowoomba masonry firm, Bruce Brothers as an example of their work.
