= Alfred Broughton (Australian politician) =

Australian politician

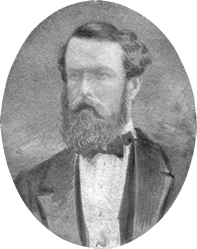

Member of the Queensland Legislative Assembly for West Moreton
- In office 3 May 1860 – 10 December 1860 Serving with George Thorn (senior), William Nelson, Joseph Fleming
- Preceded by: New seat
- Succeeded by: Henry Challinor

Personal details
- Born: Alfred Delves Broughton; 20 November 1826 England
- Died: 10 March 1895 (aged 68) Chertsey, Surrey, England
- Spouse: Clemence La Monnerie dit Fattorini
- Relations: Ernest Broughton (son)
- Occupation: Stock agent, police magistrate

Alfred Delves Broughton (20 November 1826 – 10 March 1895) was a politician in Queensland, Australia. He was a Member of the Queensland Legislative Assembly.

== Early life ==
Alfred Delves Broughton was born on 20 November 1826 in England, the 15th of 18 children of Sir Henry Broughton and his wife Mary (née Pigott).

On 16 March 1858 Broughton married Clemence La Monnerie dit Fattorini at St James' Church, Sydney, New South Wales. The couple had 2 sons and 2 daughters:

- Vernon Lamonnerie Delves (1859—1935)
- Dora Ethelind Lamonnerie (1861—1864)
- Mary Clemence (1862— )
- Ernest Clement Vernon (1865—1917)

Broughton was an agent and public servant.

== Politics ==
Alfred Boughton entered the Queensland Legislative Assembly on 3 May 1860 when he was elected as the member to represent the electoral district of West Moreton in the 1860 colonial election for the first Parliament of Queensland after separation from New South Wales in 1859. He resigned the seat on 21 December 1860 so that he could take up the position of police magistrate in Drayton. Henry Challinor won the resulting by-election on 12 January 1861.

== Civic life ==
His Excellency the Governor of Queensland appointed by commission, under his hand and seal, Alfred Delves Broughton, Esq.to be Captain of the Cavalry of the Queensland Volunteer Rifle Corps on 26 May 1860.

== Later life ==
Having married secondly Mary Florence Louisa Rosenzweig, by whom he had issue including a son and namesake, Alfred (born 1891), educated at Gonville and Caius College, Cambridge, Broughton died on 10 March 1895 in Surrey, England.

== See also ==
- Members of the Queensland Legislative Assembly, 1860–1863

Parliament of Queensland
New seat	Member for West Moreton; 1860; Served alongside: George Thorn (senior), William Nelson, Joseph Fleming	Succeeded by Henry Challinor
