= William Drayton Armstrong =

Australian politician

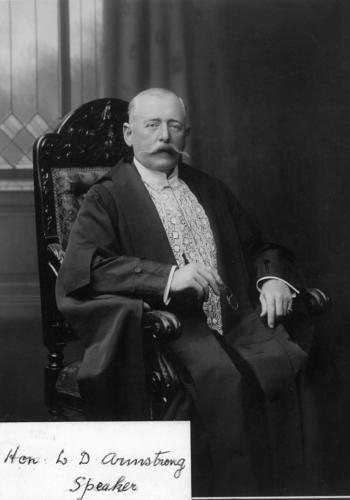

Speaker of the Queensland Legislative Assembly
- In office 11 July 1911 – 15 April 1915
- Preceded by: Joshua Thomas Bell
- Succeeded by: William McCormack
- Constituency: Lockyer

Member of the Queensland Legislative Assembly for Lockyer
- In office 13 May 1893 – 27 August 1904
- Preceded by: William North
- Succeeded by: Michael O'Keefe
- In office 18 May 1907 – 16 March 1918
- Preceded by: Michael O'Keefe
- Succeeded by: Cuthbert Butler

Personal details
- Born: 28 March 1862 Drayton, Colony of Queensland
- Died: 2 June 1936 (aged 74) Gatton, Queensland, Australia
- Party: Queensland Liberal
- Other political affiliations: Opposition, Ministerial
- Occupation: Station manager

William Drayton Armstrong (28 March 1862 – 2 June 1936) was an Australian politician. He was a member of the Queensland Legislative Assembly from 1893 to 1904 and from 1907 to 1918, representing the electorate of Lockyer. He was Speaker of the Queensland Legislative Assembly from 1911 to 1915.

== Early life ==
Armstrong was born at Drayton. Armstrong owned a pastoral property called Adare, which was one of the Lockyer Valley's largest cattle properties of the 19th and 20th centuries, and had its homestead approximately seven kilometres north of Gatton on Adare Road. The modern locality of Adare takes its name from the property. Armstrong moved the original homestead from a site on the edge of Lake Clarendon in 1896. He was a Master of the Gatton Masonic Lodge.

== Politics ==
Armstrong was a chairman of the Tarampa Divisional Board.

He was first elected to the Legislative Assembly at the 1893 election. He was defeated at the 1904 election, but regained his seat at the 1907 election. He was Chairman of Committees from 1910 to 1911 and Speaker of the Legislative Assembly from 1911 until the conservative government's defeat by T. J. Ryan in 1915. He was described as "a typical country squire, perhaps the last of the squirearchy that had come down from earlier parliaments", with the Assembly under his speakership described as "stiff and formal". He lost his seat to Cuthbert Butler at the 1918 election.

== Later life ==
Armstrong never married. His nephew (son of his sister) William Vanneck, 5th Baron Huntingfield was Governor of Victoria from 1934 to 1939. He died from pneumonia at Adare in June 1936.

Parliament of Queensland
Preceded by William North	Member for Lockyer; 1893–1904	Succeeded by Michael O'Keefe
Preceded by Michael O'Keefe	Member for Lockyer; 1907–1918	Succeeded by Cuthbert Butler
