= Joseph Fleming (politician) =

Anglo-Australian pastoralist and politician

Joseph Fleming JP
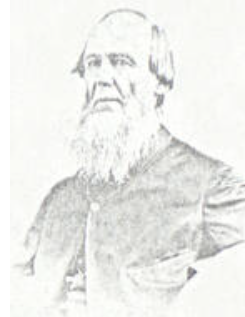

Member of the Queensland Legislative Assembly for West Moreton
- In office 9 July 1860 – 3 November 1862 Serving with Alfred Broughton, Henry Challinor, George Thorn (senior), Benjamin Cribb
- Preceded by: William Nelson
- Succeeded by: Joshua Peter Bell
- In office 11 September 1866 – 2 July 1867 Serving with Benjamin Cribb, Joshua Peter Bell
- Preceded by: Robert Herbert
- Succeeded by: George Thorn Jr.

Personal details
- Born: Joseph Fleming; 6 January 1811 Windsor, New South Wales, New South Wales, Australia
- Died: 23 September 1891 (aged 80) Ipswich, Queensland, Queensland, Australia
- Spouse(s): Phoebe McGinnis, (m.1831), Mary Harriet Everitt (m.1858)
- Occupation: Grazier

Joseph Fleming (6 January 1811 – 23 September 1891) was an Australian born pastoralist and politician who was a Member of the Queensland Legislative Assembly. He was an important pioneering figure in the British pastoral colonisation of the Gwydir River, Balonne River and Warrego River regions.

== Early life ==
Fleming was born in 1811 to parents Henry Fleming and Elizabeth Hall. The Halls and the Flemings were some of the first British families to take up land in the Hawkesbury River region of the British colony of New South Wales. Although Fleming's father was a significant landowner along the Hawkesbury, he also had many convictions for assault and liquor offences. Fleming's uncle was Thomas Simpson Hall, who was a notable squatter pastoralist in the northern regions of the colony.

Like his father, Fleming became a farmer and an innkeeper, and in 1830 he received a grant of land along the Macdonald River to the north of the Hawkesbury. In 1831, he married Phoebe McGinnis. In 1836, he joined the police force as a constable at Windsor, New South Wales, but was dismissed within a year.

== Squatter, grazier and chief constable ==
Fleming was very close to his uncle, Thomas Simpson Hall, they being of similar age and having married sisters of the same McGinnis family. Hall had been instrumental in establishing the Hall family's Dartbrook and Gundebri properties in the Upper Hunter River region. In the mid-1830s, Hall with the help of Fleming, expanded his family's pastoral assets by appropriating large segments of land along the upper Namoi River at Cuerindi and Mundowey, near the modern day town of Manilla.

In 1837, Fleming with his brother John Henry Fleming, took up land on the Mehi River naming their run 'Mungie Bundie'. Hall, continuing his close association with Fleming, took up a neighbouring run which he called 'Weebollabolla'. These holdings were located only a few miles from what is now the modern day town of Moree. Brutal frontier conflict with the local Gamilaraay people around 'Mungie Bundie' followed their arrival. Fleming left his brother John in charge of the run, who became well known for conducting armed raids against "the blacks", and was the leader of the gang that, in 1838, perpetrated the Myall Creek massacre. John was able to avoid arrest by fleeing the region but one of Fleming's 'Mungie Bundie' stockmen who participated in the massacre, Edward Foley, was later hanged for his involvement in the crime.

Despite the massacre, Joseph Fleming was able to maintain his pastoral interests in the area. In 1839, he led a group in the capture of bushranger "Gentleman Dick" and his gang, who had attempted to shoot Fleming and rob his 'Mungie Bundie' station. He soon after returned to the Hawkesbury region where he was appointed to the role of district chief constable of the police force even though his brother was still a high-profile wanted felon. He remained with the police until 1848, being the chief constable at Wollombi and then Molong.

In 1848, Fleming again linked up with his uncle Thomas Simpson Hall to establish new pastoral interests on the frontiers of the colony. This time they drove thousands of head of cattle to the upper Balonne River where Fleming formed the Talavera run, with Hall establishing the neighbouring runs of Surat, Colgoon, Yamboucal and Weribone.

At Talavera, Aboriginal resistance was fierce and while establishing the run, Fleming and his men had a large battle with the local Mandandanji people killing around fifty of them. This battle led to the name Talavera being chosen for his property, after the famous Battle of Talavera fought during the Peninsular War. Fleming and Hall had to maintain a private force of 12 men to fight "against native blacks". In the early 1850s, their managers on these properties, James Norman, Dick Walker and D.W. Duncomb, participated in further killings of Aboriginal people including large massacres at Yamboucal and Donga Creek where troopers of the Native Police were utilised. By 1851, Fleming and Hall had taken possession of hundreds of thousands of acres of land along the Balonne River, from Donga Creek through to Yuleba and Bungil Creeks.

== Steam mill at Ipswich ==
In 1850, Fleming expanded his business interests to include the establishment of a steam mill on the Bremer River at Ipswich. He utilised this steam mill as a sawmill, a boiling down works and a flour mill. He also became a partner in the steamship Bremer which traded between Ipswich and Brisbane.

During this time, his first wife died in childbirth in 1853 and he married his second wife, Mary Everitt, in 1858. He abandoned Everitt in 1862 and she was forced into poverty, having to live in a tent.

== Politics, court cases and insolvency ==
On 22 June 1860, William Nelson, one of the three members for West Moreton, was unseated by petition. Joseph Fleming was elected to the first Queensland Legislative Assembly in the resulting by-election on 9 July 1860. Fleming held the seat until he resigned on 3 November 1862 when he became bankrupt. Joshua Peter Bell won the resulting by-election on 15 December 1862.

Fleming's financial difficulties were largely a result of a protracted court case with William Tooth over the sale of the Talavera property which eventually saw Tooth taking ownership of most of Fleming's land acquisitions by 1861. Fleming's situation was further complicated with another legal case over properties that he allegedly owned on the Warrego River.

In early 1862, Fleming's station manager James Norman appropriated new land on the Warrego, which he called the Yo Yo and Burenda properties around the modern day town of Augathella. When Fleming became insolvent a few months later, bank officials attempted to repossess these properties, however Fleming's business manager and probable mistress, Adeline Dollman, resisted this action, calling in the local Native Police to arrest the bank's representative for trespass. Dollman appears to have had a close relationship with the local Native Police detachment, who although initially were defeated in battles with the local Aboriginal people, were later able to punish them after a barracks was established at Yo Yo.

A lengthy court battle ensued in which it was found that Dollman was the legal owner of Yo Yo and Burenda, not Fleming, and the repossession was therefore unlawful. Although this case was a victory for Fleming, it did not improve his financial situation and he remained a undischarged bankrupt for the amount of £29,132. The banks eventually did repossess Yo Yo and Burenda in 1868 when Dollman died.

Fleming returned to politics on 7 August 1866, when the Premier of Queensland and member for West Moreton, Robert Herbert, resigned. Joseph Fleming won the resulting by-election on 11 September 1866. He held the seat until 2 July 1867 (the 1867 election) when he was defeated by Joshua Peter Bell (sitting member), Patrick O'Sullivan and George Thorn.

== Later life ==
After his second political defeat in 1867, Fleming retired from public life and became a storekeeper and railway employee in Ipswich and Roma.

== Death ==
Fleming died at Ipswich in 1891. In 2017 a crypt in an unmarked section of Ipswich General Cemetery was found to contain the remains of Fleming and his wife Phoebe. The crypt was located in the 1990s and sealed over at the time to prevent vandalism. In October 2018 the crypt was excavated by archaeologists and students from the University of Southern Queensland. The remains of Fleming, and his wife and daughter, were ceremoniously re-interred in the presence of his descendants in 2019.

== See also ==
- Members of the Queensland Legislative Assembly, 1860–1863; 1863-1867

Parliament of Queensland
Preceded by William Nelson	Member for West Moreton; 1860–1862; Served alongside: Alfred Broughton, Henry Challinor, George Thorn (senior), Benjamin Cribb	Succeeded by Joshua Peter Bell
Preceded by Robert Herbert	Member for West Moreton; 1866–1867; Served alongside: Benjamin Cribb, Joshua Peter Bell	Succeeded by George Thorn Jr.
