= Wilfred Adams Russell =

Australian politician (1874–1932)

Wilfred Russell
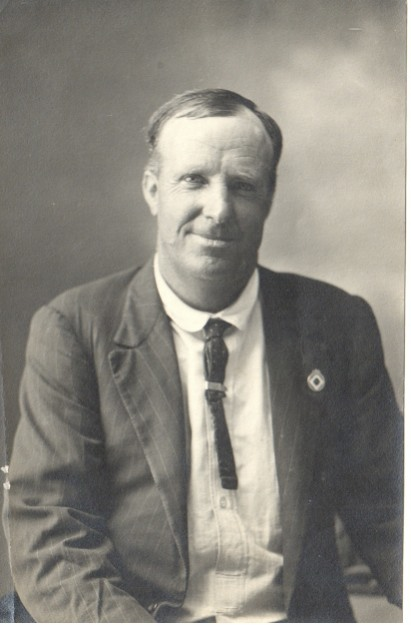

Member of the Queensland Legislative Assembly for Dalby
- In office 8 May 1926 – 8 January 1932 (died in office)
- Preceded by: William Vowles
- Succeeded by: Walter Sparkes

Personal details
- Born: Wilfred Adams Russell; 22 July 1874 Rockhampton, Queensland, Australia
- Died: 8 January 1932 (aged 57) Sydney, New South Wales, Australia
- Party: Country and Progressive National Party
- Spouse: Millicent Baldwin†
- Relations: Charles Russell (son) David Russell (grandson) Russell Cooper (grandson)
- Education: Hawkesbury Agricultural College
- Profession: Grazier, Politician

Wilfred Adams Russell (22 July 1874 – 8 January 1932), was an Australian politician. He was a Member of the Queensland Legislative Assembly.

== Early life and education ==
Russell was born in Queensland in 1874 and educated in New South Wales, where he later acquired pastoral and agricultural interests.

== Pastoralism ==
In 1909 he acquired an interest in Dalmally Station near Roma and took up residence there in 1910. He further extended his pastoral interests with the acquisition of properties at Cunnamulla and Jimbour Station. Jimbour was purchased from Charles Wippell in 1923. Title was transferred to Russell in January 1925. He pioneered the use of motorised livestock transport in the 1920s.

== Politics ==
Like the Bells before him, Russell of Jimbour became involved in local politics. He served as an alderman of the Dalby Town council and as the member for Dalby in the Queensland Legislative Assembly from 1926 until his death in 1932. In 1927 he donated part of the Bunya Mountains National Park to the community. In 1931 he was involved in the acquisition of part of Lake Broadwater as a national park.

== Family ==
Russell was married to Millicent Baldwin of Tamworth. They had five children, 2 sons and 3 daughters. Muriel, Joan, Henry, Charles and Eileen.

Parliament of Queensland
Preceded by William Vowles	Member for Dalby; 1926 – 1932	Succeeded by Walter Sparkes
