= George Thorn (senior) =

Australian politician

George Thorn Sr.
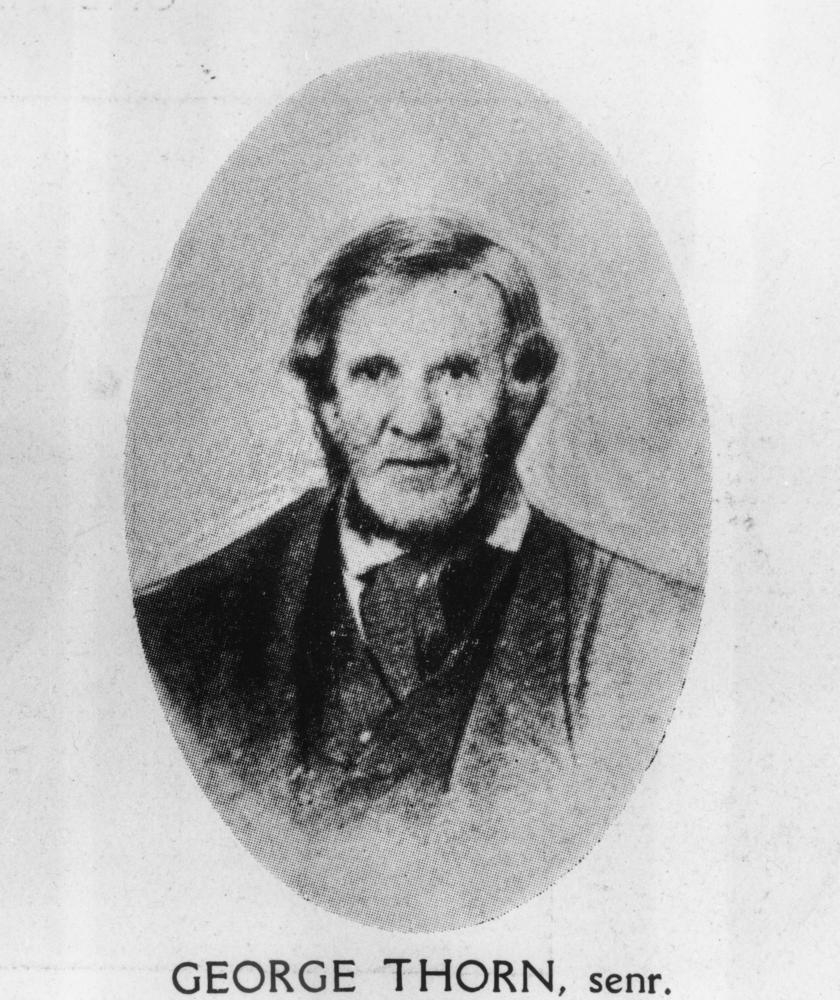

Member of the Queensland Legislative Assembly for West Moreton
- In office 3 May 1860 – 3 April 1861 Serving with Alfred Broughton, Henry Challinor, William Nelson, Joseph Fleming
- Preceded by: New seat
- Succeeded by: Benjamin Cribb

Personal details
- Born: George Thorn; 11 April 1806 Stockbridge, Hampshire, England
- Died: 28 April 1876 (aged 70) Ipswich, Queensland, Australia
- Resting place: Ipswich General Cemetery
- Spouse: Jane Hancock
- Relations: George Thorn Jr. (son), John Thorn (son), Henry Thorn (son), William Thorn (son), George Harris (son-in-law), Richard Gardiner Casey (son-in-law), Baron Casey (grandson)
- Occupation: Soldier, Hotelier

George Thorn (senior) (11 April 1806 – 28 April 1876) was a politician in Queensland, Australia. He was a Member of the Queensland Legislative Assembly. He was known as the "father of Ipswich" for his contributions to establishing that town.

== Early life ==
George Thorn was born on 11 April 1806 near Stockbridge, Hampshire, England, the son of farmer Simon Thorn and his wife Elizabeth.

Thorn enlisted in the 4th (Queen's own) Regiment, and after serving for some time in England and elsewhere, he emigrated c. 1833 to New South Wales, being at that time a non-commissioned offocer in his regiment. He first settled in Sydney, and having renounced his calling as a soldier, he entered the Town Survey Department where he formed the acquaintance of Sir Richard Bourke, the then Governor of New South Wales, and was present with Bourke at the first survey of Melbourne in March 1837. In June 1837, his regiment left for India, but Thorn decided to remain in Sydney, marrying the seventeen-year-old Jane Handcock on 2 November 1837. The couple had ten children:

- George Henry (1838–1905), Member of the Queensland Legislative Assembly and Premier of Queensland
- Henry (1840–1880), Member of the Queensland Legislative Assembly
- Jane (1843–1917)
- Charles (1844–1877)
- John (1847–1896), Member of the Queensland Legislative Assembly
- Joseph A. (1850–1883)
- William (1852–1935), Member of the Queensland Legislative Assembly
- Sarah Elizabeth (1855–)
- Albert Samuel Thorn (1857–1898)
- Ida Australia Thorn (1859–)

Four of his sons entered Queensland Parliament. His daughter Jane married George Harris, a Member of the Queensland Legislative Assembly, and their daughter Eveline married Richard Gardiner Casey, also a Member of the Queensland Legislative Assembly. The son of Eveline and Richard Casey was Richard Gavin Gardiner Casey, Governor-General of Australia.

Having quit the army in 1837, Thorn joined the Commissariat, and whilst holding office in the latter he was, in 1838, transferred to Moreton Bay. On arrival he immediately took up his residence in Ipswich, having been placed in charge of all the Government stock-cattle, sheep, and horses then located in the surrounding neighbourhood. He also had the supervision of a large area of land, under cultivation by the Government, at a place then designated the "Ploughed Station", but later known as "The Grange" and the racecourse. Here were successfully cultivated large fields of wheat (the first ever grown in the Queensland colony). Thorn faithfully discharged the duties of his office to the satisfaction of his superiors. During his whole career as Government superintendent, his subordinates (often convicts with wild and ungovernable temperaments) held him in high esteem. Thorn continued to hold the office of superintendent until Queensland became a free settlement, when he retired.

Thorn was offered a grant of land in the vicinity of Ipswich by Governor Bourke, which he refused, thinking that such a primitive and apparently worthless locality would never be any thing more than it then was, and that consequently the land would never be of any value. He subsequently built an hotel at the corner of Brisbane and East Streets, which was called the "Queen's Arms" (later the Claredon Hotel, destroyed by fire in 1874). After conducting this hotel for a few years, he turned his attention to the business of general storekeeper, building and opening a store in East Street.

In 1844, Thorn became owner of Normanby pastoral station, a tract of country about twenty miles from Ipswich (later managed by his sons John and Charles Thorn). Thorn succeeded in raising this station to a high standard, making it one of the most valuable pastoral properties in West Moreton. Here Thorn says he spent some of the best days of his life.

Prior to the separation of Queensland in 1859, Thorn and his family (all of whom are natives of Australia) paid a visit to England, and returned to the colony in the same steamer which brought out Sir George Bowen, the first Governor of Queensland.

== Politics ==
At the inaugural colonial election in 1860, Thorn was elected to the Queensland Legislative Assembly in the electoral district of West Moreton. He held the seat until 3 April 1861 when he resigned, feeling himself too old. Benjamin Cribb won the resulting by-election on 26 April 1861.

His parliamentary career, although brief, was nevertheless productive. He was a consistent and earnest advocate of people's rights and fought with an earnestness and consistency for what he considered just and right. While he was not eloquent, he did not try the patience of the Legislative Assembly with long-winded harangues nor pretended sincerity. He sought to eradicate evil when he saw it, and he denounced it with a bluntness which may probably have given offence to some, but which wes well received by the community. Among those in the first parliament, he was described as a "noble exception" who tried to achieve "the greatest good for the greatest number" and that he never sacrificed his principles for either friend or foe.

When the Borough of Ipswich was proclaimed as a municipality, Thorn was elected one of the aldermen. On the foundation of the Ipswich Grammar School he was chosen as one of its trustees.

== Later life ==
Thorn enjoyed excellent health in his later years. However, in December 1875, he fractured his femur bone, from which he never thoroughly recovered, dying from senile bronchitis on 28 April 1876 in Ipswich, Queensland. He was buried in the Anglican section of Ipswich General Cemetery.

== See also ==
- Members of the Queensland Legislative Assembly, 1860–1863

Parliament of Queensland
| New seat | Member for West Moreton; 1860–1861; Served alongside: Alfred Broughton, Henry Challinor, William Nelson, Joseph Fleming | Succeeded by Benjamin Cribb |
