= Joshua Thomas Bell =

Australian politician

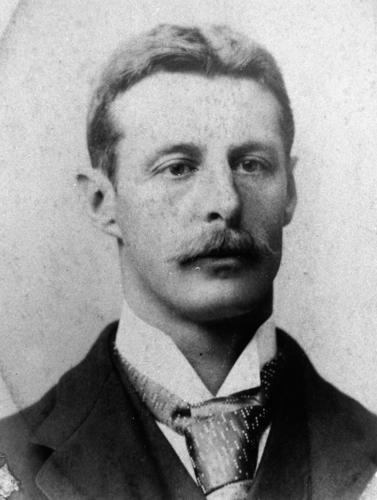

Speaker of the Queensland Legislative Assembly
- In office 29 June 1909 – 10 March 1911
- Preceded by: John Leahy
- Succeeded by: William Drayton Armstrong
- Constituency: Dalby

Member of the Queensland Legislative Assembly for Dalby
- In office 29 April 1893 – 10 March 1911
- Preceded by: John Jessop
- Succeeded by: William Vowles

Personal details
- Born: 13 March 1863 Ipswich, Queensland, Australia
- Died: 10 March 1911 (aged 47) Brisbane, Queensland, Australia
- Resting place: Toowong Cemetery
- Party: Liberals
- Other political affiliations: Kidstonites, Ministerial
- Spouse: Catherine Jane Ferguson (m.1903 d.1943)
- Relations: Sir Joshua Peter Bell (father), John Ferguson (father-in-law), John Alexander Bell (uncle)
- Education: Trinity Hall, Cambridge
- Occupation: Barrister

Joshua Thomas Bell (13 March 1863 – 10 March 1911) was an Australian barrister and politician.

Bell was the son of Sir Joshua Peter Bell, and his wife Margaret Miller, née Dorsey and was born in Ipswich, Queensland. Bell was educated at Brisbane Grammar School and Trinity Hall, Cambridge. He was president of the Cambridge Union.

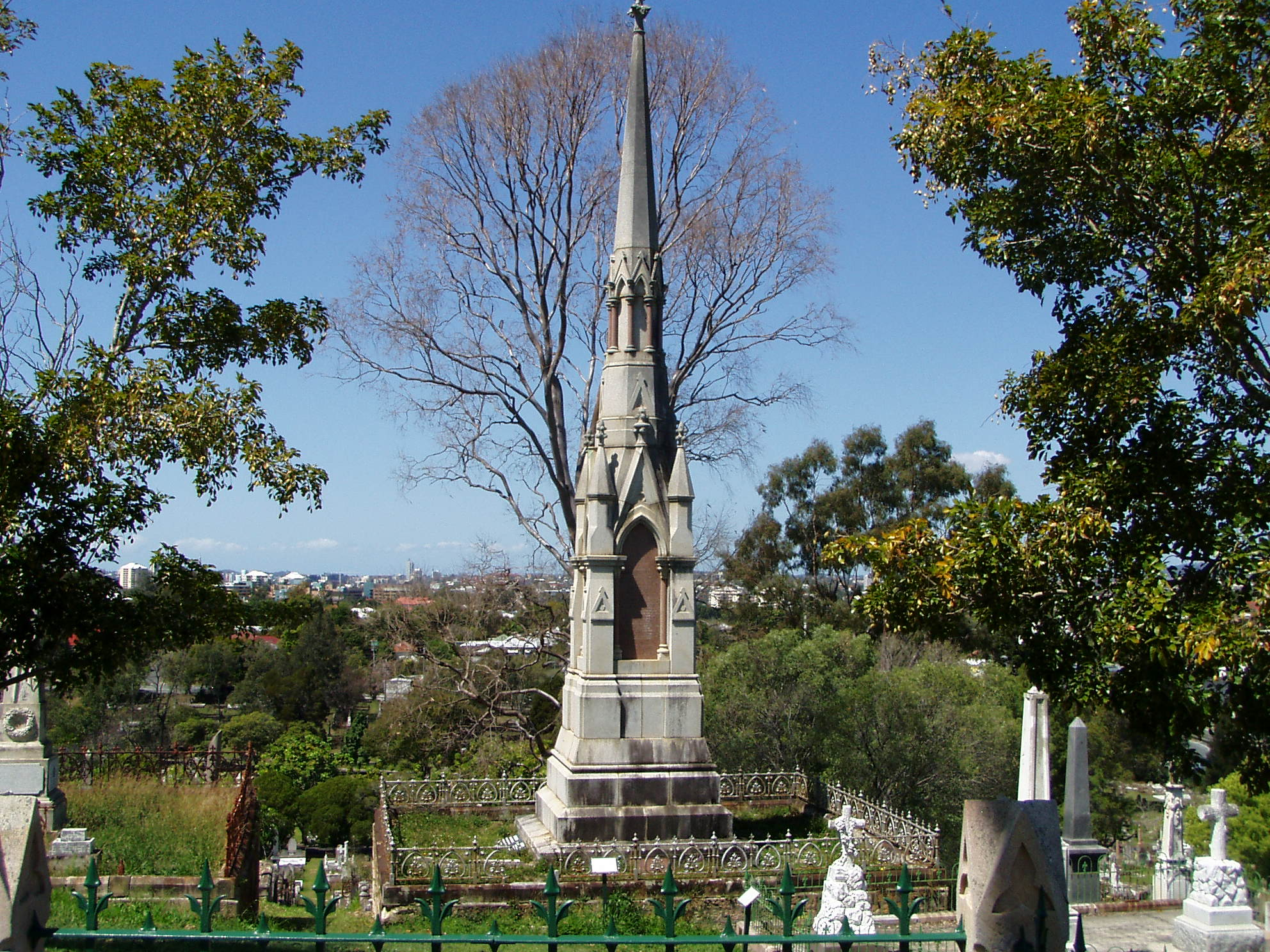
Monument at the grave of Joshua Thomas Bell.

Bell was admitted to practice as a lawyer in England and was a marshal on the Northern Assizes circuit in 1888. In 1889 Bell returned to Australia where he became the private secretary of the judge Sir Samuel Griffith. In 1893 Bell became a member of the Legislative Assembly of Queensland for the electoral district of Dalby in which his family home, Jimbour Homestead, was located. He married the daughter of John Ferguson in 1903 and had two children.

In 1901, Bell unsuccessfully contested the federal seat of Darling Downs in Australia's first federal by-election, but he was defeated by Littleton Ernest Groom, the son of the original member.

Bell died at Rakeevan, his Graceville residence on 10 March 1911. Bell was accorded a state funeral which proceeded from St John's Anglican Cathedral to the Toowong Cemetery where he was buried next to his father.

== Bibliography ==
- D. B. Waterson, 'Bell, Joshua Thomas (1863 - 1911)', Australian Dictionary of Biography, Volume 7, Melbourne University Press, 1979, p. 258. Retrieved 6 July 2009
- Bell, Joshua Thomas — Brisbane City Council Grave Location Search

Parliament of Queensland
Preceded by John Leahy	Speaker of the Legislative Assembly; 1909 – 1911	Succeeded by William Drayton Armstrong
Preceded by John Jessop	Member for Dalby; 1893–1911	Succeeded by William Vowles
