= William Vowles =

Australian politician (1876–1943)

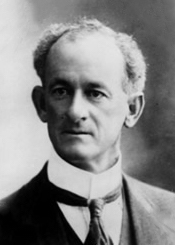

Leader of the Opposition of Queensland
- In office 28 January 1920 – 11 Jul 1923
- Preceded by: Edward Macartney
- Succeeded by: Charles Taylor

Member of the Queensland Legislative Assembly for Dalby
- In office 26 Apr 1911 – 8 May 1926
- Preceded by: Joshua Thomas Bell
- Succeeded by: Wilfred Russell

Personal details
- Born: William John Vowles; 22 April 1876 Enoggera, Queensland, Australia
- Died: 28 August 1943 (aged 67) Dalby, Queensland, Australia
- Resting place: Dalby Monumental Cemetery
- Party: Country Party
- Other political affiliations: Ministerial, Liberal Party, National
- Spouse: Grace Lyndley Black (m.1903 d.1953)
- Occupation: Solicitor

William John Vowles (22 April 1876 – 21 August 1943) was a solicitor and member of the Queensland Legislative Assembly.

== Biography ==
Vowles was born at Enoggera, Queensland, to parents George Vowles and his wife Georgina Maria Cecilia (née Kean) and studied at Ipswich Grammar and Brisbane Grammar Schools. His father, a State School teacher, was the first white child born in Ipswich. He started his legal career as an articled clerk with J.B. McGregor in Brisbane and, after being admitted to the bar, he moved to Dalby in 1899, where he set up his own practice.

Once he arrived in Dalby he realized he was the only solicitor in the town but soon after his arrival two other solicitors commenced practice there as well. Over time, though, these solicitors left the town and, once again, Vowles was by himself until 1906. He was interested in the public affairs of Dalby and was a member of several clubs and was also on the hospitals' board for forty years.

On December 1, 1903 he married Grace Lyndley Black (died 1953) and together had three sons and three daughters. He had been in failing health for the last two years of his life and in 1943, he suffered a severe heart attack the night before he died. He did not attend his office the next day and was resting in bed when he suffered another heart attack, this time fatal. He was buried in the Dalby Monumental Cemetery.

== Political career ==
Vowles first started in politics as an alderman on the Dalby Town Council in 1900, becoming the mayor in 1907 until 1909. He resigned from the council when he became opposition leader in the state parliament, but he resumed as an alderman after he lost his seat after in 1926.

Vowles' first attempt at entering the Queensland Parliament came at the 1908 state election when Vowles, representing the Ministerialist Party, stood against Joshua Thomas Bell for the seat of Dalby. He was well beaten, but in 1911 Bell died and this time Vowles won the resulting by-election.

Vowles held the seat of Dalby for the next fifteen years. In that time he was opposition leader from January 1920 until July 1923. At the 1926 state election, he lost his seat to Wilfred Russell, the Primary Producers Candidate.

On 28 June 1920, following a meeting of the fourteen members of Parliament representing the country constituencies of Queensland, Vowles announced that a majority had voted to form a Country Party in the State House. It was later revealed that Vowles was in the minority that voted against the measure.

Political offices
Preceded by Edward Macartney	Leader of the Opposition of Queensland; 1920–1923	Succeeded by Charles Taylor
Parliament of Queensland
Preceded by Joshua Thomas Bell	Member for Dalby; 1911–1926	Succeeded by Wilfred Russell
