= George Simpson (Queensland politician) =

Australian politician

Member of the Queensland Legislative Assembly for Dalby
- In office 15 November 1878 – 20 January 1882
- Preceded by: Joshua Peter Bell
- Succeeded by: John Jessop

Personal details
- Born: George Morris Simpson; 7 May 1840 Sydney, Australia
- Died: 22 August 1919 (aged 79) Sydney, Australia
- Resting place: Waverley Cemetery
- Spouse: Emily Ellen Vaughan Jenkins (m.1875 d.1930)
- Occupation: Petroleum industry

George Morris Simpson (7 May 1840 – 22 August 1919) was an Australian politician.

He was born in Sydney to George Thorant Simpson, an accountant, and Ruth Francis. Brought up by long-serving New South Wales politician Sir John Hay, he attended Sydney Grammar School before moving to Queensland to farm. On 10 November 1875 he married Emily Ellen Vaughan Jenkins, with whom he would have nine children. He was elected to the Queensland Legislative Assembly in 1878 as the member for Dalby, and he served until 1882. He was also a candidate for the New South Wales seat of New England at the first federal election.

Simpson died in 1919 in Sydney and was buried at Waverley Cemetery.

Parliament of Queensland
Preceded by Joshua Peter Bell	Member for Dalby; 1878–1882	Succeeded by John Jessop
