= Cuthbert Butler (politician) =

Australian politician (1889–1950)

Member of the Queensland Legislative Assembly for Lockyer
- In office 16 March 1918 – 7 October 1920
- Preceded by: William Drayton Armstrong
- Succeeded by: George Logan

Personal details
- Born: Robert Thomas Poxon; 20 April 1889 Pembury, Kent, England
- Died: 8 November 1950 (aged 61) Hornsby, New South Wales, Australia
- Party: Labor
- Spouse: Rosa May Beaven (m.1910 d.1972)
- Occupation: Tailor, Librarian, Minister of religion

Robert John Cuthbert Butler (born Robert Thomas Poxon; 20 April 1889 – 8 November 1950) was an Australian politician. He was the Labor member for Lockyer in the Legislative Assembly of Queensland from 1918 to 1920.

== Early life ==
Butler was born on 20 April 1889 in Pembury, Kent, England. He was the third of seven children born to of Emma (née Batchelor) and John Albert Poxon. His father was a tenant farmer who grew hops, but moved the family to Canterbury after being bankrupted in 1896 and worked as a baker.

Butler is recorded on the 1911 UK census as a tailor living with his parents. However, by the end of the year he had moved to London, where he changed his surname from "Poxon" and reinvented himself as a 28-year-old journalist rather than a 22-year-old apprentice tailor. Butler left England in December 1911 and worked his way to Australia on a steamer. He worked at the Catherine Hill coal mine in New South Wales, where he participated in a strike, before moving to Brisbane in 1914. He became a librarian at the Queensland Museum in September 1915.

== Queensland ==
At the 1915 Queensland state election, Butler unsuccessfully stood for the Australian Labor Party (ALP) in the seat of Toombul. During World War I he became known as an "advocate of radical views on peace, conscription and civil liberties".

== Western Australia ==
In 1925, Butler moved to Perth to work with the local temperance movement. He continued his work as a lay preacher and in 1931 became the minister of the Augustine Congregational Church in Bunbury, although he was never ordained. During the Great Depression he was secretary of the Unemployed Workers' Movement and vice-president of the Relief and Sustenance Worker's Union.

Butler became involved in the social credit movement, becoming a country vice-president of the Douglas Social Credit Movement in 1933 and paid secretary the following year. He stood unsuccessfully for the Western Australian Legislative Council in 1934.

== Personal life ==
Butler married Rosa May Beaven in 1911, with whom he had four sons. He died in 1950 and was cremated at the Northern Suburbs Crematorium, Sydney.

Parliament of Queensland
Preceded by William Drayton Armstrong	Member for Lockyer; 1918–1920	Succeeded by George Logan
