= Electoral district of Dalby =

Coordinates: 27.184°S 151.262°E

Dalby Queensland—Legislative Assembly
- State: Queensland
- Created: 1873
- Abolished: 1949
- Namesake: Dalby, Queensland

Dalby was an electoral district of the Legislative Assembly in the Australian state of Queensland. It existed from 1873 to 1949 and centred on the town of Dalby.

== Members for Dalby ==
Member	Party	Term
Joshua Peter Bell	Unaligned	1873–1878
George Simpson	Unaligned	1878–1882
John Jessop	Unaligned	1882–1893
Joshua Thomas Bell	Ministerialist	1893–1911
William Vowles	Ministerialist/Liberal/National/Country	1911–1926
Wilfred Adams Russell	PPC/Country	1926–1932
Jim Sparkes	Country	1932–1935
Godfrey Morgan	Country	1935–1938
Aubrey Slessar	Labor	1938–1947
Charles Russell	Country	1947–1949

== See also ==
- Electoral districts of Queensland
- Members of the Queensland Legislative Assembly by year
- Category:Members of the Queensland Legislative Assembly by name
