= George Logan (Australian politician) =

Australian politician

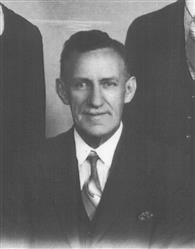

Member of the Queensland Legislative Assembly for Lockyer
- In office 9 October 1920 – 11 May 1929
- Preceded by: Cuthbert Butler
- Succeeded by: Charles Jamieson

Personal details
- Born: George Andrew Logan; 13 August 1884 Rosewood, Colony of Queensland
- Died: 25 November 1953 (aged 69) Kingaroy, Queensland, Australia
- Resting place: Taabinga Cemetery
- Party: Country and Progressive National Party
- Other party: Country Party
- Spouse: Ivy May Birtwhistle (m.1913)
- Occupation: Farmer

George Andrew Logan (13 August 1884 – 25 November 1953) was a member of the Queensland Legislative Assembly.

== Biography ==
Logan was born at Rosewood, Queensland, the son of Whitmore Logan and his wife Harriett (née Josey). He was educated in Ipswich and after leaving school worked as a farmer on the family estate at Mondure, near Murgon. After state politics, he worked for the Queensland Agricultural Bank.

On 18 October 1913 he married Ivy May Birtwhistle and together had a son and two daughters. Logan died in November 1953 in Kingaroy and his funeral proceeded from the Kingaroy Presbyterian Church to the Taabinga Cemetery.

== Public career ==
Logan, a member of the Country Party, won the seat of Lockyer at the 1920 Queensland state election, defeating the sitting Labor member, Cuthbert Butler. He represented the electorate until he was defeated by the independent, Charles Jamieson in 1929.

Parliament of Queensland
Preceded by Cuthbert Butler	Member for Lockyer; 1920–1929	Succeeded by Charles Jamieson
