= Electoral district of Lockyer =

State electoral district of Queensland, Australia

Lockyer Queensland—Legislative Assembly
- Map of the electoral district of Lockyer, 2017
- State: Queensland
- MP: Jim McDonald
- Party: Liberal National
- Namesake: Lockyer Valley
- Electors: 34,938 (2020)
- Area: 2,568 km^{2} (991.5 sq mi)
- Demographic: Rural
- Coordinates: 27°41′S 152°28′E
Electorates around Lockyer:
Condamine	Nanango	Moggill
Toowoomba North; Toowoomba South	Lockyer	Ipswich West
Condamine	Southern Downs	Scenic Rim

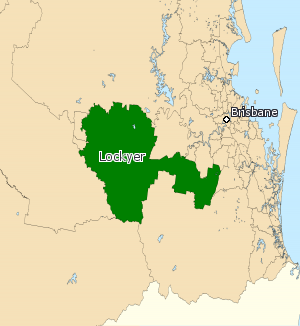
2008 map

Lockyer is an electoral district of the Legislative Assembly in the Australian state of Queensland.

The district consists primarily of Gatton and Laidley Shires and the northern parts of Beaudesert Shire. It includes the major town of Gatton and a number of smaller centres including Laidley, Helidon and Withcott. The eastern parts of the district are part of the outer southern suburbs of Ipswich and Brisbane in the area of Greenmount.

The district is bounded on the west by Toowoomba North, and Toowoomba South. On the southwest and south by Condamine, Southern Downs and Beaudesert. To the north and northwest by Nanango. To the northeast, where it passes south of Ipswich and Brisbane, it is bounded by Ipswich West, Ipswich, Moggill. To the east, it shares a boundary with the seat of Logan.

The electorate has been represented by Jim McDonald since the 2017 election. Pauline Hanson came within just 114 votes of being elected at the 2015 election with a 49.78 percent two-candidate vote.

Hanson's subsequent election to the Senate in 2016 precluded her from running in Lockyer again in 2017.

== Members for Lockyer ==
First incarnation (1888–1932)
Member	Party	Term
William North	Unaligned	1888–1893
William Drayton Armstrong	Various^{1}	1893–1904
Michael O'Keefe	Ministerialist	1904–1907
William Drayton Armstrong	Various^{1}	1907–1918
Cuthbert Butler	Labor	1918–1920
George Logan	Country	1920–1929
Charles Jamieson	Independent	1929–1932
Second incarnation (1950–present)
Member	Party	Term
(Sir) Gordon Chalk	Liberal	1950–1976
Tony Bourke	Liberal	1976–1980
Tony Fitzgerald	National	1980–1998
Peter Prenzler	One Nation	1998–1999
Peter Prenzler	City Country Alliance	1999–2001
Bill Flynn	One Nation	2001–2004
Ian Rickuss	National	2004–2008
Ian Rickuss	Liberal National	2008–2017
Jim McDonald	Liberal National	2017–present

^{1} William Drayton Armstrong alternately listed his party alignment as Liberal, Opposition, and Ministeralist (twice). The parliamentary members' register does not list dates for these changes.

== Election results ==
2024 Queensland state election: Lockyer
Party	Candidate	Votes	%	±%
Liberal National	Jim McDonald	17,909	52.74	+7.64
Labor	Euan Tiernan	6,758	19.90	−4.80
One Nation	Corey West	5,351	15.76	+2.46
Greens	Paul Toner	2,120	6.24	+1.34
Family First	Julie Rose	1,822	5.36	+5.36
Total formal votes		33,960	96.14	−0.38
Informal votes		1,363	3.86	+0.38
Turnout		35,323	89.40	−0.33
Two-party-preferred result
Liberal National	Jim McDonald	23,488	69.16	+7.56
Labor	Euan Tiernan	10,472	30.84	−7.56
Liberal National hold		Swing	+7.56	

2020 Queensland state election: Lockyer
Party	Candidate	Votes	%	±%
Liberal National	Jim McDonald	13,662	45.15	+9.33
Labor	Janet Butler	7,477	24.71	+1.81
One Nation	Corey West	4,010	13.25	−21.13
Independent	Jim Savage	3,057	10.10	+10.10
Greens	Rebecca Haley	1,489	4.92	+0.38
United Australia	Andrew Rockliff	563	1.86	+1.86
Total formal votes		30,258	96.52	+0.42
Informal votes		1,091	3.48	−0.42
Turnout		31,349	89.73	−0.11
Two-party-preferred result
Liberal National	Jim McDonald	18,616	61.52	−0.30
Labor	Janet Butler	11,642	38.48	+0.30
Liberal National hold		Swing	−0.30	
