= William Lambie Nelson =

Australian politician

The Rev. Dr William Nelson
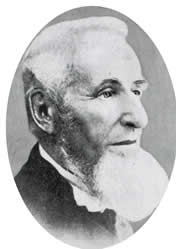

Member of the Queensland Legislative Assembly for West Moreton
- In office 3 May 1860 – 22 June 1860 Serving with Alfred Broughton, George Thorn (senior)
- Preceded by: New seat
- Succeeded by: Joseph Fleming

Personal details
- Born: William Lambie Nelson; 20 September 1808 Kilmarnock, Ayrshire, Scotland
- Died: 13 June 1887 (aged 78) Southport, Queensland, Australia
- Resting place: Southport General Cemetery
- Spouse(s): Agnes Muir (d.1885), Sarah Pring (m.1886)
- Relations: Hugh Nelson (son)
- Occupation: Presbyterian minister

The Reverend Doctor William Lambie Nelson (20 September 1808 – 13 June 1887) was an Australian politician who was briefly a Member of the Queensland Legislative Assembly.

== Early life ==
Rev. Nelson was of Scottish origin and arrived in Australia in 1853 after being invited by the Sydney Presbytery to take spiritual charge of the Presbyterians in the district of Ipswich. He resigned from this position in 1860 to take up pastoral pursuits on the Moonie River. Prior to his resignation, he was encouraging subscriptions for a new Church of Scotland to be built in Toowoomba, and he was identified as a Presbyterian minister in Toowoomba in 1868.

== Politics ==
William Nelson was elected to the Queensland Legislative Assembly in the three-member electorate of West Moreton on 3 May 1860 in the inaugural 1860 Queensland colonial election. However, Mr Chubb on behalf of one of the unsuccessful candidates, Pollett Cardew, protested against the election of the Reverend Nelson as he was a priest in holy orders and was therefore disqualified from being elected, but the Rev. Nelson claimed that he had resigned his religious role. On 22 June 1860, the Committee on Elections ruled that the Rev. Nelson was disqualified and a new election must be called to replace him. Joseph Fleming won the resulting by-election on 9 July 1860.

== Personal life ==
Although his own political career was very brief, William Lambie Nelson's son Hugh Muir Nelson went on to be Premier of Queensland.

His homestead Gabbinbar in Toowoomba was listed on the Queensland Heritage Register on 21 October 1992.

Nelson died in 1887 and was buried in Southport General Cemetery.

== See also ==
- Members of the Queensland Legislative Assembly, 1860–1863

Parliament of Queensland
New seat	Member for West Moreton; 1860; Served alongside: Alfred Broughton, George Thorn (senior)	Succeeded by Joseph Fleming
