= John Jessop =

Australian politician

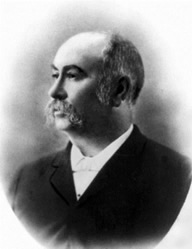

Member of the Queensland Legislative Assembly for Dalby
- In office 31 January 1882 – 29 April 1893
- Preceded by: George Simpson
- Succeeded by: Joshua Thomas Bell

Personal details
- Born: John Shillito Jessop; 14 August 1840 Whitby, Yorkshire, England
- Died: 4 July 1895 (aged 54) Dalby, Queensland, Australia
- Resting place: Dalby Monumental Cemetery
- Spouse: Jane Brown (m.1863)
- Occupation: Grazier, Butcher

John Shillito Jessop (14 August 1840 – 4 July 1895) was a member of the Queensland Legislative Assembly.

Jessop was born at Whitley, North Yorkshire, England, and educated at private schools at Whitley and Pollington, and at the Snaith Grammar School. In 1859 he arrived in Melbourne, and in 1864 went to Queensland, and came to Dalby in 1867 commenced butchering business.

In January 1882, he was elected to represent Dalby in the Legislative Assembly—a seat he held until 1893 when he was defeated by Joshua Thomas Bell. Jessop was Chairman of Committees in the Assembly from 15 August 1888 to 30 June 1891.

Jessop was president of the Northern Downs Jockey Club, president of the Dalby and Northern Downs Agricultural Association, of the Dalby Hospital, and the Dalby School of Arts, and was also prominently connected with other Institutions, including the Masonic and Oddfellows' lodges.

He died in Dalby, Queensland on 4 July 1895 and was buried in Dalby Monumental Cemetery.

Parliament of Queensland
Preceded by George Simpson	Member for Dalby; 1882–1893	Succeeded by Joshua Thomas Bell
