= Michael O'Keeffe (Queensland politician) =

Australian politician

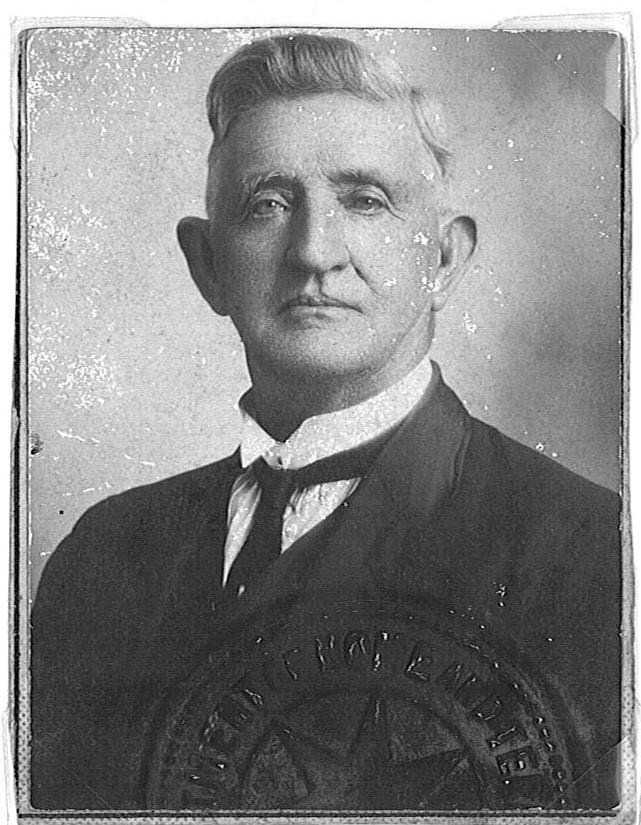

Member of the Queensland Legislative Assembly for Lockyer
- In office 27 August 1904 – 18 May 1907
- Preceded by: William Drayton Armstrong
- Succeeded by: William Drayton Armstrong

Personal details
- Born: 1854 Cashel, County Tipperary, Ireland
- Died: 30 August 1941 (aged 87) Laidley, Queensland, Australia
- Resting place: Laidley Cemetery
- Party: Kidstonites
- Spouse: Elizabeth Ryan (m.1922)
- Occupation: Dairy farmer

Michael O'Keeffe (1854 – 30 August 1941) was a member of the Queensland Legislative Assembly.

== Biography ==
O'Keeffe was born at Cashel, County Tipperary, the son of William O'Keeffe and his wife Ellen (née Heffernan). He was educated in Cashel and arrived in Queensland where he selected land in the Lockyer region ad became a successful farmer and grazier. In 1911 he became an immigration agent for Queensland, based in Ireland.

On 10 July 1872 O'Keeffe married Elizabeth Ryan (died 1922) and together had four sons and six daughters. He died at Laidley in August 1941 and his funeral proceeded from St Patrick's Catholic Church in Laidley to the Laidley Cemetery.

== Public career ==
O'Keeffe first entered politics as a councilor for the Laidley Divisional Board before unsuccessfully challenging William Drayton Armstrong for the seat of Lockyer in the Queensland Legislative Assembly at the 1902 Queensland state election.

At the 1904 Queensland state election he challenged Armstrong again and this time was successful. In 1907 however, Armstrong won back the electorate. O'Keeffe stood one more time against Armstrong, this time in 1909 but was once again beaten.

He was a founder of the Queensland Farmers Co-operative Association and a director of the company from 1907. He was also a Director of the Booval Co-operative Dairy Company, and a member of the Laidley Agricultural Society.

Parliament of Queensland
Preceded by William Drayton Armstrong	Member for Lockyer; 1904–1907	Succeeded by William Drayton Armstrong
