= John Donald McLean =

Australian politician

The Hon John Donald McLean
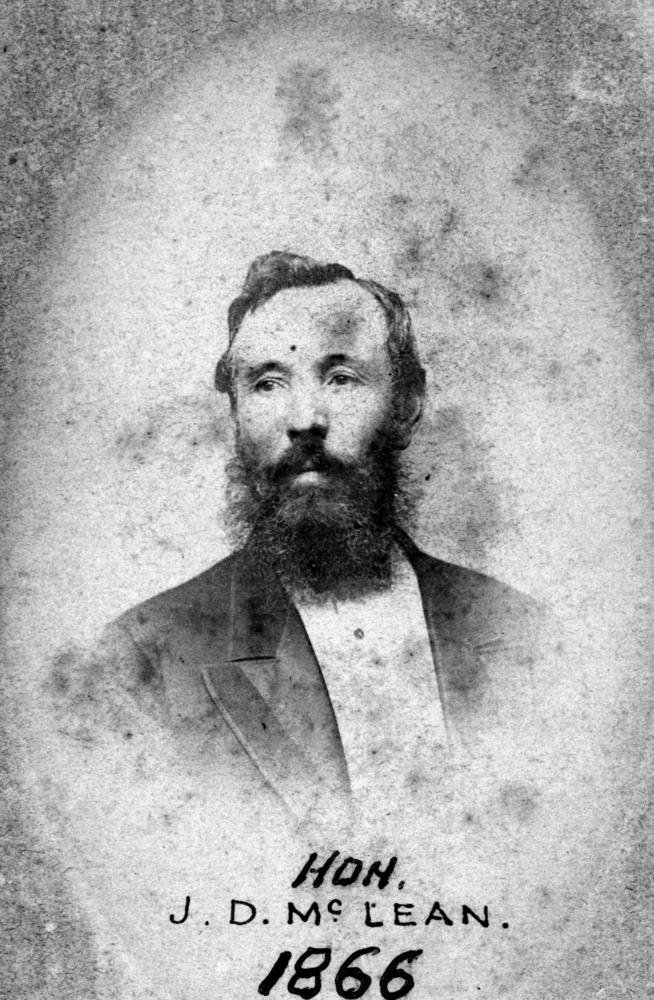

4th Treasurer of Queensland
- In office 21 July 1866 – 16 Dec 1866
- Preceded by: Joshua Bell
- Succeeded by: John Douglas
- Constituency: Eastern Downs

Member of the Queensland Legislative Assembly for Eastern Downs
- In office 2 May 1862 – 16 December 1866
- Preceded by: Ratcliffe Pring
- Succeeded by: John Douglas

Personal details
- Born: 1820 Kilmuir, Inverness-shire, Scotland
- Died: 16 December 1866 (aged 45–46) Westbrook, Queensland
- Spouse: Mary Strutt
- Occupation: General Merchant, Grazier, Station Hand

John Donald McLean (1820 – 16 December 1866) was a politician and colonial Treasurer of Queensland.

== Early life ==
McLean was born in Kilmuir, Inverness-shire, Scotland, the youngest son of Donald McLean, landowner, and his wife Flora née Nicholson. McLean emigrated to New South Wales in 1837, and ultimately went largely into squatting pursuits, being at one time interested in no less than forty stations. Latterly he resided on his property at Westbrook, Darling Downs, Queensland.

== Political life ==
On 2 May 1862 McLean was elected to the Queensland Legislative Assembly for Eastern Downs, a seat he held until his death.

McLean was Colonial Treasurer from 21 Jul 1866 until his death. Maclean took office in the midst of a monetary crisis, but quickly restored the equilibrium of the finances, when his career was cut short by a fall from his horse which ended fatally on 16 December 1866 in Westbrook, Queensland.

Political offices
Preceded by Joshua Bell	Treasurer of Queensland; 1866	Succeeded by John Douglas
Parliament of Queensland
Preceded by Ratcliffe Pring	Member for Eastern Downs; 1862 – 1866	Succeeded by John Douglas
