= Westbrook, Queensland =

Westbrook
- Town
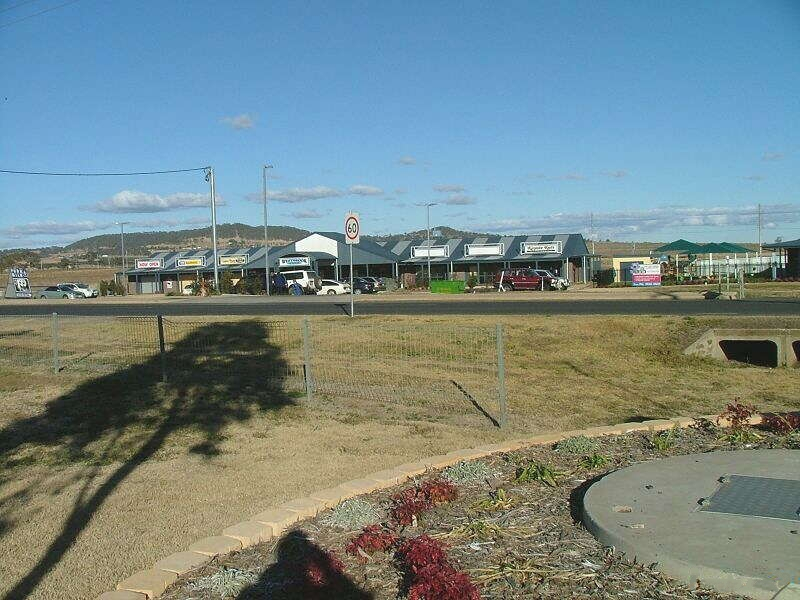
- Main Street, Westbrook, looking toward Mount Rascal

- Interactive map of Westbrook
- Coordinates: 27.6047°S 151.8694°E
- Country: Australia
- State: Queensland
- City: Toowoomba
- LGA: Toowoomba Region
- Location: 10.5 km (6.5 mi) SW of Toowoomba CBD; 137 km (85 mi) W of Brisbane

Government
  - State electorate: Condamine
  - Federal division: Groom

Area
  - Total: 60.7 km^{2} (23.4 sq mi)

Population
  - Total: 4,408 (2021 census)
  - Density: 72.62/km^{2} (188.08/sq mi)
- Time zone: UTC+10:00 (AEST)
- Postcode: 4350
Localities around Westbrook
Biddeston	Wellcamp	Glenvale
Biddeston	Westbrook	Drayton
Athol	Wyreema	Finnie

Westbrook is a rural town and locality in the Toowoomba Region, Queensland, Australia. In the 2021 census, the locality of Westbrook had a population of 4,408 people.

== Geography ==
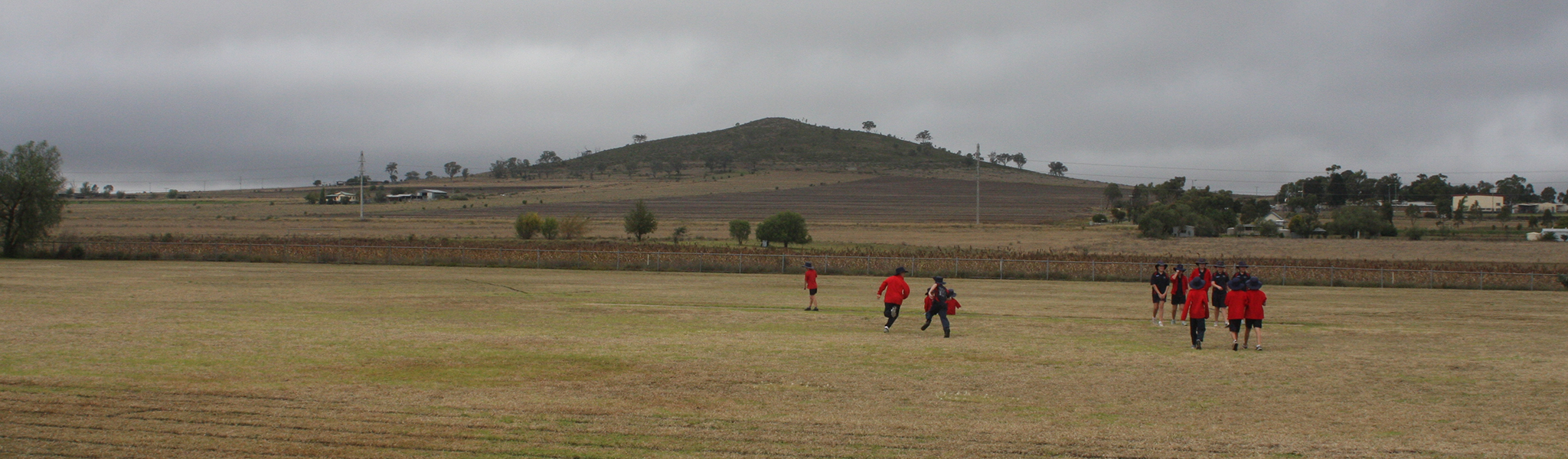
Bunkers Hill, 2020

The Gore Highway passes through Westbrook. The Toowoomba Second Range Crossing passes through the western part of the locality with no intersections. The Toowoomba-Karara Road runs along the south-eastern boundary.

Westbrook has the following mountains:

- Bunkers Hill (27.6258°S 151.8365°E) 631 metres (2,070 ft)
- Sugarloaf (27.5968°S 151.8386°E) 598 metres (1,962 ft)

== History ==
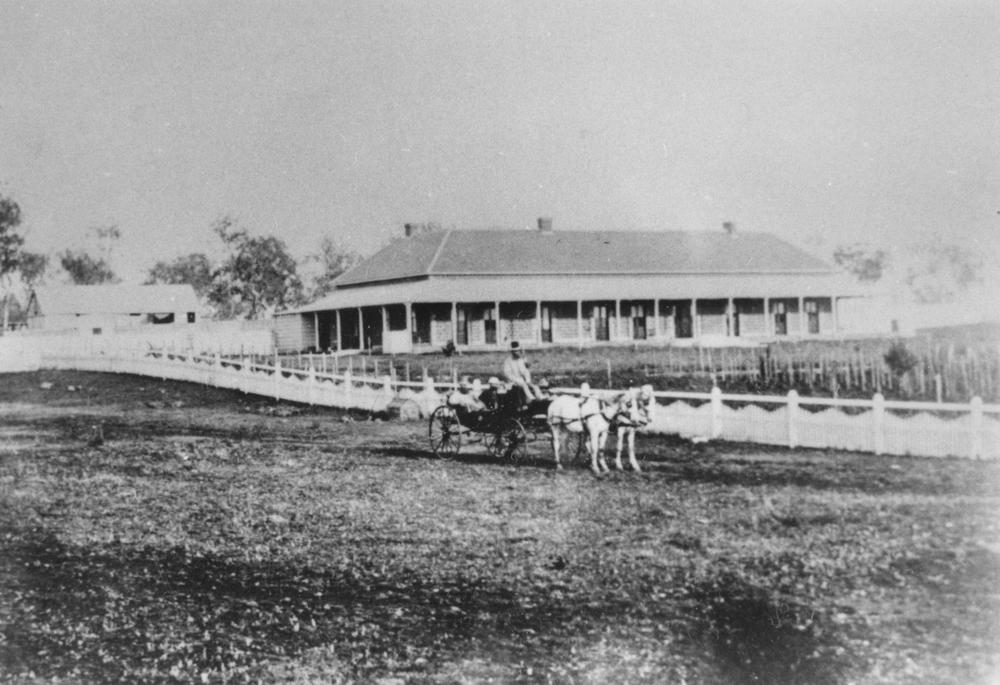
Open carriage outside the Westbrook Station homestead, circa 1877

The name Westbrook comes from the name of the Westbrook pastoral run named by John 'Tinker' Campbell, a pastoralist and merchant, in 1841. The name has been attributed to be self-explanatory: a running brook or stream.

In 1877, 11,500 acres (4,700 ha) of land was resumed from the Westbrook pastoral run to establish smaller farms. The land was offered for selection on 17 April 1877.

Bunker's Hill State School opened on 1 January 1899 under head teacher Walter Richmond.

Westbrook Reformatory School for Boys opened on 5 May 1900, having been relocated from Lytton Hill on the orders of Colonel George Arthur French, Commandant of the newly created Queensland Defence Force. On 30 October 1919, it was renamed Farm Home for Boys, Westbrook to have a "positive 'moral effect' on the boys". On 26 May 1966 it was renamed Westbrook Training Centre. Circa 1987, it was renamed Westbrook Youth Detention Centre. It closed on 30 June 1994. It was located at a site bounded by Westbrook Wyreema Road, Toowoomba Athol Road and Althus Road (27.6171°S 151.8308°E).

Westbrook Presbyterian Church was officially opened on Sunday 15 June 1902 by Reverend Robert Henry Roberts. Reverend Joseph Lundie and Messrs Munro and Robertson, all of Toowoomba, donated the 1-acre (0.40 ha) site, while Frederick George Gray Couper of Westbrook Station gifted the building, a former billiard room at the Westbrook Homestead. Prior to the opening of the church, Presbyterian worship had been held in the home of Mr and Mrs Hugh Campbell. On Saturday 14 June 1952, the church celebrated its golden jubilee with the laying of the foundation stone for a new church building by Ralph Havelock Couper, son of Frederick Couper who donated the original building. On Sunday 14 September 1952, the new church building was officially opened by the Reverend J. Fairlie Forrest with over 200 people attending. The new church cost only £900 due to the men of the congregation providing volunteer labour. The church was sold circa 1995 and has been converted into a house. It is at 1220 Gore Highway (27.6127°S 151.8324°E).

Westbrook Provisional School opened on 25 July 1887. In 1903, it was renamed Athol Provisional School and became Athol State School on 1 October 1910. It closed on 20 July 1962. It was located on the north-east corner of Athol School Road and Berghofer Road in neighbouring Athol (27.6043°S 151.7504°E).

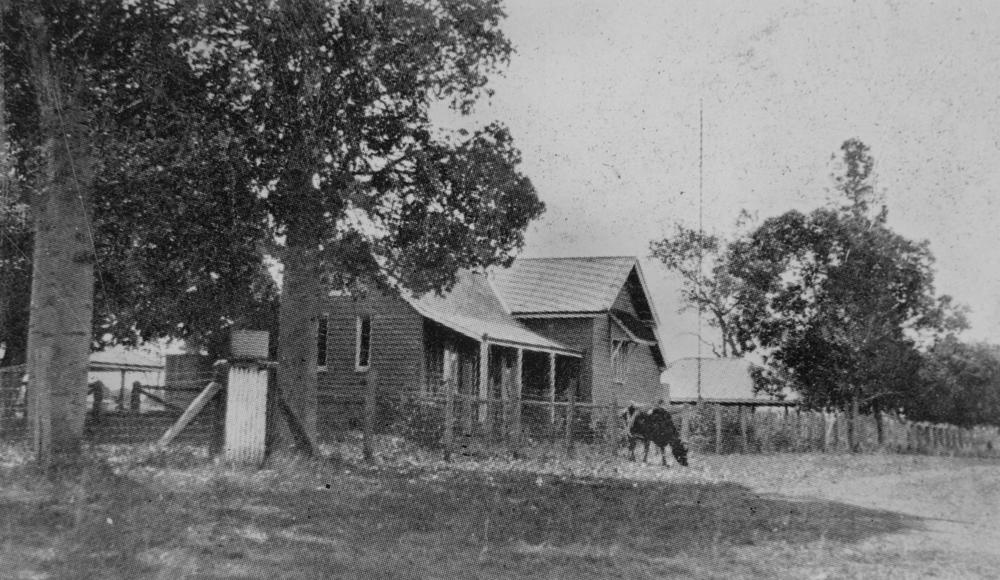
Westbrook State School, 1930

Westbrook Crossing State School opened on 9 February 1910, but it was later renamed Westbrook State School. It was officially opened by James Tolmie and Thomas Robert Roberts, the two Members of the Queensland Legislative Assembly for Drayton and Toowoomba. The school closed on 6 July 1969. It was on the north-western corner of Barwick Street and Gore Street (27.6061°S 151.8699°E).

On Sunday 20 February 1910 Reverend Father Fouhy opened a Catholic church in Westbrook, about 4 miles (6.4 km) from the railway crossing on the main Westbrook Road. The architects were James Marks and Son of Toowoomba and it was built by H. Andrews.

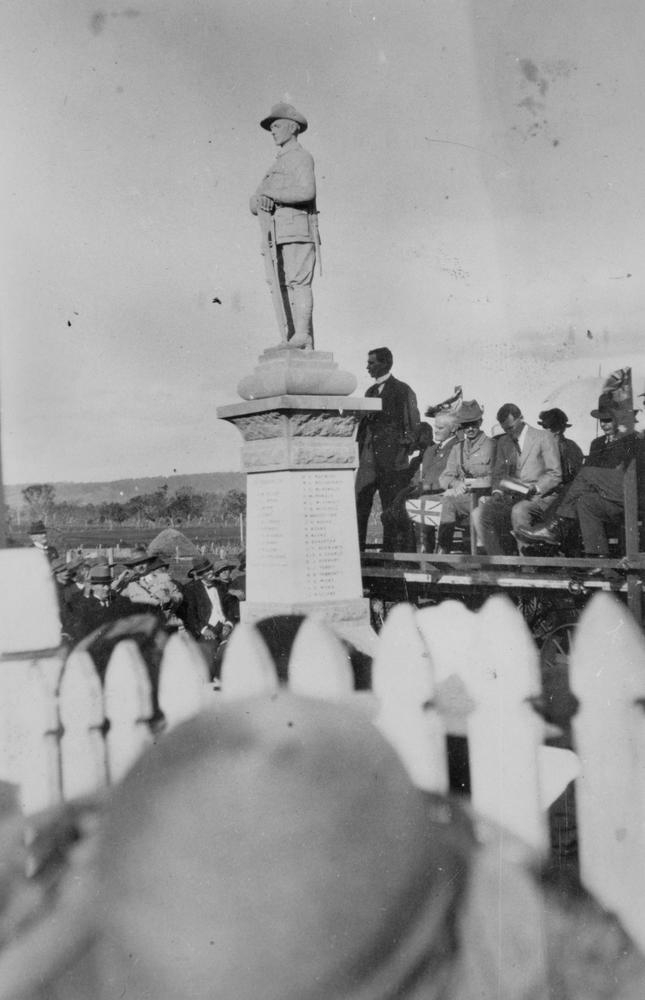
Westbrook War Memorial, Anzac Day 1922

On 25 April (Anzac Day) 1922, the Westbrook War Memorial was unveiled by Littleton Groom, the then Attorney-General for Australia and Member for the Darling Downs. The memorial commemorates the service of 47 local men in World War I and is located at Main Street in front of the Westbrook Hall.

The town has grown to become a satellite suburb of Toowoomba and is now one of the fastest growing areas of the city, and is home to many of its workers.

== Demographics ==
In the 2016 census, the locality of Westbrook had a population of 3,885 people.

In the 2021 census, the locality of Westbrook had a population of 4,408 people.

== Heritage listings ==
Westbrook has a number of heritage-listed sites, including:

- Westbrook Homestead, Coupers Road (27.6008°S 151.7936°E)
- Westbrook War Memorial, 114 Toowoomba Road (27.6094°S 151.8667°E)

== Education ==
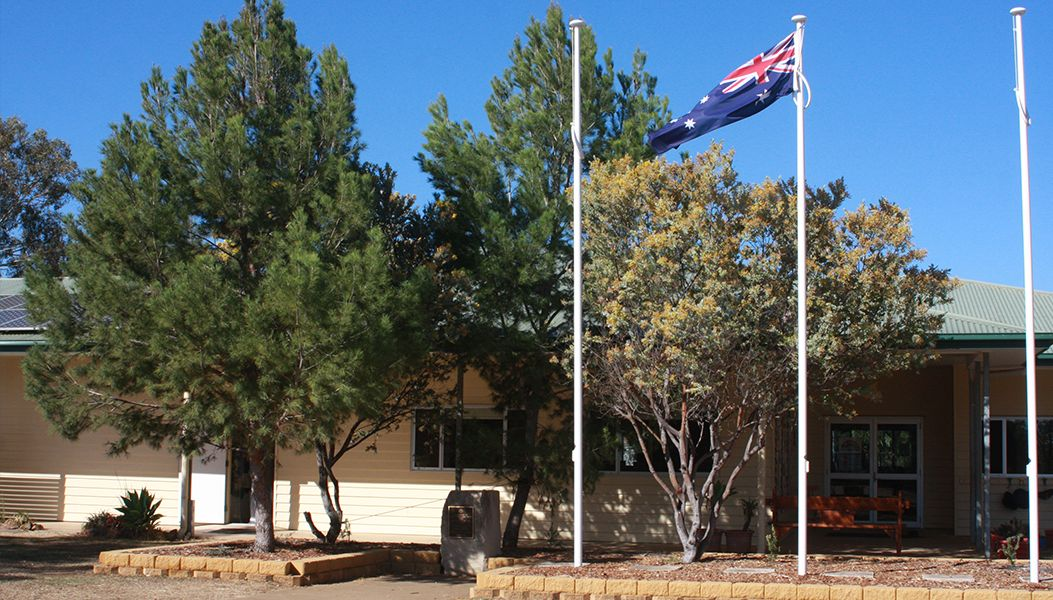
Bunker's Hill State School, circa 2022

Bunker's Hill State School is a government primary (Preparation to Grade 6) school for boys and girls at 315 Bunkers Hill School Road (27.6060°S 151.8333°E). In 2012, it had 205 students enrolled with 17 teachers (12.6 full-time equivalent). In 2018, the school had an enrolment of 253 students with 19 teachers (16 full-time equivalent) and 14 non-teaching staff (8 full-time equivalent).

There are no secondary schools in Westbrook. The nearest government secondary school is Harristown State High School in Harristown to the north-east.

== Amenities ==
Library services in Westbrook are provided by the Toowoomba Regional Council's mobile library service. The van visits Main Street every Saturday.

There are a number of parks in the area:

- Carla Crescent Park (27.5998°S 151.8713°E)
- Centenary Park (27.6055°S 151.8704°E)
- Ferguson Road Park (27.5988°S 151.8768°E)
- Michael Street Park (27.6026°S 151.8760°E)
- Westbrook / Westbrook Skate Park (27.6073°S 151.8693°E)
