= Jim Sparkes =

Australian politician

Sir Jim Sparkes
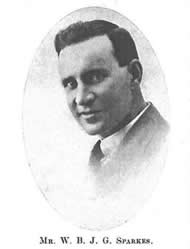

Member of the Queensland Legislative Assembly for Dalby
- In office 11 June 1932 – 11 May 1935
- Preceded by: Wilfred Russell
- Succeeded by: Godfrey Morgan

Member of the Queensland Legislative Assembly for Aubigny
- In office 29 March 1941 – 28 May 1960
- Preceded by: Arthur Moore
- Succeeded by: Les Diplock

Personal details
- Born: Walter Beresford James Gordon Sparkes; 22 April 1889 Dubbo, New South Wales, Australia
- Died: 15 June 1974 (aged 85) Toowoomba, Queensland, Australia
- Party: Country Party
- Other political affiliations: Country and Progressive National Party
- Spouse(s): Jessie Elizabeth Lang (m.1912), Alice Goongarry Scott (m.1920 d.1983)
- Occupation: Cattle breeder

Sir Walter Beresford James Gordon Sparkes (22 April 1889 – 15 June 1974) was a Member of the Queensland Legislative Assembly.

== Early life ==
Sparkes was born at Dubbo, New South Wales in 1889 to James Sparkes and his wife Mary Ann (née Yates). He was educated at Croydon Park Public School and St Joseph's College, Hunters Hill before moving to Queensland in 1910. By 1912 he had purchased Lyndley Hereford Stud at Jandowae, one of the oldest and best known Hereford studs in Australia. Sparkes expanded the stud from its original 3,000 acres to 16,000 acres by acquiring adjoining properties. Over the years he went on to acquire many properties across the southern part of the state.

== Politics ==
Sparkes was elected as a councillor to the Wambo Shire Council in 1916 and eventually became its chairman between 1922–31 and 1937–52. He entered the state parliament in 1932, winning Dalby for the Country and Progressive National Party but did not seek re-election in 1935. Representing the Country Party in 1941, Sparkes won the seat of Aubigny, holding it for 19 years until his defeat in 1960 by Queensland Labor Party candidate, Les Diplock. During this period he was the Opposition whip from 1950 till 1957.

== Personal life ==
Sparkes was married twice; first, Jessie Elizabeth Lang in 1912 and then Alice Goongarry Scott in 1920. He had six children with his two partners including Sir Robert Sparkes, president of the Queensland branch of the National Party from 1970 till 1990.

He was knighted in 1970.

Sparkes died at Toowoomba in 1974 and was cremated. The Queensland Premier at the time, Joh Bjelke-Petersen told the members of parliament that "Sparkes spoke almost daily in this Chamber on behalf of the working man and the man on the land. He always fought their case, and fought it hard".

Parliament of Queensland
Preceded by Wilfred Russell	Member for Dalby; 1932–1935	Succeeded by Godfrey Morgan
Preceded by Arthur Moore	Member for Aubigny; 1941–1960	Succeeded by Les Diplock
