= William North (politician) =

Australian politician

William Roger North (c. 1850 – 27 January 1936) was a politician in colonial Queensland. He was a member of the Queensland Legislative Assembly, representing Lockyer from 1888 to 1893.

North was born in Dublin, Ireland.
