= Joshua Peter Bell =

Australian politician in the colony of Queensland (1827-1881)

The Hon Sir Joshua Peter Bell KCMG
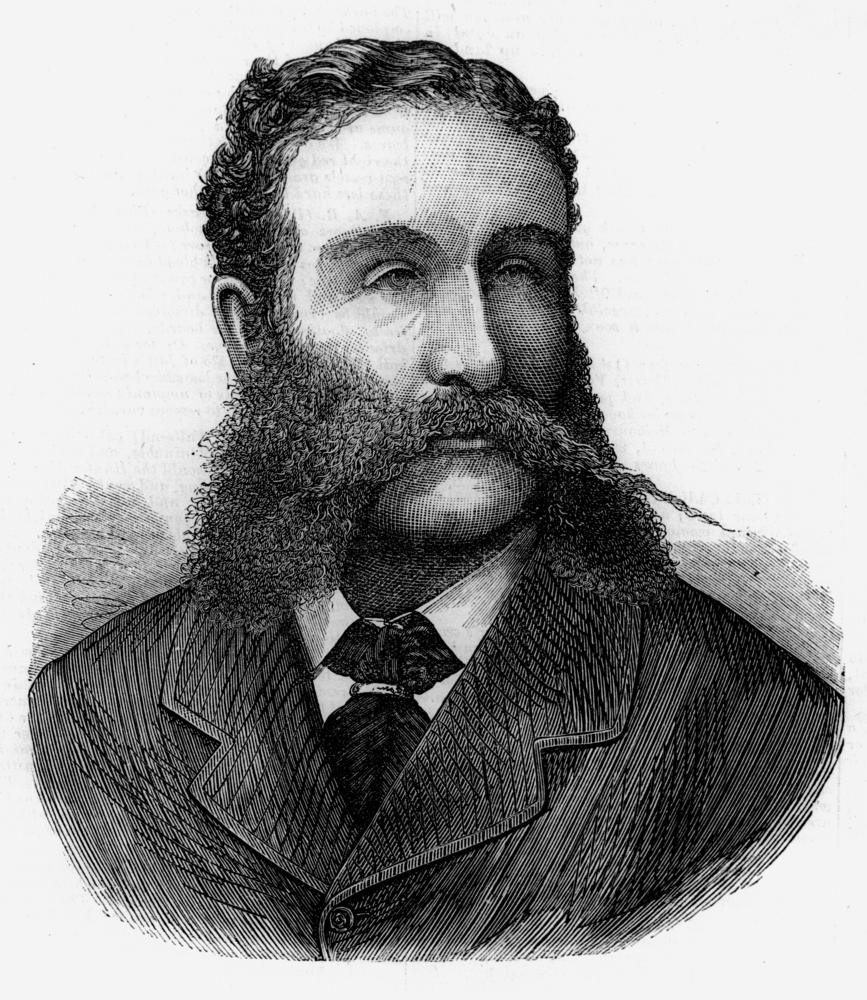

3rd Treasurer of Queensland
- In office 22 December 1864 – 20 July 1866
- Preceded by: Thomas Moffatt
- Succeeded by: John Donald McLean
- Constituency: West Moreton
- In office 28 March 1871 – 8 January 1874
- Preceded by: Robert Ramsay
- Succeeded by: William Hemmant
- Constituency: Northern Downs (1871-1873)
- Constituency: Dalby (1873-1874)

President of the Queensland Legislative Council
- In office 3 April 1879 – 20 December 1881
- Preceded by: Sir Maurice O'Connell
- Succeeded by: Sir Arthur Palmer

Member of the Queensland Legislative Assembly for West Moreton
- In office 15 December 1862 – 28 September 1868 Serving with Henry Challinor, Robert Herbert, Joseph Fleming, George Thorn, Jr., Benjamin Cribb, Patrick O'Sullivan
- Preceded by: Joseph Fleming
- Succeeded by: Frederick Forbes

Member of the Queensland Legislative Assembly for Northern Downs
- In office 28 September 1868 – 11 November 1873
- Preceded by: Henry Thorn
- Succeeded by: Henry Thorn
- In office 21 November 1878 – 2 April 1879
- Preceded by: William Miles
- Succeeded by: George Thorn Jr.

Member of the Queensland Legislative Assembly for Dalby
- In office 10 November 1873 – 15 November 1878
- Succeeded by: George Simpson

Queensland Legislative Council
- In office 3 April 1879 – 20 December 1881

Personal details
- Born: 19 January 1827 County Kildare, Ireland
- Died: 20 December 1881 (aged 54) Brisbane, Queensland
- Resting place: Toowong Cemetery
- Spouse: Margaret Miller Dorsey
- Relations: Joshua Thomas Bell (son), John Alexander Bell (brother)
- Occupation: pastoralist

Sir Joshua Peter Bell K.C.M.G. (19 January 1827 – 20 December 1881) was an Australian politician and pastoralist. He was Treasurer of Queensland from 1864 to 1866 and from 1871 to 1874, and President of the Queensland Legislative Council from 1879 to 1881. His eldest son was barrister and parliamentarian Joshua Thomas Bell.

== Early life ==
Bell was born in Kildare, Ireland, eldest son of Thomas Bell and his wife Sarah, née Alexander. The family emigrated to Australia around 1830. He attended the Sydney College and King's School, Parramatta. In 1848, Bell became joint manager of Jimbour Station in Darling Downs, then part of the Colony of New South Wales with his brother Alexander after his father had taken over the lease of the property. Bell soon assumed sole control of the station due to his astute management that saw the station becoming one of the most respected in the area.

== Parliamentary career ==
=== Early parliamentary career ===
Due to his status as a prominent landholder, Bell was invited to stand in the elections in 1862 for the seat of West Moreton. He won this seat with a considerable majority and remained in office for six years. In 1868 he stood for the seat of Northern Downs (Dalby), the local constituency of Jimbour Station, in the Legislative Assembly of Queensland. He was successful in this election and continued to hold the seat for eleven years.

=== Ministerial career ===
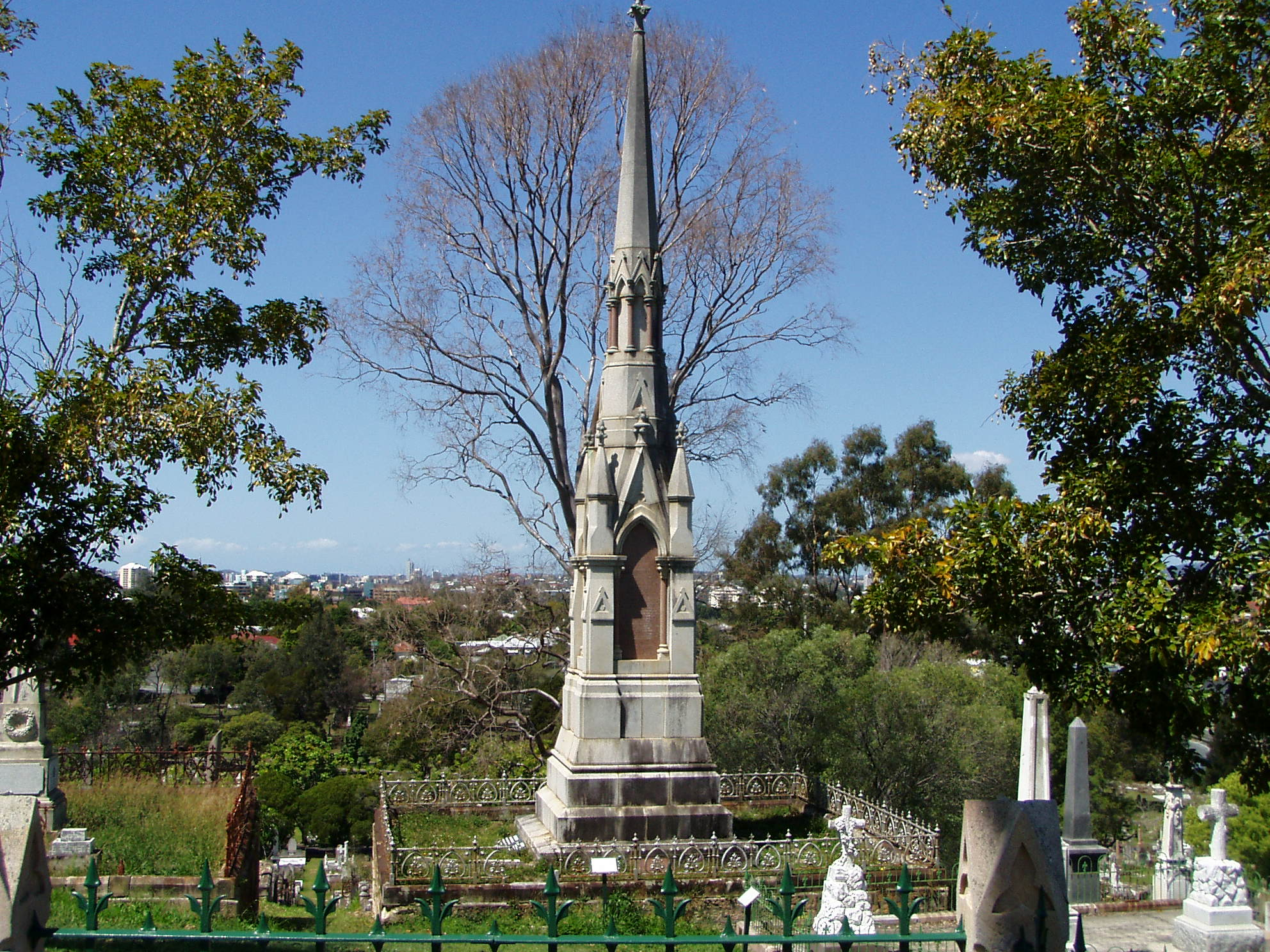
Monument at the grave of Joshua Peter Bell.

In his eleven years in parliament in the seat of Northern Downs, Bell gained a number of ministerial roles. In 1864 he was appointed treasurer in the first ministry of Robert Herbert, a position he held until 1866. Bell later assumed the role of treasurer in a subsequent government in 1871 and remained in office for further three years. Bell also held a number of other ministerial positions, notably Minister for Lands in 1866 and acting Minister for Works in 1867.

=== Further career ===
In 1879 Bell transferred to the Queensland Legislative Council and was elected president. For a short period of time from March to November 1880, Bell was appointed as Administrator in the absence of the then Governor Sir Arthur Kennedy. He was appointed K.C.M.G. in 1881.

== Later life ==
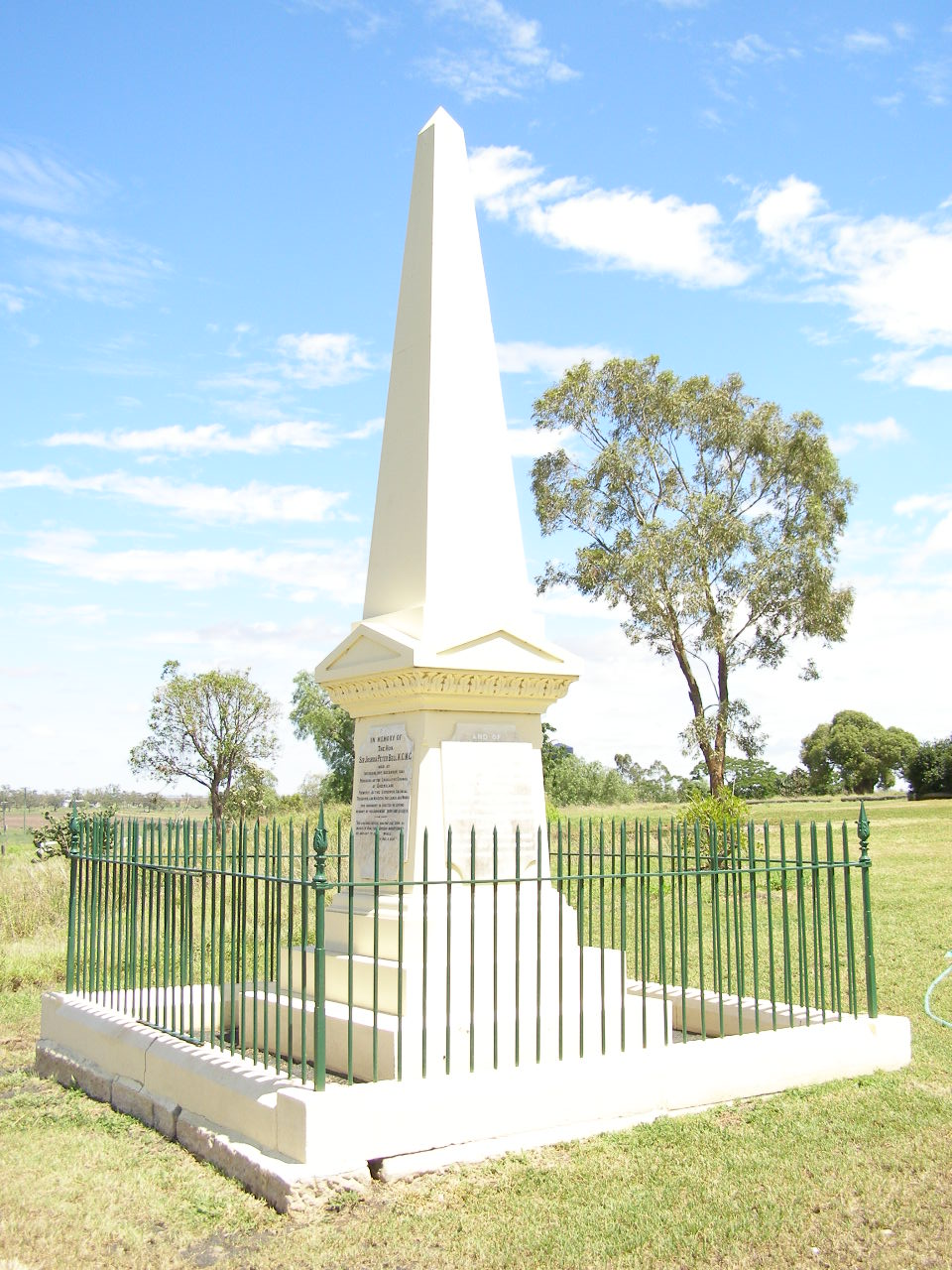
Joshua Peter Bell monument, 2007

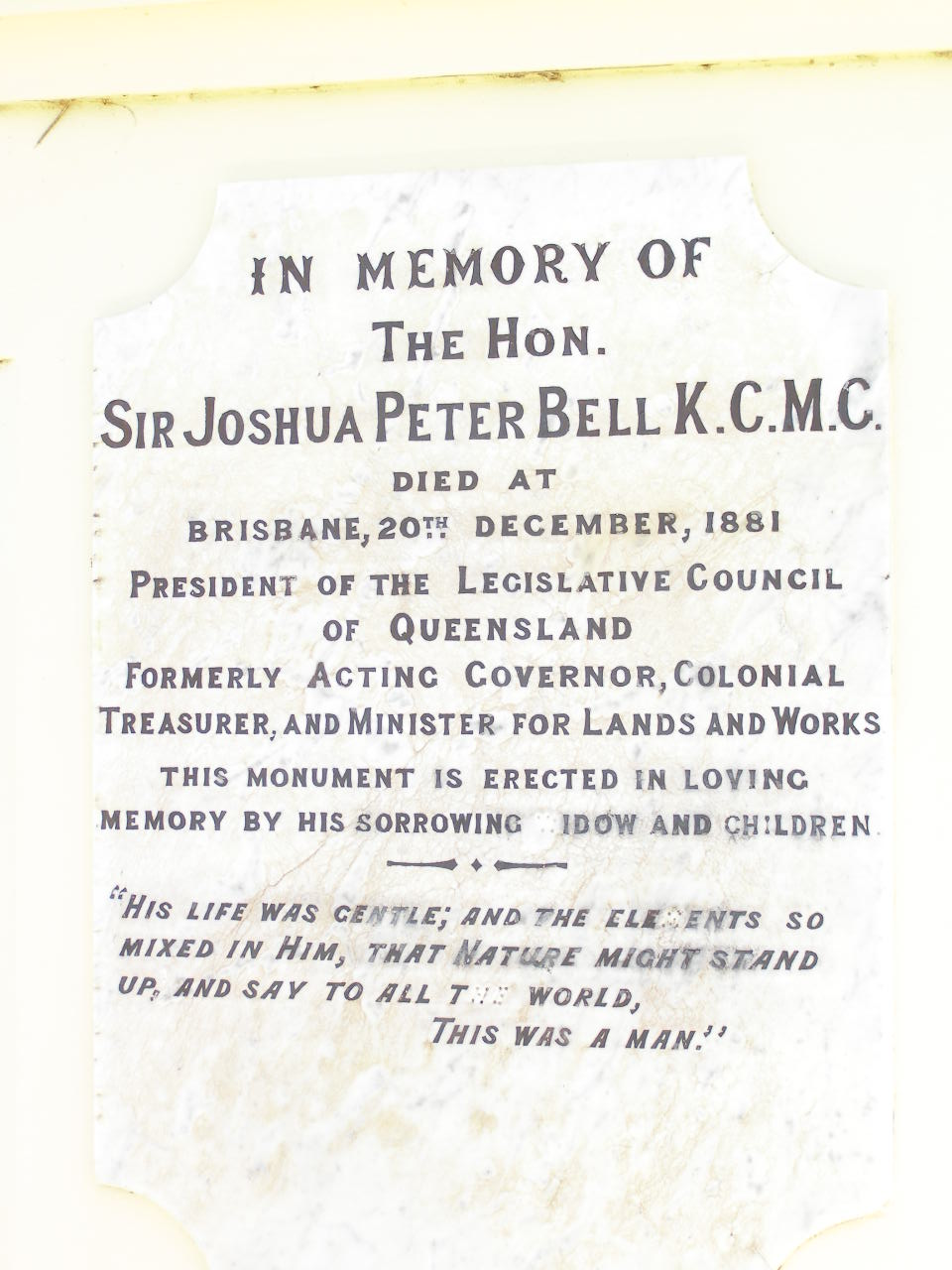
Plaque on memorial, Jimbour, 2007

Joshua Peter Bell died suddenly on 20 December 1881 and was buried at Toowong Cemetery. A memorial to him was also erected at Jimbour Homestead.

== Legacy ==
The town of Bell was named after him.

Parliament of Queensland
Preceded by Joseph Fleming	Member for West Moreton; 1862–1868; Served alongside: Henry Challinor, Robert Herbert, Joseph Fleming, George Thorn, Jr., Benjamin Cribb, Patrick O'Sullivan	Succeeded by Frederick Forbes
Preceded by Henry Thorn	Member for Northern Downs; 1868–1873	Succeeded by Henry Thorn
New seat	Member for Dalby; 1873–1878	Succeeded by George Simpson
Preceded by William Miles	Member for Northern Downs; 1878–1879	Succeeded by George Thorn junior
Political offices
Preceded by Thomas Moffatt	Treasurer of Queensland; 1864–1866	Succeeded by John Donald McLean
