= Electoral district of West Moreton (Queensland) =

Former state electoral district of Queensland, Australia

West Moreton Queensland—Legislative Assembly
- State: Queensland
- Dates current: 1860-1878, 1932-1949

West Moreton was the name of two incarnations of an electoral district of the Legislative Assembly in the Australian state of Queensland.

== History ==
The original district, named for the region it covered, took in all of the Brisbane River catchment area as well as Ipswich and Laidley, bordering New South Wales to the south. It elected three members from 1860 to 1873 and one member from 1873 until its abolition in 1878.

The district was re-created in 1932 to take in an area west of Brisbane. It was abolished in 1949.

== Elections ==
=== 1860–1863 ===
In the inaugural 1860 election, there were five candidates for the three-member electoral district of West Moreton: George Thorn (senior), Alfred Broughton, Pollett Cardew, J. Kent, and the Rev. Dr. William Nelson. On election day 3 May 1860, Thorn, Broughton and Nelson were elected. However, Mr Chubb on behalf of the unsuccessful Mr Cardew protested against the election of the Reverend Nelson as he was a priest in holy orders and was therefore disqualified from being elected. The Rev. Nelson then announced that he had resigned his religious role. On 22 June 1860, the Committee on Elections ruled that the Rev. Nelson was disqualified and a new election must be called to replace him. Joseph Fleming won the resulting by-election on 9 July 1860.

Fleming held the seat until he resigned on 3 November 1862 when he became bankrupt. Joshua Peter Bell won the resulting by-election on 15 December 1862.

== Members for West Moreton ==
Three member electorate (1860–73)
Member	Party	Term	Member	Party	Term	Member	Party	Term
Alfred Broughton	Unaligned	1860	George Thorn (senior)	Unaligned	1860–61	William Nelson	Unaligned	1860–60
Alfred Broughton	Unaligned	1860	George Thorn (senior)	Unaligned	1860–61	Joseph Fleming	Unaligned	1860–62
Henry Challinor	Unaligned	1861–63	George Thorn (senior)	Unaligned	1860–61	Joseph Fleming	Unaligned	1860–62
Henry Challinor	Unaligned	1861–63	Benjamin Cribb	Unaligned	1861–67	Joseph Fleming	Unaligned	1860–62
Henry Challinor	Unaligned	1861–63	Benjamin Cribb	Unaligned	1861–67	Joshua Peter Bell	Unaligned	1862–68
Robert Herbert	Unaligned	1863–66	Benjamin Cribb	Unaligned	1861–67	Joshua Peter Bell	Unaligned	1862–68
Joseph Fleming	Unaligned	1866–67	Benjamin Cribb	Unaligned	1861–67	Joshua Peter Bell	Unaligned	1862–68
George Thorn, Jr.	Unaligned	1867–1873	Patrick O'Sullivan	Unaligned	1867–68	Joshua Peter Bell	Unaligned	1862–68
George Thorn, Jr.	Unaligned	1867–1873	Samuel Hodgson	Unaligned	1868–70	Frederick Forbes	Unaligned	1868–73
George Thorn, Jr.	Unaligned	1867–1873	John Ferrett	Unaligned	1870–73	Frederick Forbes	Unaligned	1868–73

Single member electorate
First incarnation (1873–78)
Member	Party	Term
James Foote	Unaligned	1873–77
Second incarnation (1932–1949)
Member	Party	Term
Ted Maher	Country and Progressive National	1932–36
Ted Maher	Country	1936–49

== Notable members ==
The district seated two Premiers: Robert Herbert and George Thorn, Jr.

== See also ==
- Electoral districts of Queensland
- Members of the Queensland Legislative Assembly by year
- Category:Members of the Queensland Legislative Assembly by name
