= Electoral results for the district of Fassifern =

Elections of Fassifern, Qld, Australia

This is a list of electoral results for the electoral district of Fassifern in Queensland state elections.

== Members for Fassifern ==
Member	Party	Term
George Thorn		1873–1874
John Thorn		1874–1878
de Burgh Fitzpatrick Persse		1878–1883
Alfred Midgley		1883–1887
George Thorn		1887–1888
William Salkeld		1888–1893
George Thorn		1893–1902
Thomas Murray-Prior	Opposition	1902
Charles Moffatt Jenkinson	Opposition	1903–1909
Arnold Wienholt	Ministerialist	1909–1913
Ernest Bell	Ministerialist	1913–1915
Ernest Bell	Liberal	1915–1918
Ernest Bell	National	1918–1920
Ernest Bell	Country	1920–1922
Ernest Bell	United	1922–1925
Ernest Bell	CPNP	1925–1930
Arnold Wienholt	Independent	1930–1935
Adolf Muller	CPNP	1935–1936
Adolf Muller	Country	1936–1969
Selwyn Muller	Country	1969–1974
Selwyn Muller	National	1974–1983
Kev Lingard	National	1983–1992

== Election results ==
=== Elections in the 1980s ===
1989 Queensland state election: Fassifern
Party	Candidate	Votes	%	±%
Labor	Don Petersen	10,140	42.4	+11.3
National	Kev Lingard	7,435	31.1	−20.2
Liberal	Margaret Grevett	5,186	21.7	+4.1
Citizens Electoral Council	Lawrence Hawkins	707	3.0	+3.0
Citizens Electoral Council	Clyde Willis	463	1.9	+1.9
Total formal votes		23,931	96.8	−1.3
Informal votes		799	3.2	+1.3
Turnout		24,730	91.8	−0.4
Two-party-preferred result
National	Kev Lingard	12,588	52.6	−11.4
Labor	Don Petersen	11,343	47.4	+11.4
National hold		Swing	−11.4	

1986 Queensland state election: Fassifern
Party	Candidate	Votes	%	±%
National	Kev Lingard	9,776	51.3	
Labor	Jim Egan	5,928	31.1	
Liberal	Margaret Grevett	3,364	17.6	
Total formal votes		19,068	98.1	
Informal votes		362	1.9	
Turnout		19,430	92.2	
Two-party-preferred result
National	Kev Lingard	12,030	63.1	−1.9
Labor	Jim Egan	7,023	36.9	+1.9
National hold		Swing	−1.9	

1983 Queensland state election: Fassifern
Party	Candidate	Votes	%	±%
National	Kev Lingard	13,306	46.0	+4.3
Labor	Brian Milner	11,780	40.7	+6.2
Liberal	Noel Clarke	3,827	13.2	−10.6
Total formal votes		28,913	98.6	−0.1
Informal votes		398	1.4	+0.1
Turnout		29,311	91.5	+2.2
Two-party-preferred result
National	Kev Lingard	16,329	56.5	−2.8
Labor	Brian Milner	12,584	43.5	+2.8
National hold		Swing	−2.8	

1980 Queensland state election: Fassifern
Party	Candidate	Votes	%	±%
National	Selwyn Muller	8,827	41.7	−19.7
Labor	Ray Parker	7,322	34.6	−4.0
Liberal	Thomas O'Toole	5,041	23.8	+23.8
Total formal votes		21,190	98.7	+1.1
Informal votes		272	1.3	−1.1
Turnout		21,462	89.3	−2.7
Two-party-preferred result
National	Selwyn Muller	12,575	59.3	−2.1
Labor	Ray Parker	8,615	40.7	+2.1
National hold		Swing	−2.1	

=== Elections in the 1970s ===
1977 Queensland state election: Fassifern
Party	Candidate	Votes	%	±%
National	Selwyn Muller	9,744	61.4	−9.8
Labor	Stephen Limbach	6,135	38.6	+9.8
Total formal votes		15,879	97.6	
Informal votes		393	2.4	
Turnout		16,272	92.0	
National hold		Swing	−9.8	

1974 Queensland state election: Fassifern
Party	Candidate	Votes	%	±%
National	Selwyn Muller	11,314	73.0	+17.4
Labor	Clifford Cherry	4,194	27.0	−5.2
Total formal votes		15,508	98.1	−0.7
Informal votes		298	1.9	+0.7
Turnout		15,806	91.1	−1.6
National hold		Swing	+7.3	

1972 Queensland state election: Fassifern
Party	Candidate	Votes	%	±%
Country	Selwyn Muller	6,867	55.6	−2.2
Labor	Murray Freiberg	3,983	32.2	−1.7
Queensland Labor	Luke O'Reilly	1,508	12.2	+5.9
Total formal votes		12,358	98.8	
Informal votes		151	1.2	
Turnout		12,509	92.7	
Two-party-preferred result
Country	Selwyn Muller	8,120	65.7	+0.5
Labor	Murray Freiberg	4,238	34.3	−0.5
Country hold		Swing	+0.5	

=== Elections in the 1960s ===
1969 Queensland state election: Fassifern
Party	Candidate	Votes	%	±%
Country	Selwyn Muller	5,240	57.8	−6.1
Labor	Jack Jones	3,076	33.9	+6.1
Queensland Labor	Gordon Blain	572	6.3	+0.3
Social Credit	Victor Robb	183	2.0	−0.3
Total formal votes		9,071	98.4	−0.3
Informal votes		149	1.6	+0.3
Turnout		9,220	94.1	−1.3
Two-party-preferred result
Country	Selwyn Muller	5,747	63.4	−6.7
Labor	Jack Jones	3,324	36.6	+6.7
Country hold		Swing	−6.7	

1966 Queensland state election: Fassifern
Party	Candidate	Votes	%	±%
Country	Adolf Muller	5,713	63.9	+28.4
Labor	Denis O'Brien	2,483	27.8	+2.2
Queensland Labor	Gordon Blain	532	6.0	+0.5
Social Credit	Victor Robb	206	2.3	+2.3
Total formal votes		8,934	98.7	0.0
Informal votes		116	1.3	0.0
Turnout		9,050	95.4	−1.3
Two-party-preferred result
Country	Adolf Muller	6,264	70.1	+27.8
Labor	Denis O'Brien	2,670	29.9	+29.9
Country gain from Independent		Swing	+27.8	

1963 Queensland state election: Fassifern
Party	Candidate	Votes	%	±%
Country	Albert Hall	3,211	35.5	−36.3
Independent	Adolf Muller	3,028	33.5	+33.5
Labor	Denis O'Brien	2,314	25.6	−2.6
Queensland Labor	Kenneth Rawle	495	5.5	+5.5
Total formal votes		9,048	98.7	−0.2
Informal votes		116	1.3	+0.2
Turnout		9,164	96.7	+1.9
Two-party-preferred result
Country	Albert Hall	6,181	68.3	−3.5
Labor	Denis O'Brien	2,867	31.7	+3.5
Two-candidate-preferred result
Independent	Adolf Muller	5,224	57.7	+57.7
Country	Albert Hall	3,824	42.3	−29.5
Independent gain from Country		Swing	+57.7	

1960 Queensland state election: Fassifern
Party	Candidate	Votes	%	±%
Country	Adolf Muller	6,507	71.8	
Labor	Denis O'Brien	2,551	28.2	
Total formal votes		9,058	98.9	
Informal votes		104	1.1	
Turnout		9,162	94.8	
Country hold		Swing		

=== Elections in the 1950s ===
1957 Queensland state election: Fassifern
Party	Candidate	Votes	%	±%
Country	Adolf Muller	6,317	73.1	−26.9
Queensland Labor	Kenneth Rawle	2,329	26.9	+26.9
Total formal votes		8,646	98.2	
Informal votes		154	1.8	
Turnout		8,800	94.1	
Country hold		Swing	−26.9	

1956 Queensland state election: Fassifern
Party	Candidate	Votes	%	±%
Country	Adolf Muller	unopposed		
Country hold		Swing		

1953 Queensland state election: Fassifern
Party	Candidate	Votes	%	±%
Country	Adolf Muller	5,954	68.1	−8.1
Independent	Oliver Hooper	2,791	31.9	+31.9
Total formal votes		8,745	98.9	−0.4
Informal votes		101	1.1	+0.4
Turnout		8,846	94.3	+0.4
Country hold		Swing	N/A	

1950 Queensland state election: Fassifern
Party	Candidate	Votes	%	±%
Country	Adolf Muller	6,788	76.2	
Labor	Thomas Lythgo	2,125	23.8	
Total formal votes		8,913	99.3	
Informal votes		63	0.7	
Turnout		8,976	93.9	
Country hold		Swing		

=== Elections in the 1940s ===
1947 Queensland state election: Fassifern
Party	Candidate	Votes	%	±%
Country	Adolf Muller	6,690	71.6	+6.2
Labor	Tom Thorpe	2,653	28.4	−1.2
Total formal votes		9,343	96.9	+1.1
Informal votes		301	3.1	−1.1
Turnout		9,644	92.8	−2.5
Country hold		Swing	+2.8	

1944 Queensland state election: Fassifern
Party	Candidate	Votes	%	±%
Country	Adolf Muller	5,984	64.7	−0.7
Labor	Roy Richards	2,633	29.6	−5.7
Independent	Cyril Brosnan	275	3.1	+3.1
Independent	George Masen	166	1.9	+1.9
Total formal votes		8,891	95.8	−2.0
Informal votes		387	4.2	+2.0
Turnout		9,278	95.3	+2.3
Country hold		Swing	+4.1	

1941 Queensland state election: Fassifern
Party	Candidate	Votes	%	±%
Country	Adolf Muller	5,981	64.7	−2.6
Labor	Peter Nelson	3,265	35.3	+2.6
Total formal votes		9,246	97.8	−0.8
Informal votes		212	2.2	+0.8
Turnout		9,458	93.0	−1.7
Country hold		Swing	−2.6	

=== Elections in the 1930s ===
1938 Queensland state election: Fassifern
Party	Candidate	Votes	%	±%
Country	Adolf Muller	6,086	67.3	+5.2
Labor	John Holman	2,951	32.7	−5.2
Total formal votes		9,037	98.6	−0.3
Informal votes		124	1.4	+0.3
Turnout		9,161	94.7	+0.3
Country hold		Swing	+5.2	

1935 Queensland state election: Fassifern
Party	Candidate	Votes	%	±%
CPNP	Adolf Muller	5,515	62.1	
Labor	James Ryan	3,368	37.9	
Total formal votes		8,883	98.9	
Informal votes		100	1.1	
Turnout		8,983	94.4	
CPNP hold		Swing		

1932 Queensland state election: Fassifern
Party	Candidate	Votes	%	±%
Independent	Arnold Wienholt	unopposed		
Independent gain from CPNP		Swing		

=== Elections in the 1920s ===
1929 Queensland state election: Fassifern
Party	Candidate	Votes	%	±%
CPNP	Ernest Bell	unopposed		
CPNP hold		Swing		

1926 Queensland state election: Fassifern
Party	Candidate	Votes	%	±%
CPNP	Ernest Bell	3,264	53.1	+0.9
Independent Country	Thomas Plunkett	2,885	46.9	+46.9
Total formal votes		6,149	99.4	+0.6
Informal votes		34	0.6	−0.6
Turnout		6,183	87.1	+4.6
CPNP hold		Swing	+0.9	

1923 Queensland state election: Fassifern
Party	Candidate	Votes	%	±%
United	Ernest Bell	3,025	52.2	−14.9
Independent	John Hardcastle	2,767	47.8	+47.8
Total formal votes		5,792	98.8	−0.8
Informal votes		72	1.2	+0.8
Turnout		5,792	82.5	−6.4
United hold		Swing	N/A	

1920 Queensland state election: Fassifern
Party	Candidate	Votes	%	±%
Country	Ernest Bell	3,132	67.1	+67.1
Labor	Jack Quinlan	1,534	32.9	−13.8
Total formal votes		4,666	99.6	+0.4
Informal votes		19	0.4	−0.4
Turnout		4,685	88.9	+0.3
Country gain from National		Swing	N/A	

=== Elections in the 1910s ===
1918 Queensland state election: Fassifern
Party	Candidate	Votes	%	±%
National	Ernest Bell	2,420	53.3	+5.5
Labor	Joseph Sweeney	2,121	46.7	+23.7
Total formal votes		4,541	99.2	+1.2
Informal votes		35	0.8	−1.2
Turnout		4,576	88.6	−3.5
National hold		Swing	−7.2	

1915 Queensland state election: Fassifern
Party	Candidate	Votes	%	±%
Liberal	Ernest Bell	1,976	47.8	−52.2
Farmers' Union	Eaton Winks	1,205	29.2	+29.2
Labor	Bill Heffernan	951	23.0	+23.0
Total formal votes		4,132	98.0	
Informal votes		85	2.0	
Turnout		4,217	92.1	
Two-candidate-preferred result
Liberal	Ernest Bell	2,007	60.5	−39.5
Farmers' Union	Eaton Winks	1,310	39.5	+39.5
Liberal hold		Swing	N/A	

1912 Queensland state election: Fassifern
Party	Candidate	Votes	%	±%
Liberal	Arnold Wienholt	unopposed		
Liberal hold		Swing		
