= Normanby Homestead =

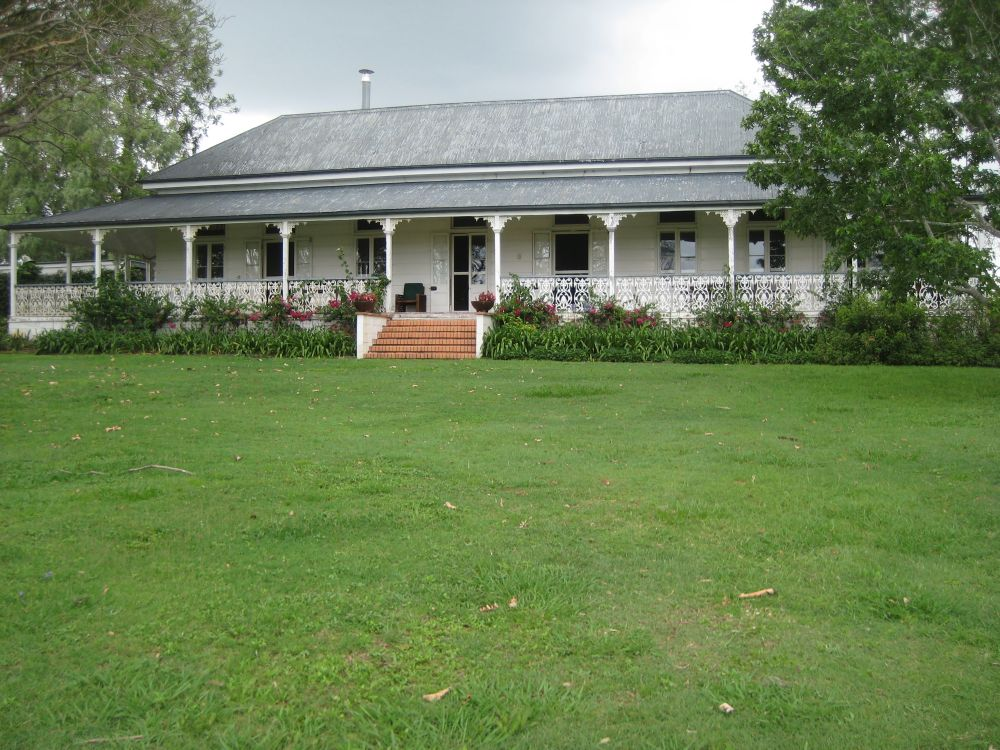
- Normanby Homestead, 2008

- Location in Queensland Normanby Homestead (Australia)
- 27.8236°S 152.6205°E
- Location: Cunningham Highway, Warrill View, Queensland, Australia

History
- Design period: 1840s–1860s (mid-19th century)
- Built: 1866–1867

Site notes
- Architect: Charles Balding

Queensland Heritage Register
- Official name: Normanby Homestead
- Type: state heritage (built, landscape)
- Designated: 21 October 1992
- Reference no.: 600737
- Significant period: 1860s–1870s (historical)
- Significant components: residential accommodation – main house, garden/grounds

Normanby Homestead is a heritage-listed homestead located on the Cunningham Highway in Warrill View, Queensland, Australia. It was designed by Charles Balding and constructed between 1866 and 1867. The homestead was added to the Queensland Heritage Register on 21 October 1992 for its historical and architectural significance.

== History ==
Normanby Homestead was constructed in 1866–67 for the George Thorn family of Ipswich, based on a design by Ipswich architect and surveyor Charles Balding.

The Normanby Plains, south of Ipswich where the homestead is located, were named by government surveyor Robert Dixon in 1839 and occupied by European pastoralists from the 1840s. Originally, Normanby was part of Rosebrook, a 10,000 hectares (25,000 acres) run on the western side of the Normanby Plains, taken up around 1843 by New South Wales pastoralist Donald McIntyre. In 1845, the Rosebrook lease was transferred to George Thorn of Ipswich. Thorn was the former superintendent of the government cattle station at Limestone from 1838 and was one of the earliest free settlers at Moreton Bay. While still employed by the government, he obtained permission to operate a small general store at Limestone. In 1842, he resigned from government service to establish Ipswich's first hotel, the Queen's Arms. Known as the "father of Ipswich," Thorn later represented West Moreton in the first Queensland Legislative Assembly. His sons George, Henry, John, and William followed him into Queensland politics, with his son George eventually becoming the Premier of Queensland.

By mid-1848, Thorn's property on the Normanby Plains was referred to as Rosebrook. Later, his son Charles took over a portion of the run, keeping the name Rosebrook, while the remaining area, about 8,000 hectares (20,000 acres), was named Normanby.

By 1855, George Thorn had made improvements to the property valued at approximately £500. The present house was constructed after he acquired the freehold of the homestead block in 1861. In September 1866, Ipswich architect Charles Balding called for tenders to build a villa residence and outbuildings at Normanby for George Thorn. The house is believed to have been completed in 1867.

In the early 1870s, John Thorn managed Normanby Station for his father until the latter's death in 1876. In 1875, the homestead was described as a "pine palace" with a lofty, spacious, polished, and lined interior. At the time, the property was supporting 20,000 sheep and 2,000 cattle. In 1878, when Normanby Station was put up for auction, the homestead included a roomy house with a wrap-around verandah, kitchen, servants' quarters, stables, coach house, outbuildings, garden, and orchard. The auction, however, was unsuccessful.

In 1881, the property was transferred to Donald Smith Wallace of Melbourne, who had married Thorn's daughter Ida Australia in 1876. The station was managed from 1883 to 1893 by Reginald Gardiner Casey, Wallace's managing partner, who married Thorn's granddaughter Evelyn Jane Harris in 1888. Casey, who served as the Member of the Queensland Legislative Assembly for Warrego from 1888 to 1893, was the father of Richard Gavin Gardiner Casey, a future Governor-General of Australia. Normanby Station continued running sheep during the Wallace-Casey period.

In 1893, the Wallace-Casey partnership was dissolved, and the property passed to the Union Mortgage & Agency Co., Ltd, of Australia in 1894. In 1901, it was acquired by Australian Estates, who subdivided and sold portions of the run over the next decade; the first subdivisional sale occurred in November 1906. During this period, the station was managed by various overseers, and cattle became the primary focus. John Bligh Nutting, a station inspector for Australian Estates, resided in the homestead for several years until he purchased the house and approximately 360 hectares (890 acres) of land in 1911.

George Hunt acquired the homestead on about 13 hectares (32 acres) in 1931, and the current owners have occupied the building since the early 1960s.

The original gateway to the property still stands, opposite the Warrill View State School. Although none of the earlier outbuildings or the former kitchen wing remain, some traces of the 19th-century formal garden are still visible. The house was renovated in the 1960s.

== Description ==
Normanby Station is located on an eastern slope overlooking Warroolaba Creek and is accessed from the west via a driveway from the town of Warril View. The single-storeyed chamferboard building has a double hipped corrugated iron roof with a central box gutter and is encircled by a skillion roofed verandah. The building has a concrete block and stump base with brick steps.

The east verandah has cast iron balustrade and brackets with a fibrous cement lined raked ceiling and timber floor. French doors with fanlights and screens open onto the verandahs. The northern verandah has been enclosed with weatherboards and casement windows to form a sunroom, kitchen and bedroom. The southern verandah has been enclosed to form a bathroom and office with fibrous cement partitions.

Internally, walls are of painted tongue and groove boards with stained timber doors and architraves. Ceilings are of fibrous cement and floors are covered in carpet and linoleum. Large sliding stained timber doors separate the lounge and dining rooms. The dining room has a fireplace with a timber surround and an arched sash window on either side.

A hall has been inserted behind the southeast bedroom to give access to the bathroom on the south, and the southwest bedroom has been divided into two rooms. The guest room has an ensuite added on the west verandah and the kitchen has been modernised.

A double carport is located to the south, a tennis court to the north and an inground concrete swimming pool to the northeast. The west facade is screened by a vine covered trellis and a twin tankstand is located to the west.

Exclusion of Furniture: The furniture contained within the homestead is expressly excluded from the cultural heritage significance of this place

== Heritage listing ==
Normanby Homestead was listed on the Queensland Heritage Register on 21 October 1992 having satisfied the following criteria.

The place is important in demonstrating the evolution or pattern of Queensland's history.

Normanby Homestead is important in demonstrating the pattern of Queensland's history because of its association with the early development of pastoralism in the Moreton Bay region, and in West Moreton in particular.

The place demonstrates rare, uncommon or endangered aspects of Queensland's cultural heritage.

It demonstrates rare surviving evidence of 1860s timber construction and plan form in a substantial rural residence.

The place has a special association with the life or work of a particular person, group or organisation of importance in Queensland's history.

Normanby Homestead has a special association with the Thorn family and their contributions, pastoral, political and commercial, to the growth of Queensland in the 19th century.
