= Thomas Murray-Prior =

Thomas Murray-Prior may refer to:

- Thomas Lodge Murray-Prior (1819–1892), Queensland politician
- Thomas de Montmorency Murray-Prior (1848–1902), his son, also a Queensland politician
