= John Ferrett =

Australian politician

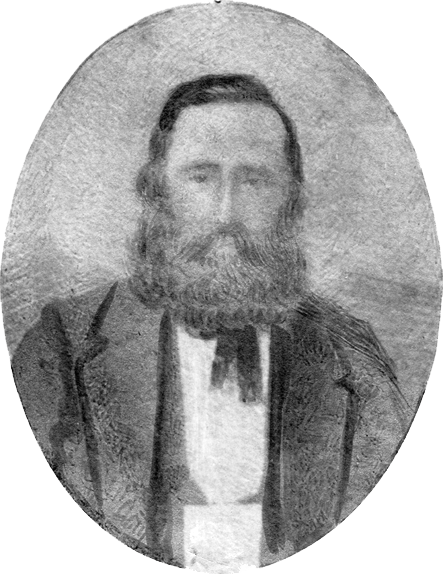

Member of the Queensland Legislative Assembly for Maranoa
- In office 4 May 1860 – 27 June 1863
- Preceded by: New seat
- Succeeded by: William Francis Kennedy

Member of the Queensland Legislative Assembly for West Moreton
- In office 25 June 1870 – 18 November 1873 Serving with George Thorn, Jr., Frederick Forbes
- Preceded by: Samuel Hodgson
- Succeeded by: Seat abolished

Personal details
- Born: John Ferrett; 1812 Dorsetshire, England
- Died: 4 June 1894 (aged 81–82)
- Occupation: Pastoralist

John Ferrett (1812–1894) was a pastoralist and politician in Queensland, Australia. He was a Member of the Queensland Legislative Assembly.

== Early life ==
John Ferrett was born in 1812 in Dorset, England, the son of Harry Ferrett and his wife Mary (née Rabbit).

He immigrated to Sydney, New South Wales, Australia in 1835 on the Fairlie. He worked as a station hand with the Dangar family at Gostwyck Plains, before establishing Wallann Station with them at Ipswich, Queensland around 1844. He established Wooinble Bank in Maranoa in 1862.

== Politics ==
John Ferrett entered the Queensland Legislative Assembly on 4 May 1860 at the 1860 colonial election as the member for the electoral district of Maranoa. He held the seat until 27 June 1863 (the 1863 election).

On 13 June 1870, Samuel Hodgson, member for West Moreton, resigned. John Ferrett won the resulting by-election on 25 June 1870. He retained this seat in the 1870 and 1871 elections but was defeated in the 1873 election on 18 November 1873.

John Ferrett also served as a councillor on the Bundanba Divisional Board.

== Later life ==
In 1874, Ferrett purchased Dulacca Station. He also had a part ownership in the Woodend coal mines on the Bremer River.

John Ferrett died suddenly from heart disease on 4 June 1894 at his home in Roderick Street, Ipswich. He had never married and his closest relatives were his niece and nephew Emily and Harry Ferrett, the children of his late brother Henry Ferrett. His funeral was held on 5 June.

== See also ==
- Members of the Queensland Legislative Assembly, 1860–1863; 1868–1870; 1870–1871; 1871–1873

Parliament of Queensland
New seat	Member for Maranoa; 1860–1863	Succeeded by William Francis Kennedy
Preceded by Samuel Hodgson	Member for West Moreton; 1870–1873; Served alongside: George Thorn, Jr., Frederick Forbes	Abolished
