= St John the Baptist Anglican Church, Bulimba =

St John the Baptist Anglican Church
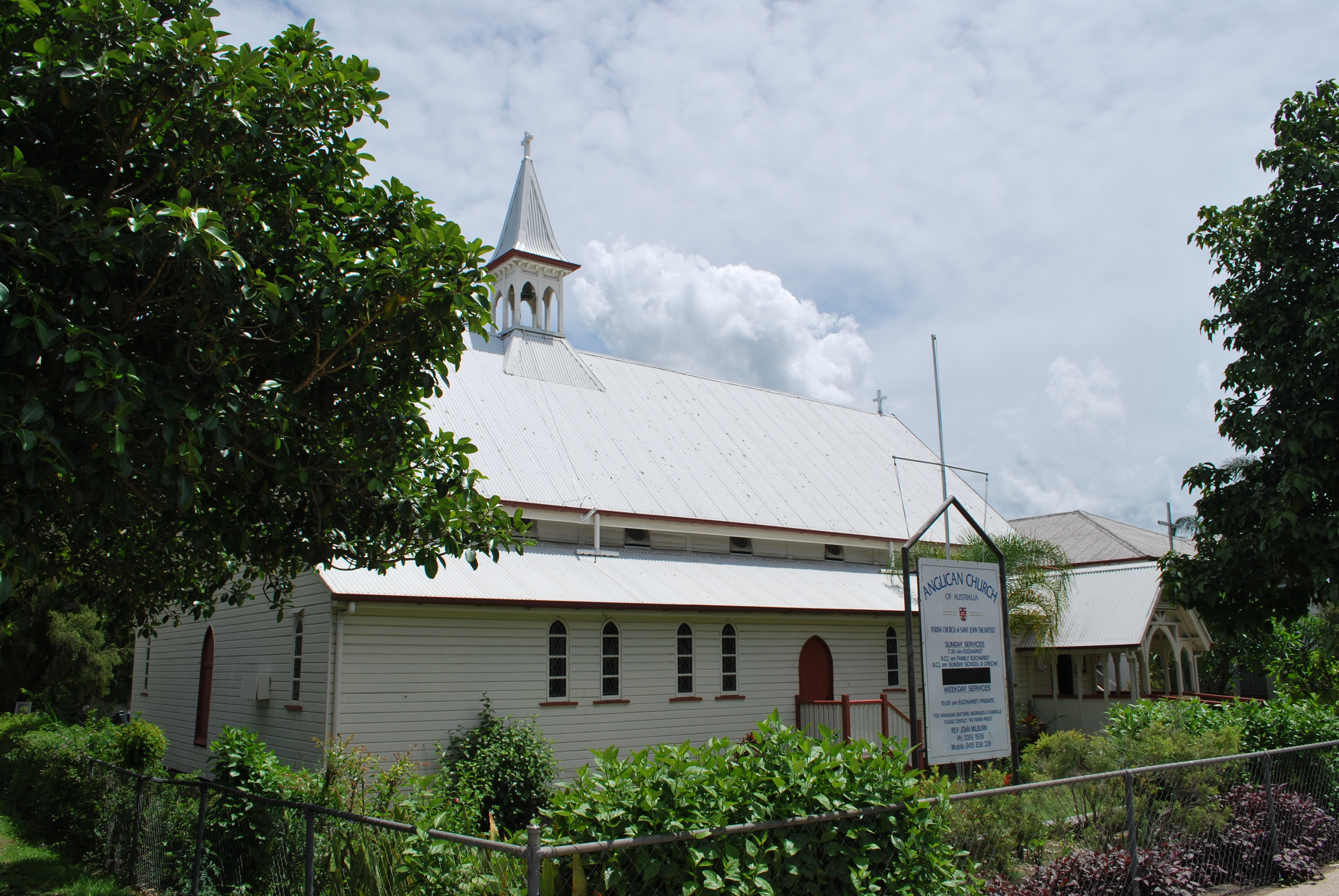
- Bulimba Anglican Church, 2008

- Location within Queensland Location within Australia
- 27.4517°S 153.0602°E
- Location: 171 Oxford Street, Bulimba, Brisbane, Queensland, Australia

History
- Design period: 1870s–1890s (late 19th century)
- Built: 1888–1930s circa

Site notes
- Architect: John Hingeston Buckeridge
- Architectural style: Gothic

Queensland Heritage Register
- Official name: St John the Baptist Anglican Church
- Type: state heritage (built)
- Designated: 9 July 2003
- Reference no.: 601174
- Significant period: 1880s–1890s (historical); 1880s–1930s (fabric)
- Significant components: tower – bell / belfry, church, furniture/fittings, stained glass window/s, views to
- Builders: T Whitty

St John the Baptist Anglican Church is a heritage-listed church at 171 Oxford Street, Bulimba, Brisbane, Queensland, Australia. It was designed by John Hingeston Buckeridge and built in 1888 by T Whitty. It was added to the Queensland Heritage Register on 9 July 2003.

Former Australian Prime Minister Kevin Rudd worshipped for many years at this church, being within his electorate of the Division of Griffith.

== History ==
St John the Baptist Anglican Church is a timber church constructed in 1888 and is prominently sited at an intersection of the main street of Bulimba.

European settlement of Bulimba began in the early 1850s with farming of small crops and fishing along the river. David McConnel built Bulimba House there, keeping cattle to acclimatize them before moving them to his pastoral property, Cressbrook, and growing maize and oats to feed them. In 1864 a large part of the Bulimba House land was subdivided into residential blocks. A ferry operated across the Brisbane River between Bulimba and the city from 1864 and, as the river provided the easiest route to Brisbane, it seems a natural progression that boat building began to develop as an industry in the area.

Initially the Anglican residents of Bulimba were members of St Andrews parish at South Brisbane and in October 1868 Christ Church Anglican at Tingalpa was dedicated after a committee of local residents, chaired by Charles Coxen, raised funds to erect a church to serve the Bulimba and Tingalpa areas.

By 1872 Bulimba was a postal township and from the 1870s the area gradually became more densely populated as it shared in the development boom of the 1880s. In 1881 the Presbyterians erected a church at Bulimba. In 1887 a grant of £25 was made toward building an Anglican church and Mrs Coxen put up a notice near the Bulimba ferry in 1887 calling a public meeting to seek support for the provision of regular local Anglican Services. As a result of the meeting, the Reverend H M Bannister commenced the Bulimba Mission. Religious services and a Sunday school were conducted in the local School of Arts.

Mrs Elizabeth Coxen donated land for a church in what is now Birkalla Street and also made a donation of £100 to the building fund. In 1888, this land was sold and the current, more central, site was purchased. Mrs Coxen died in 1906 and the church contains a memorial plaque and lectern commemorating this major benefactor.

John Hingeston Buckeridge, appointed Diocesan Architect in 1887, designed the new church. Buckeridge was born in England as the son of an ecclesiastical architect and was articled to leading ecclesiastical architect John Loughborough Pearson between 1874 and 1879, studying at the Royal Academy of Arts and the Architectural Association in London. He undertook important works for the Church in England before moving to Queensland for personal reasons and to supervise the proposed new Anglican cathedral to Pearson's design. Although work on the cathedral did not commence until after 1900, Dr William Webber, the Bishop of Brisbane, needed an architect to take charge of an ambitious building programme. It was intended to provide a series of "substantial and permanent churches in Queensland" to serve an expanding population. Although many of these churches could not be expensive, Buckeridge lifted them above the ordinary by quality of design and materials.

Lady Musgrave, wife of the Queensland Governor Anthony Musgrave, laid the first block of the new church at Bulimba on 23 June 1888. T Whitty constructed it at a cost of £700 and the first service was held there on 29 September 1888 on St Michael and All Angels Day, at which Archdeacon of Brisbane, Nathaniel Dawes, blessed the building. As Bishop of Brisbane William Webber was then overseas, the dedication service did not take place until 2 June 1889.

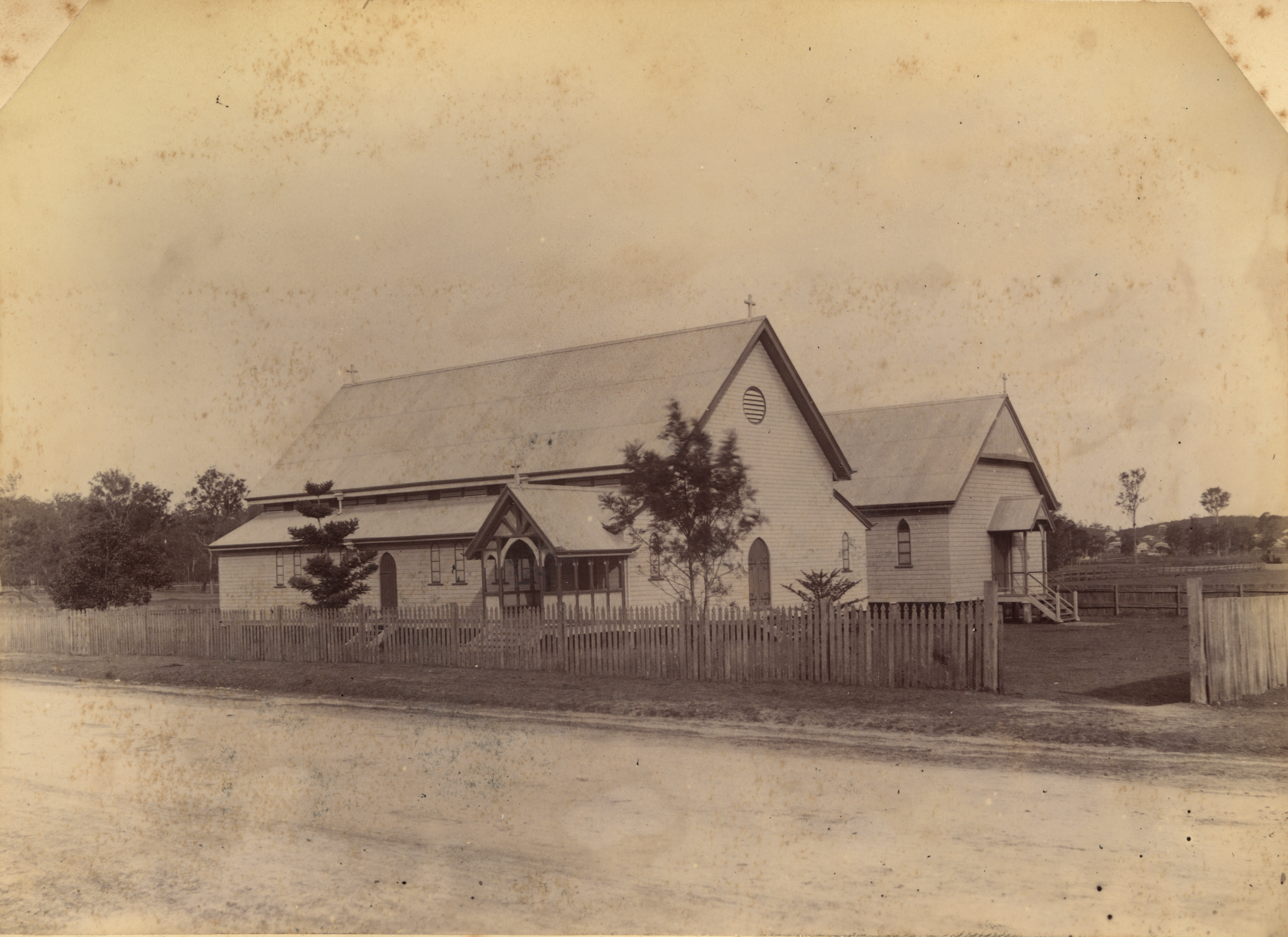
Hall behind the church

In 1893 the Bulimba Mission became part of Tingalpa parish and between 1900 and 1915 was under the direction of St John's Cathedral in the Brisbane CBD. In 1895, a Sunday school hall was built parallel to the church and behind it as seen from Oxford Street. This hall does not survive.

Many of the decorations and furnishings in the church were memorial gifts. They include the bell turret, constructed in 1915 in memory of Samuel and Mary Woodland and the pulpit given in memory of Corporal Frederick Storey who died at Gallipoli, which was installed in the same year. A small organ of unknown make was purchased from Lutwyche Park and installed in 1916.

Considerable works were carried out on the church in the 1930s, despite the straightened financial circumstances of the community in this period. A retaining wall was needed on the Oxford Street side of the site because the street level had been raised. This was constructed using Depression Relief labour. In 1936, the Reverend Thomas Tomlinson acquired a bell from the wrecked ship Maheno, which was installed in the belfry. A reredos and timber panelling were installed in the church in 1937, in time for its golden jubilee in the following year.

In the early 1950s, the timber screen was relocated from the chancel to the nave of the church and work was carried out on the organ, which was moved from the north to the south side of the building and converted to electricity. H W Jarrett carried out restoration work on the organ in 1978.

A brick parish hall was erected on land acquired further along Oxford Street in 1965 and was extended in 1986. The site of the original hall next to the church became a car park area.

== Description ==
The church is a landmark in Bulimba and occupies a level site on a prominent corner on the main street.

St John the Baptist church is a timber building with a corrugated iron roof. It is set on low brick piers and has a nave with side aisles open to the main body of the church. The nave is divided into seven bays by scissor trusses supported by stop-chamfered posts. A porch protects the main entrance at western end of the church and faces the street. Further entrances to the west, north and south sides are less prominent and all are accessed by low flights of steps. There is a car park on the southern side of the church.

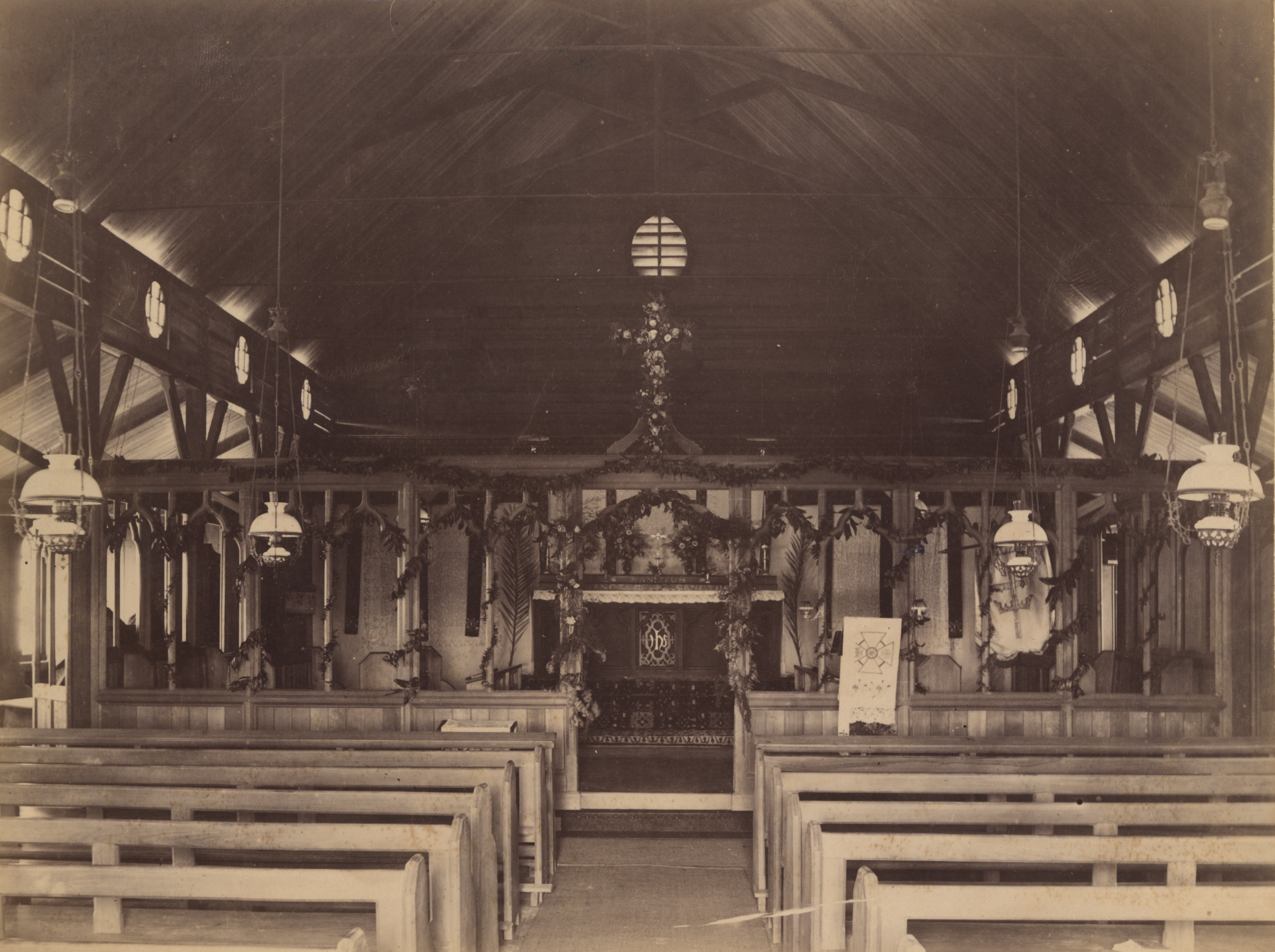
Interior of St. John the Baptist Church, circa 1888

The interior of the church has silky oak panelling and there is a timber chancel screen of a light and open design, which is now at the western end of the church. The interior is lit by lancet windows fitted with coloured glass and by small round windows set high in the wall on both sides of the nave.

== Heritage listing ==
St John the Baptist Anglican Church was listed on the Queensland Heritage Register on 9 July 2003 having satisfied the following criteria.

The place is important in demonstrating the evolution or pattern of Queensland's history.

As one of a series of churches designed by J H Buckeridge for the building programme instituted in the 1880s by Thomas Webber, Bishop of Brisbane, St John the Baptist church is evidence for the way in which the Anglican Church developed in Queensland during the nineteenth century. As the first Anglican church in the area it also reflects the development of Bulimba.

The place is important in demonstrating the principal characteristics of a particular class of cultural places.

St John the Baptist Anglican Church is a good and intact example of a timber church of its era.

The place is important because of its aesthetic significance.

In its form, scale and detail it makes a substantial visual contribution to the built character of Bulimba.

The place has a strong or special association with a particular community or cultural group for social, cultural or spiritual reasons.

St John the Baptist Anglican Church has served Bulimba and the surrounding area since 1888 and continues to play an important role in the life of the community as the venue for shared religious and social experiences.

The place has a special association with the life or work of a particular person, group or organisation of importance in Queensland's history.

St John the Baptist Anglican Church has a special association with the life and work of the Diocesan Architect, J H Buckeridge, and Bishop Webber, whose vision for the developing Church in Queensland encompassed the construction of new buildings of substance and quality.
