= Elizabeth Coxen =

Australian museum curator, meteorologist and specimen collector

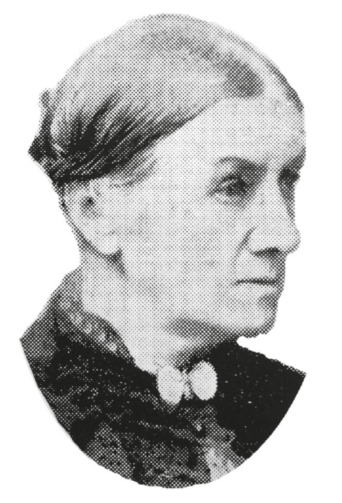
Coxen, before 1906

Elizabeth Frances Coxen (née Isaac 1825–1906) was an English-born Australian naturalist and meteorologist. She made many contributions to the Queensland Museum and served as its curator. She was the first woman elected a member of the Royal Society of Queensland.

== Biography ==
She was born Elizabeth Frances Isaac in Marshfield, Gloucestershire, England, in 1825, the eldest daughter of George Frederick Isaac, solicitor, and his wife Elizabeth, née Fromow. When she was 13, Coxen emigrated with her family to Sydney, Colony of New South Wales, Australia.

By 1847, Elizabeth had met her future husband Charles Coxen as he had come to town with cattle during one of the floods. On 27 December 1851, Elizabeth, aged 26, married Charles at St Ann’s Church of England, Ryde, Sydney and the couple settled in Bimbian. In 1860, he became a politician and was elected as member for the Northern Downs in Queensland’s first parliament and he held the seat until 1867.

She and her husband collected numerous shells, insects and birds, and they donated many specimens to the Queensland Museum where Elizabeth worked as curator and was the first person to be paid to oversee any part of the museum’s invertebrate collections. After her husband's death, she became the first female elected a member of the Royal Society of Queensland. By the 1890s, she was one of several women members of the Royal Society; the majority were teachers and included Eliza Fewing.

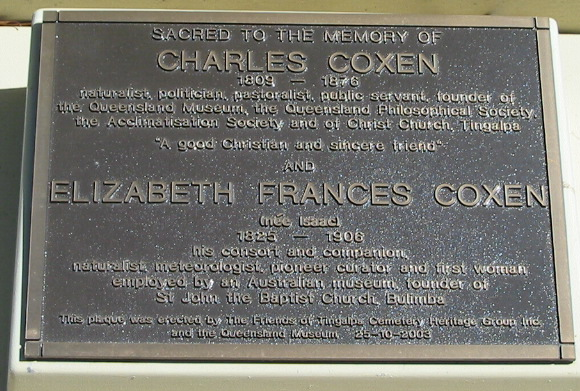
Coxen joint headstone, 2005

Elizabeth Coxen died in Brisbane on 11 August 1906 and was buried with her husband in the cemetery of Christ Church in Tingalpa. Her friends commissioned a plaque commemorating her at St John the Baptist Anglican Church at Bulimba. She is commemorated in the name of the land snail Spurlingia coxenae (now known as Spurlingia dunkiensis).
