= Members of the Queensland Legislative Assembly, 1870–1871 =

This is a list of members of the 5th Legislative Assembly of Queensland from 1870 to 1871, as elected at the 1870 colonial elections held between 27 July 1870 and 15 September 1870 (due to problems of distance and communications, it was not possible to hold the elections on a single day).

Name	Electorate	Term in office
Robert Travers Atkin	East Moreton	1868–1869; 1870–1872
Joshua Peter Bell	Northern Downs	1862–1879
John Bramston^{[1]}	Burnett	1871–1873
Benjamin Cribb	Town of Ipswich	1861–1867; 1870–1873
Oscar de Satge	Clermont	1869–1870; 1870–1872; 1873–1877; 1881–1882
George Edmondstone	Town of Brisbane	1860–1867; 1869–1877
John Ferrett	West Moreton	1860–1863; 1870–1873
Frederick Forbes	West Moreton	1860–1863; 1865–1867; 1868–1873
Alexander Fyfe	Rockhampton	1870–1873
William Henry Groom	Drayton and Toowoomba	1862–1901
Charles Robert Haly^{[1]}	Burnett	1860–1863; 1865–1867; 1869–1871; 1876–1878
John Handy	Mitchell	1870–1871; 1872–1873
John Johnston	Town of Ipswich	1870–1872
Henry Jordan	East Moreton	1860; 1868–1871; 1883–1890
Henry Edward King	Wide Bay	1870–1871; 1871–1873; 1874–1883
Charles Lilley	Hamlet of Fortitude Valley	1860–1873
Arthur Macalister	Eastern Downs	1860–1871; 1872–1876
Edward MacDevitt	Kennedy	1870–1874
Thomas McIlwraith	Warrego	1870–1871; 1873–1886; 1888–1896
William Miles	Maranoa	1864–1873; 1874–1875; 1876–1887
Berkeley Basil Moreton	Burnett	1870–1871; 1873–1875; 1883–1888
James Morgan	Warwick	1870–1871; 1873–1878
Kevin O'Doherty	Town of Brisbane	1867–1873
Arthur Hunter Palmer	Port Curtis	1866–1881
Ratcliffe Pring	Town of Brisbane	1860–1862; 1863–1866; 1867–1872; 1873–1874; 1878–1879
Robert Ramsay	Western Downs	1867–1873
Charles Royds	Leichhardt	1860–1864; 1868–1872
John Scott	Leichhardt	1868, 1870–1888
Thomas Blacket Stephens	Town of South Brisbane	1863–1875
John Malbon Thompson	Town of Ipswich	1868–1881
George Thorn	West Moreton	1867–1874; 1876–1878; 1879–1883; 1887–1888; 1893–1902
William Henry Walsh	Maryborough	1865–1878
Edward Wienholt	Western Downs	1870–1875

== See also ==
- Premier:

Arthur Hunter Palmer (1870–1874)

== Notes ==
^{1} On 23 March 1871, Charles Haly, member for Burnett, resigned. John Bramston won the resulting by-election on 3 April 1871.
