= Electoral district of Murilla =

Murilla Queensland—Legislative Assembly
- State: Queensland
- Created: 1888
- Abolished: 1935
- Namesake: Shire of Murilla
- Demographic: Rural
- Coordinates: 27°0′S 150°0′E

The electoral district of Murilla was a Legislative Assembly electorate in the state of Queensland, Australia.

== History ==
Murilla was created by a redistribution, taking effect at the 1888 colonial election, and existed until the 1935 state election. It was based in the western Darling Downs adjoining the New South Wales border and included the localities of Taroom, Miles, Surat, Murilla and Goondiwindi.

When Murilla was abolished in 1935, its area was incorporated into the districts of Normanby, Dalby and Carnarvon.

== Members ==
The following people were elected in the seat of Murilla:

Member	Party	Term
Hugh Nelson	Ministerial	Apr 1888 – Apr 1898
William Moore	Ministerial	May 1898 – Aug 1904
Thomas Scott	Labor / Ministerial	Aug 1904 – May 1907
William Moore	Kidstonites	May 1907 – Oct 1909
Godfrey Morgan	Liberal	Oct 1909 – May 1935

Nelson previously represented Northern Downs (1883–1888).
Morgan subsequently represented Dalby (1935–1938).
