= Samuel Hodgson =

Australian politician

Member of the Queensland Legislative Assembly for West Moreton
- In office 28 September 1868 – 13 June 1870 Serving with George Thorn, Jr., Frederick Forbes
- Preceded by: Patrick O'Sullivan
- Succeeded by: John Ferrett

Member of the Queensland Legislative Council
- In office 6 November 1871 – 16 April 1872

Personal details
- Born: Samuel Hodgson; 1838 England
- Died: 1886 (aged 47–48) Isle of Man
- Spouse: Margaret Lucinda Forbes (b.1867)
- Occupation: Businessman

Samuel Hodgson (1838 – 29 November 1886) was both a member of the Queensland Legislative Council and the Queensland Legislative Assembly.

Hodgson was born in England in 1838. He arrived in Queensland in 1863 and within a year, he was a partner in a firm trading as Clarke, Hodgson & Co. He entered politics in 1868, winning the seat of West Moreton, holding it till 1870. A year later, Hodgson was appointed to the Queensland Legislative Council but resigned just six months later.

Hodgson left to return to England in 1886 but died at his home Ellenbrooke, on the Isle of Man later that year.

Parliament of Queensland
Preceded by Patrick O'Sullivan	Member for West Moreton; 1868–1870; Served alongside: George Thorn, Jr., Frederick Forbes	Succeeded by John Ferrett
