= Hugh Nelson (Australian politician) =

Australian politician (1833–1906)

The Right Honourable Sir Hugh Nelson KCMG
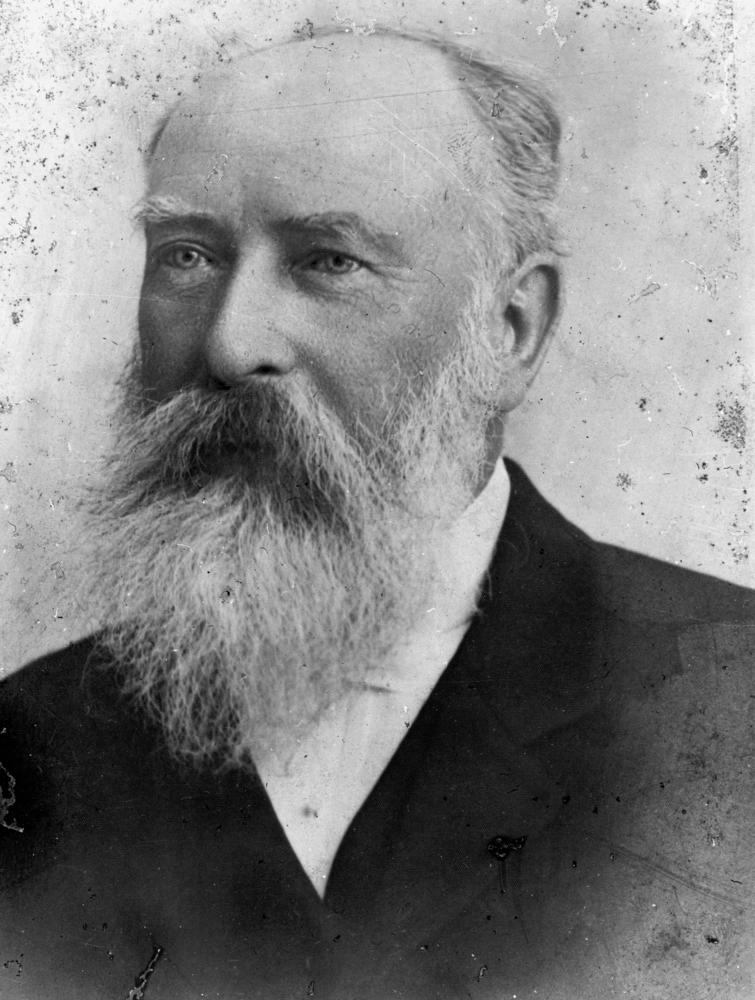

11th Premier of Queensland
- In office 27 October 1893 – 13 April 1898
- Preceded by: Sir Thomas McIlwraith
- Succeeded by: Thomas Joseph Byrnes
- Constituency: Murilla

17th Treasurer of Queensland
- In office 27 March 1893 – 2 March 1898
- Preceded by: Thomas McIlwraith
- Succeeded by: Robert Philp
- Constituency: Murilla

Member of the Queensland Legislative Assembly for Northern Downs
- In office 7 September 1883 – 28 April 1888
- Preceded by: George Thorn Jr
- Succeeded by: Seat abolished

Member of the Queensland Legislative Assembly for Murilla
- In office 28 April 1888 – 13 April 1898
- Preceded by: New seat
- Succeeded by: William Moore

Member of the Queensland Legislative Council
- In office 13 April 1898 – 1 January 1906

Personal details
- Born: 31 December 1833 Kilmarnock, Scotland, UK
- Died: 1 January 1906 (aged 72) Toowoomba, Queensland, Australia
- Resting place: Drayton and Toowoomba Cemetery
- Party: Ministerialist
- Spouse: Janet McIntyre
- Relations: William Nelson (father)
- Occupation: Dairy farmer, Sheep breeder, Station Hand

Sir Hugh Muir Nelson, KCMG (31 December 1833 – 1 January 1906) was an Australian politician who was Premier of Queensland from 1893 to 1898.

Hugh Nelson was born at Kilmarnock, Scotland, the son of William Lambie Nelson. Nelson died at Toowoomba on 1 January 1906.

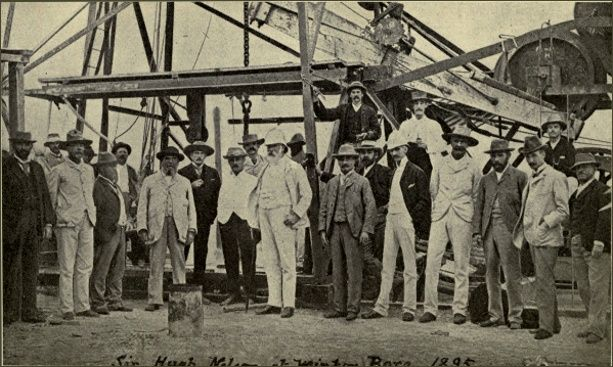
Sir Hugh Nelson (centre, in white) visited Winton in 1895. Here he is seen at the town's artesian bore.

== Notes ==
Political offices
| Preceded by Sir Thomas McIlwraith | Premier of Queensland; 1893–1898 | Succeeded by T.J. Byrnes |
Parliament of Queensland
| Preceded by George Thorn Jr | Member for Northern Downs; 1883–1888 | Abolished |
| New seat | Member for Murilla; 1888–1898 | Succeeded by William Moore |
