= Warrill View, Queensland =

Warrill View
- Town
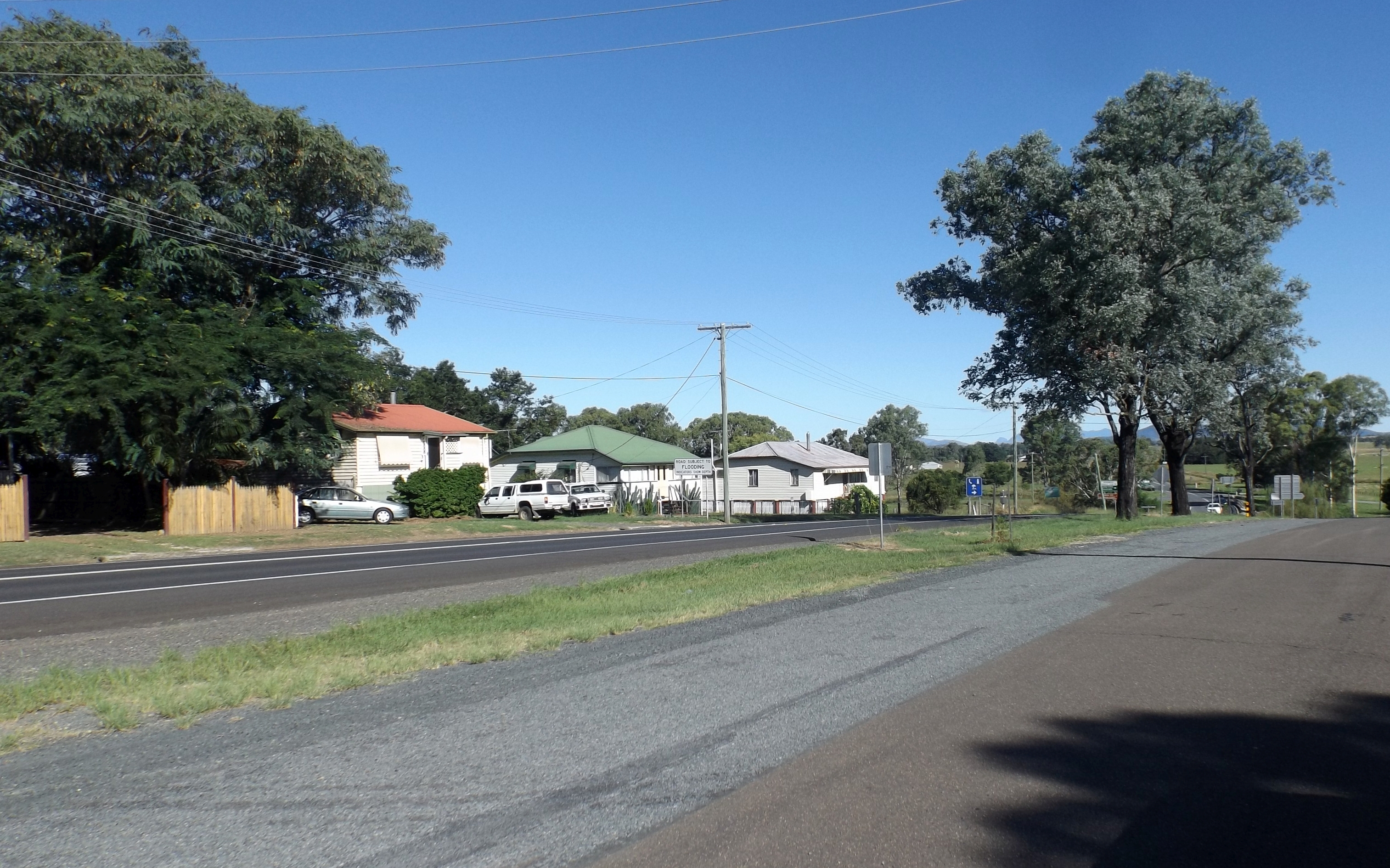
- Cunningham Highway at Warrill View, 2015

- Interactive map of Warrill View
- Coordinates: 27.8225°S 152.615°E
- Country: Australia
- State: Queensland
- LGA: Scenic Rim Region
- Location: 28.2 km (17.5 mi) N of Boonah; 28.9 km (18.0 mi) S of Rosewood; 32.0 km (19.9 mi) SW of Ipswich; 59.1 km (36.7 mi) NW of Beaudesert; 71.1 km (44.2 mi) SW of Brisbane

Government
  - State electorate: Scenic Rim
  - Federal division: Wright

Area
  - Total: 33.2 km^{2} (12.8 sq mi)
- Elevation: 65 m (213 ft)

Population
  - Total: 203 (2021 census)
  - Density: 6.114/km^{2} (15.84/sq mi)
- Time zone: UTC+10:00 (AEST)
- Postcode: 4307
Localities around Warrill View
Coleyville	Coleyville	Harrisville
Coleyville	Warrill View	Wilsons Plains
Rosevale	Silverdale	Radford

Warrill View is a rural town and locality in the Scenic Rim Region, Queensland, Australia. In the 2021 census, the locality of Warrill View had a population of 203 people.

== Geography ==
Warrill View is located in the Fassifern Valley farming area. The Cunningham Highway passes through Warrill View. Warrill Creek is a tributary of the Bremer River.

== History ==
Botanist Allan Cunningham explored this area in 1829. From a knoll, he saw extensive plains which he named Laidley Plain after colonial administrator James Laidley who was the Deputy Commissary General in Sydney at that time.

The town was called Normanby from about 1859 to 1931. However, that caused confusion with another town called Normanby on the road from Ipswich to Harrisville, resulting in this town being renamed Warrill View, a name that was already in use for the school and post office. The name Warrill comes from the name of the local creek, whose name is allegedly an Aboriginal word meaning water or stream.

Warrill View State School opened on 15 September 1910.

Warrill View Baptist Church was established in 1951, having been relocated from Kulgun, where it was called Siloam Baptist Church. It was built from timber. It closed in 1975 and sold 1980. It was at 4725 Cunningham Highway (27.823405°S 152.6164°E).

== Demographics ==
In the 2011 census, the locality of Warrill View had a population of 321 people.

In the 2016 census, the locality of Warrill View had a population of 240 people.

In the 2021 census, the locality of Warrill View had a population of 203 people.

== Heritage listings ==
Warrill View has a number of heritage-listed sites, including:

- Normanby Homestead, Cunningham Highway

== Education ==
Warrill View State School is a government primary (Prep–6) school for boys and girls at 7–19 Ipswich Street (27.8229°S 152.6160°E). In 2017, the school had an enrolment of 11 students with 6 teachers (2 full-time equivalent) and 5 non-teaching staff (3 full-time equivalent). In 2022, the school had an enrolment of 22 students.

There are no secondary schools in Warrill View. The nearest government secondary schools are Rosewood State High School in Rosewood to the north and Boonah State High School in Boonah to the south.

== Attractions ==
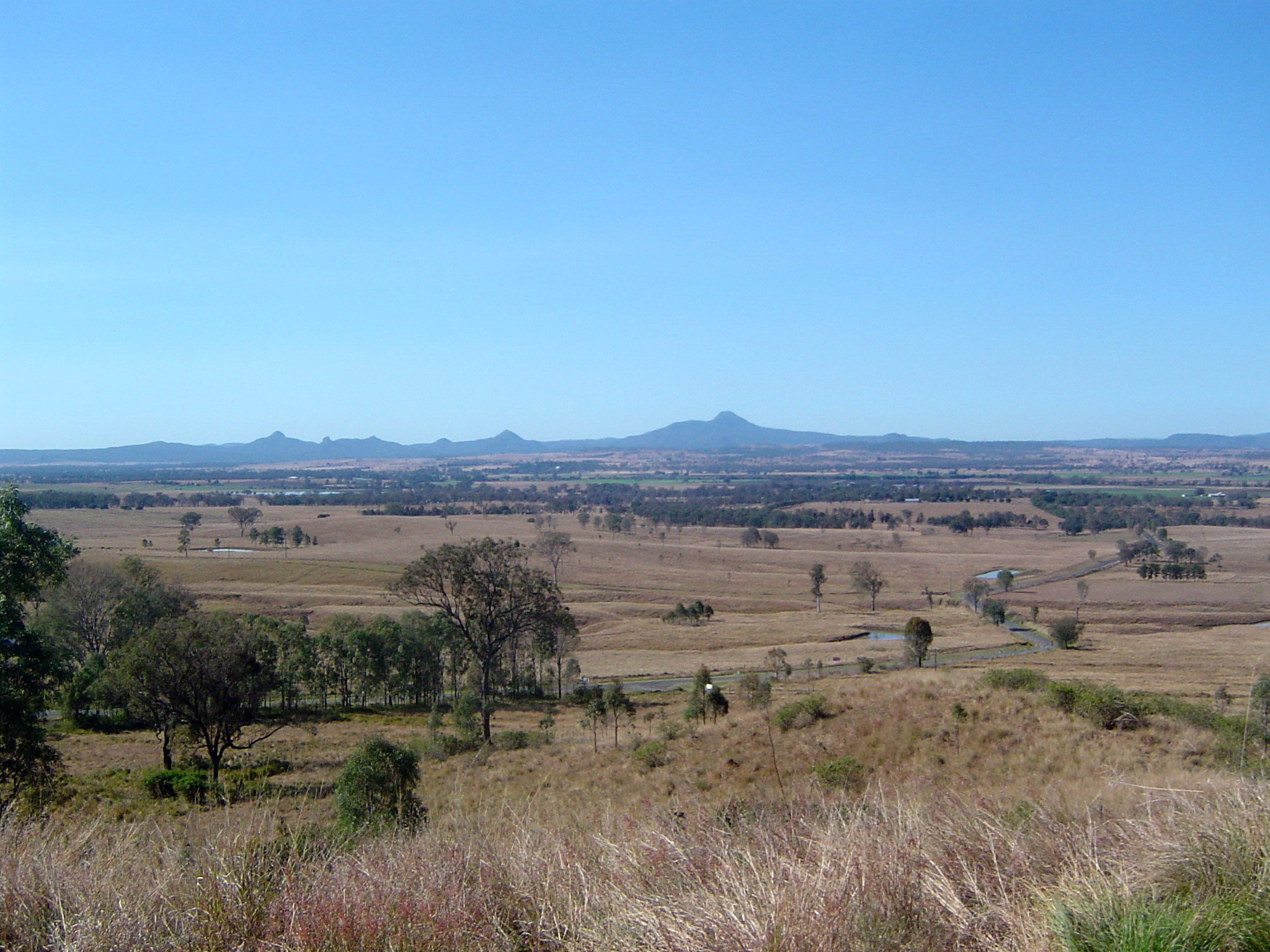
View towards the town as seen from Cunninghams Lookout, 2011

Cunninghams Lookout is on the knoll from which botanist Allan Cunningham named Laidley Plain (27.8223°S 152.5833°E). It provides panoramic views. It is off to the south of Rosewood Warrill View Road.

== Streets in Warrill View ==
- Audley St
- Bath St
- Cunningham Hwy
- Harsant Rd
- Ipswich St
- Old Rosevale Rd
- Rosewood Warrill View Rd
- Service Rd
- Stapylton Rd
- Warrill View Peak Crossing Rd
- Warwick St
- Willmotts Rd
