= William Francis Kennedy =

Australian politician

William Kennedy JP

Member of the Queensland Legislative Assembly for Maranoa
- In office 27 Jun 1863 – 28 Jul 1864
- Preceded by: John Ferrett
- Succeeded by: William Miles

Personal details
- Born: William Francis Kennedy
- Died: 1 January 1874 England
- Spouse: Catherine Ann Veronica Cosgrove
- Occupation: Sheep farmer

William Francis Kennedy (died 1 January 1874) was a member of the Queensland Legislative Assembly.

== Biography ==
Nothing is known of his early life - He arrived in Queensland in 1841 and pioneered the Tiereyboo run. He was declared insolvent in 1864 and lost Tiereyboo.

Kennedy married Catherine Ann Veronica Cosgrove and together had 3 sons and one daughter. He returned to England and died there in January 1874.

== Public career ==
Kennedy was the member for Maranoa in the Queensland Legislative Assembly from 1863 until the election was declared void in 1864. He was appointed JP of Nebo in Central Queensland from 1867 to 1868.

Parliament of Queensland
Preceded by John Ferrett	Member for Maranoa; 1863–1864	Succeeded by William Miles
