= William Moore (Queensland politician) =

Australian politician

Member of the Queensland Legislative Assembly for Murilla
- In office 28 May 1898 – 27 August 1904
- Preceded by: Hugh Nelson
- Succeeded by: Thomas Scott
- In office 18 May 1907 – 2 Oct 1909
- Preceded by: Thomas Scott
- Succeeded by: Godfrey Morgan

Personal details
- Born: William John Harlin Moore; 10 September 1866 Brighton, Victoria
- Died: 14 October 1933 (aged 67) Ormiston, Queensland, Australia
- Resting place: Toowong Cemetery
- Party: Ministerial
- Other political affiliations: Opposition
- Spouse: Lillian Mary O'Hara
- Occupation: Pastoral farmer

William John Harlin Moore (10 September 1866 - 14 October 1933) was a member of the Queensland Legislative Assembly.

== Early life ==
Moore was born at Boort Cottage, Brighton, Victoria, the son of John Moore and his wife Charlotte (née Harlin). He was educated at Ipswich State and Boys' Grammar Schools and in Queensland and Hurstville College in New South Wales. He was a stock buyer for the Queensland Mercantile Company in 1885 and then took up pastoral pursuits.

He married Lillian Mary O'Hara. Moore died in October 1933 and his funeral moved from the funeral parlour of Alex Gow at Petrie Bight to the Toowong Cemetery.

== Public life ==
Moore won the seat of Murilla in the Queensland Legislative Assembly at the by-election in 1898 to replace Hugh Nelson who had been appointed to the Legislative Council. He held the seat until 1904 when he did not stand.

He was returned as member again however at the 1907 state election and retired two years later.

Parliament of Queensland
Preceded by Hugh Nelson	Member for Murilla; 1898–1904	Succeeded by Thomas Scott
Preceded by Thomas Scott	Member for Murilla; 1907–1909	Succeeded by Godfrey Morgan
