= Thomas Scott (Australian politician) =

Australian politician

Member of the Queensland Legislative Assembly for Murilla
- In office 27 August 1904 – 18 May 1907
- Preceded by: William Moore
- Succeeded by: William Moore

Personal details
- Born: Thomas Alison Scott; 1865 Maitland, New South Wales, Australia
- Died: 21 October 1946 (aged 80-81) Brisbane, Queensland, Australia
- Resting place: Lutwyche Cemetery
- Party: Kidstonites
- Other political affiliations: Labour Party
- Spouse: Eva Zerbe (m.1887 d.1914)
- Occupation: Pastoral farmer

Thomas Alison Scott (1865 - 21 October 1946) was a member of the Queensland Legislative Assembly.

== Early life ==
Scott was born at Maitland, New South Wales, the son of Andrew Scott and his wife Christina (née Brodie). He took up pastoral pursuits and by 1922 was a hotel manager. In 1937 he was working as a caretaker in Mooloolah.

On the 27 Oct 1887 he married Eva Zerbe (died 1914) with the marriage producing five sons and three daughters. Scott died in October 1946 and his funeral moved from the funeral parlour of K.M. Smith at Fortitude Valley to the Lutwyche Cemetery.

== Public life ==
Scott, representing the Labour Party, won the seat of Murilla in the Queensland Legislative Assembly at the 1904 Queensland state election. He held the seat until 1907 by which time he had joined the Kidstonites.

Parliament of Queensland
Preceded by William Moore	Member for Murilla; 1904–1907	Succeeded by William Moore
