= De Burgh Fitzpatrick Persse =

Australian politician

De Burgh Persse
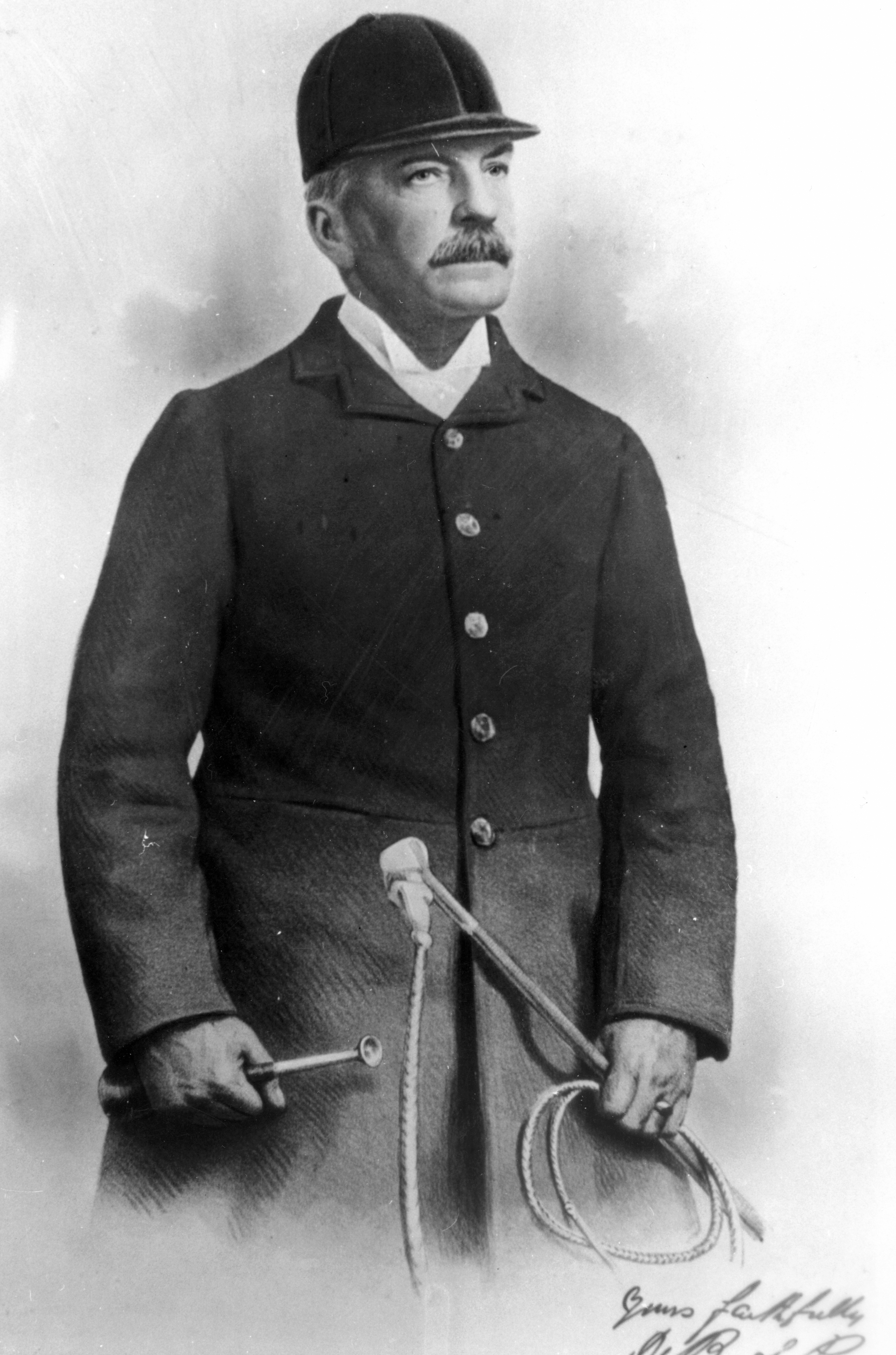
- De Burgh Fitzpatrick Persse

Member of the Queensland Legislative Assembly for Fassifern
- In office 9 April 1878 – 7 September 1883
- Preceded by: John Thorn
- Succeeded by: Alfred Midgley

Personal details
- Born: De Burgh Fitzpatrick Persse; 25 September 1840 Moyode Castle, County Galway, Ireland
- Died: 17 February 1921 (aged 80) Southport, Queensland, Australia
- Resting place: Beaudesert Cemetery
- Spouse: Mary Persse Blair (m.1871 d.1923)
- Education: Trinity College, Dublin
- Occupation: Station manager

De Burgh Fitzpatrick Persse (25 September 1840 – 17 February 1921) was a politician in Queensland, Australia. He was a Member of the Queensland Legislative Assembly.

== Early life ==
De Burgh Fitzpatrick Persse was born on 25 September 1840 in Moyode Castle, County Galway, Ireland.

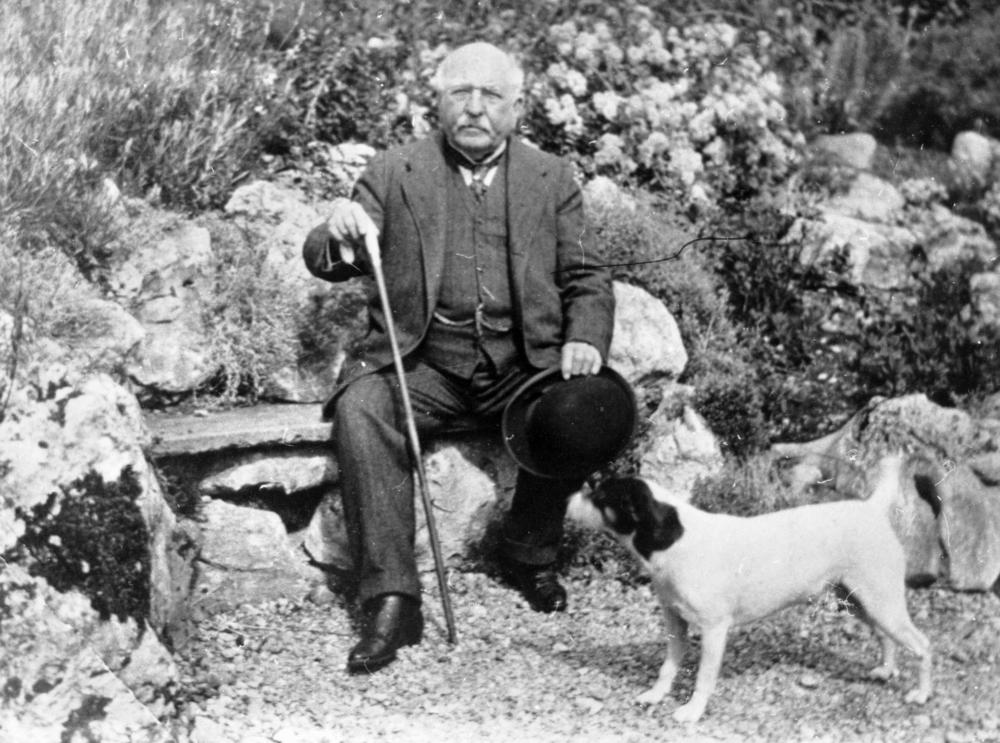
Pastoralist and politician De Burgh Fitzpatrick Persse, ca. 1920

== Politics ==
Presse was the Member of the Queensland Legislative Assembly for Fassifern from 9 April 1878 to 7 September 1883.

== Later life ==
Persse died on 17 February 1921 in Southport, Queensland, Australia. He was buried in Beaudesert on the local cemetery. He left his wife and two sons, Charles Persse and De Burgh B. Persse. and three daughters, Mrs. Fitz Pierce Joyce, Mrs. Edgar Joyce and Mrs. Cecil Delpratt.

Parliament of Queensland
Preceded by John Thorn	Member for Fassifern; 1878–1883	Succeeded by Alfred Midgley
