= Frederick Augustus Forbes =

Australian politician (1818–1878)

The Honourable Frederick Forbes
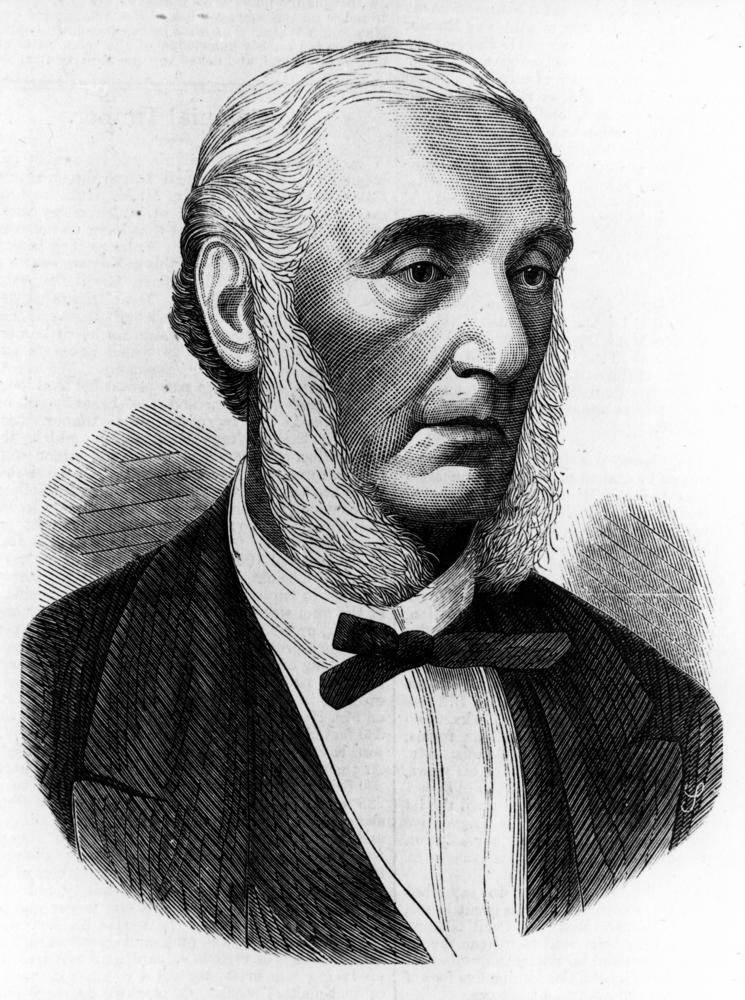

Speaker of the Queensland Parliament
- In office 7 November 1871 – 1 September 1873
- Preceded by: Arthur Macalister
- Succeeded by: William Henry Walsh
- Constituency: West Moreton

Member of the Queensland Legislative Assembly for Ipswich
- In office 10 May 1860 – 30 May 1863 Serving with Patrick O'Sullivan, Arthur Macalister
- Preceded by: New seat
- Succeeded by: Ratcliffe Pring

Member of the Queensland Legislative Assembly for Warrego
- In office 25 March 1865 – 8 July 1867
- Preceded by: New seat
- Succeeded by: Graham Mylne

Member of the Queensland Legislative Assembly for West Moreton
- In office 28 September 1868 – 18 November 1873 Serving with George Thorn, Jr., Samuel Hodgson, John Ferrett
- Preceded by: Joshua Peter Bell
- Succeeded by: Seat abolished

Personal details
- Born: 30 September 1818 Liverpool, New South Wales
- Died: 9 July 1878 (aged 59) Ipswich, Queensland
- Spouse: Margaret Milner
- Occupation: Storekeeper, Grazier

Frederick Augustus Forbes (30 September 1818 – 9 July 1878) was a politician in colonial Queensland and Speaker of the Legislative Assembly of Queensland.

== Early life ==
Forbes was born on 30 September 1818 in Liverpool, Sydney, New South Wales, to Francis Ewen, a merchant, and his wife Mary Ann Taboweur. He attended William Cape's school and The King's School, Parramatta, before spending several years at sea. When his father died he took over his father's store in Liverpool in 1842 before marrying Margaret Milner in 1844.

== Politics ==
Forbes soon moved to Ipswich where he opened another store and became involved in the Queensland Separation movement. Forbes became involved in politics and in 1860, along with Arthur Macalister and Patrick O'Sullivan, was elected to the new seat of Ipswich in the Queensland Legislative Assembly which he served until his defeat in 1863. He later served in the seat of Warrego from March 1865 to June 1867 and the seat of West Moreton from September 1868 until his retirement in November 1873. During this final term, Forbes spent two years as Speaker from 1871 to 1873.

== Later life ==
Though Forbes declared bankruptcy in 1870 because of the 1866–67 money crisis, he managed to quickly rebuild and was able to continue investing in businesses until his death. Forbes died as a result of an accident at Ipswich, Queensland, 9 July 1878 at the age of 59 and was survived by eleven out of his seventeen children.

== See also ==
- Members of the Queensland Legislative Assembly, 1860–1863; 1863–1867; 1868–1870; 1870–1871; 1871–1873

Parliament of Queensland
Preceded by Arthur Macalister	Speaker of the Legislative Assembly; 1871 – 1873	Succeeded by William Henry Walsh
New seat	Member for Ipswich; 1860 - 1863; Served alongside: Patrick O'Sullivan, Arthur Macalister	Succeeded by Ratcliffe Pring
New seat	Member for Warrego; 1865 - 1867	Succeeded by Graham Mylne
Preceded by Joshua Peter Bell	Member for West Moreton; 1868 - 1873; Served alongside: George Thorn, Jr., Samuel Hodgson, John Ferrett	Abolished
