= Henry Thorn =

Australian politician

Member of the Queensland Legislative Assembly for Northern Downs
- In office 1 July 1867 – 28 September 1868
- Preceded by: Charles Coxen
- Succeeded by: Joshua Peter Bell
- In office 11 November 1873 – 30 October 1876
- Preceded by: Joshua Peter Bell
- Succeeded by: William Miles

Personal details
- Born: Henry Thorn; 6 November 1840 Ipswich, Queensland, Australia
- Died: 19 April 1880 (aged 39) Ipswich, Queensland, Australia
- Resting place: Ipswich General Cemetery
- Spouse: Rebecca Willis
- Relations: George Thorn Sr. (father), John Thorn (brother), George Thorn Jr. (brother)
- Occupation: Cattle station manager

Henry Thorn (6 November 1840 – 19 April 1880) was a politician in Queensland, Australia. He was a Member of the Queensland Legislative Assembly.

== Early life ==
Henry Thorn was born on 6 November 1840 in Ipswich, Queensland, the son of George Thorn (senior), a Member of the Queensland Legislative Assembly, and his wife Jane (née Handcock).

== Politics ==
At the 1867 colonial election, Thorn was elected to the Queensland Legislative Assembly in the electoral district of Northern Downs. He held the seat until following election 16 months later, when he was defeated by Joshua Peter Bell.

At the 1873 election, he won back the seat of Northern Downs, which he held until he resigned on 30 October 1876. William Miles won the resulting by-election on 14 November 1876.

== Later life ==
Thorn died on 19 April 1880 at Ipswich and was buried in the Anglican section of Ipswich General Cemetery.

== See also ==
- Members of the Queensland Legislative Assembly, 1867–1868
- Members of the Queensland Legislative Assembly, 1873–1878

Parliament of Queensland
Preceded by Charles Coxen	Member for Northern Downs; 1867–1868	Succeeded by Joshua Peter Bell
Preceded by Joshua Peter Bell	Member for Northern Downs; 1873–1876	Succeeded by William Miles
