= Christ Church, Tingalpa =

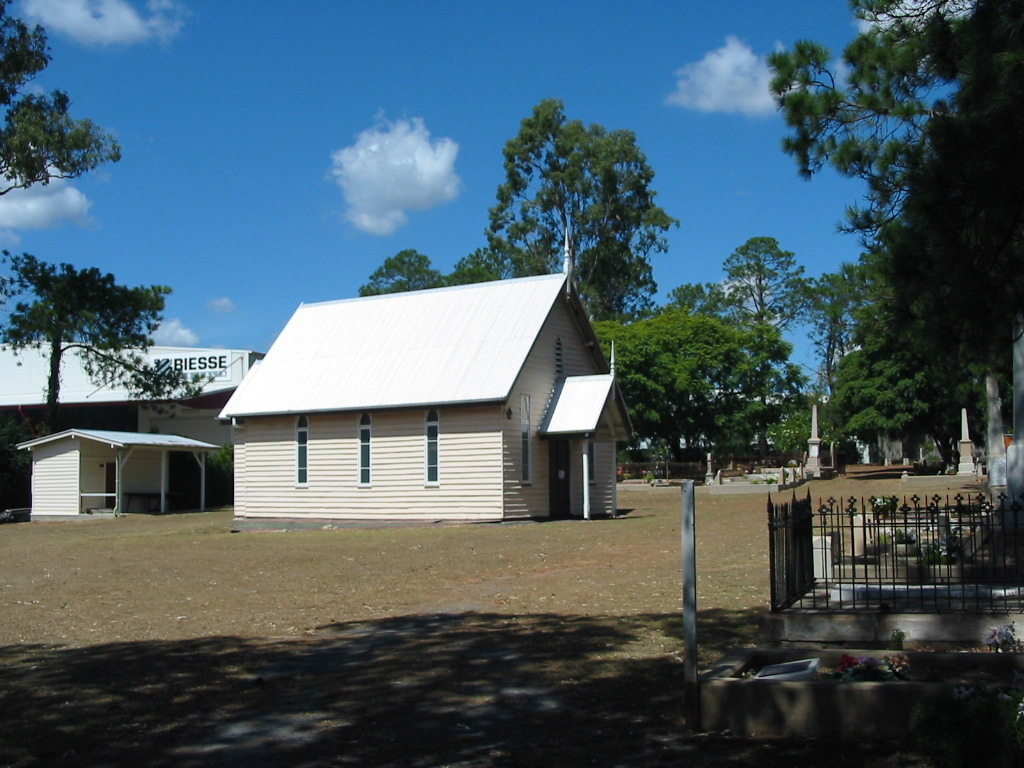
- Christ Church, Tingalpa, 2005

- Location within Queensland Location within Australia
- 27.473°S 153.1117°E
- Location: 1341 Wynnum Road, Tingalpa, City of Brisbane, Queensland, Australia

History
- Design period: 1840s - 1860s (mid-19th century)
- Built: 1868 - 1993

Queensland Heritage Register
- Official name: Christ Church Tingalpa and Burial Ground
- Type: state heritage (built)
- Designated: 2 February 1998
- Reference no.: 601799
- Significant period: 1868-1993 (fabric, and historical cemetery use); 1886- c. 1996 (historical, use of current church)
- Significant components: headstone, grave surrounds/railings, church, trees/plantings, burial/grave

Christ Church Tingalpa and Burial Ground is a heritage-listed former Anglican church at 1341 Wynnum Road, Tingalpa, City of Brisbane, Queensland, Australia. It was built from 1868 to 1993. It is now known as the Pioneer Wedding Chapel. It was added to the Queensland Heritage Register on 2 February 1998.

== History ==
The present Christ Church Tingalpa was erected in 1886 for the Anglican parish of Tingalpa, replacing an 1868 church designed by Brisbane architect Richard George Suter and demolished during the cyclone of 5 December 1885. It is understood that materials salvaged from the wreckage of the 1868 church were used to construct the second, smaller building.

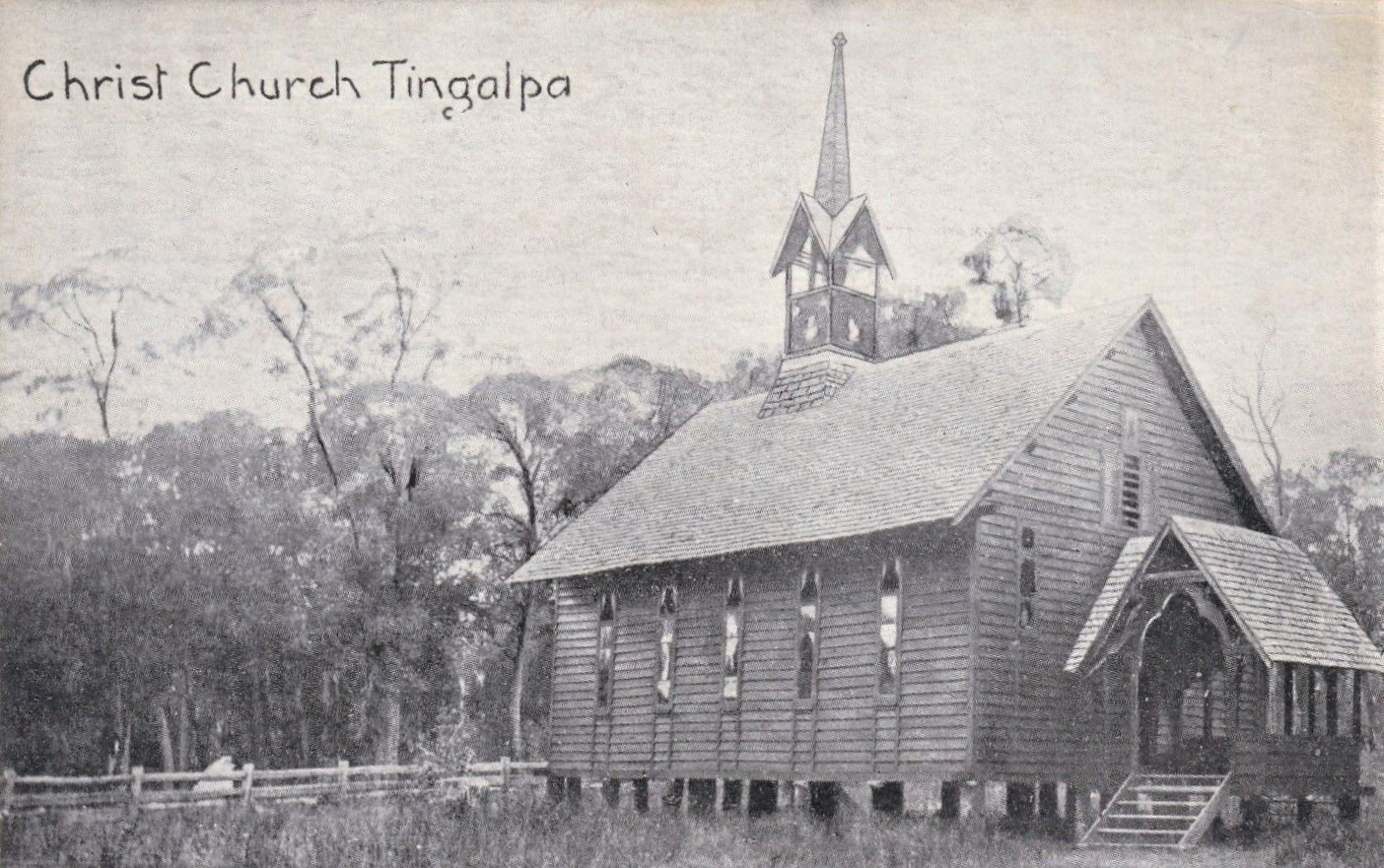
First Christ Church, Tingalpa, 1868

Built and consecrated in 1868, the original Christ Church at Tingalpa was the first Anglican Church established between Kangaroo Point and Moreton Bay, pre-dating St Paul's at Cleveland (1873–74), St John the Baptist's at Bulimba (1888) and St Peter's at Wynnum (1898). Initially part of St Mary's at Kangaroo Point parish, the parish of Tingalpa was established by 1886.

The Tingalpa site, one acre of high ground fronting the road to Lytton (now Wynnum Road) about 6 miles (9.7 km) beyond Kangaroo Point, was transferred early in 1868 from Joseph Berry to the Church Trustees (Bishop Edward Wyndham Tufnell and Tingalpa farmers Charles Coxen, John Mackenzie Shaw, Richard Warren Weedon and William Roach Wood). Importantly, the site was central to the small but scattered farming community of the Bulimba-Tingalpa district (which in 1868 encompassed Wynnum, Manly and Lota as well). The ground was cleared by voluntary labour and funds were raised through local and British subscription.

The church was free of debt almost immediately it was completed, and consequently was among the earliest Anglican churches in the Brisbane district to be consecrated, pre-dating All Saints on Wickham Terrace, St Mary's at Kangaroo Point, and possibly St Thomas' at South Brisbane (erected 1855), but post-dating the first St John's Church, consecrated in 1854. Guests at the Christ Church consecration ceremony of 27 October 1868, to which 400 persons were invited, included the newly appointed Governor of Queensland, Colonel Samuel Blackall; the President of the Legislative Council, Sir Maurice O'Connell; the Chief Justice of Queensland, James Cockle; and the Mayor of Brisbane, Alderman John Hardgrave.

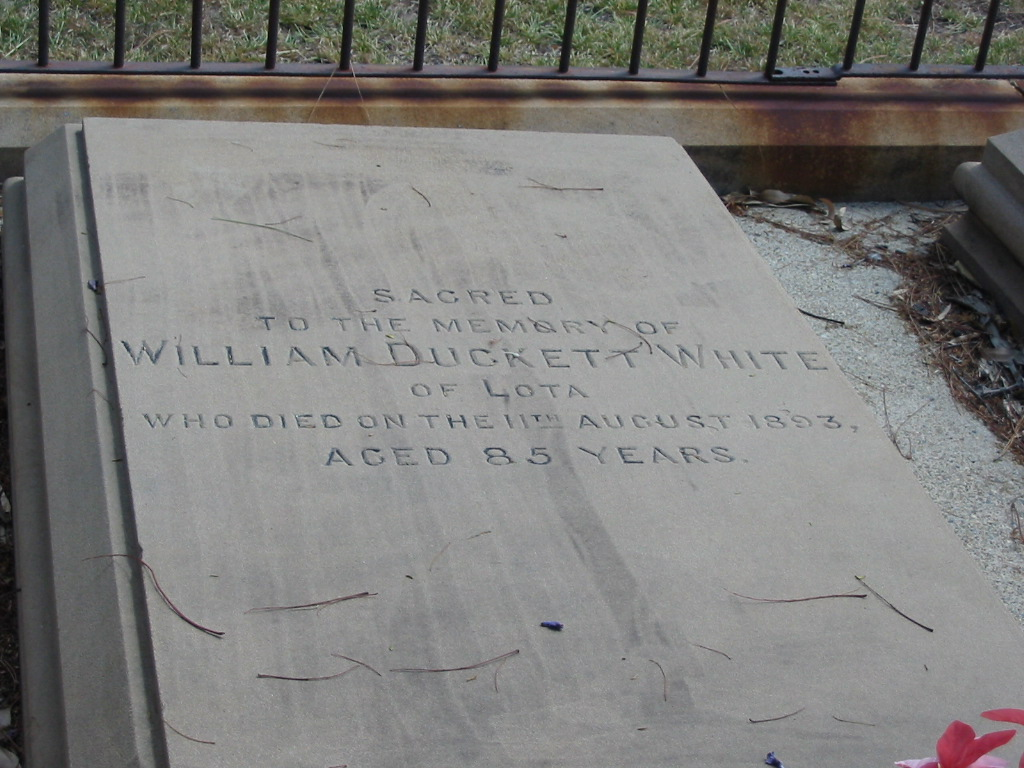
Gravestone for William Duckett White, Tingalpa cemetery, 2005

The first Christ Church Tingalpa was a picturesque building and a landmark on the road from Brisbane to the southern end of Moreton Bay. Substantial stables were constructed in the grounds, but no parsonage or church hall was erected. On the same allotment a small burial ground was established. The first recorded burial was that of Susannah Weedon of Cannon Hill, on 12 July 1868. This was prior to completion of the church, constructed April–August 1868. Later burials included the Hon. William Duckett White, Member of the Queensland Legislative Council, of Lota House and his family; Richard Thomas Jefferies (founder of the Queensland Musical Union - now the Queensland State and Municipal Choir - and of Palings Music Stores); and members of many of the early farming families of the Tingalpa-Wynnum district, including the Coxen family. The most recent interment was in 1993.

In 1873 the Church trustees acquired from Joseph Berry an additional one-acre block adjoining the eastern boundary of the original allotment. In late 1874 both parcels of land were transferred from the Church Trustees to the Corporation of the Synod of the Diocese of Brisbane.

Through the 1870s and 1880s Christ Church Tingalpa continued to serve a small, scattered rural community of approximately 50 square miles on the southeastern outskirts of Brisbane. In the early 1870s the principal cash crop in the district was sugar, but by the 1880s, changes in technology and the expansion of the sugar industry north of Brisbane had forced Tingalpa farmers into mixed farming and dairying, with some grape and wine production.

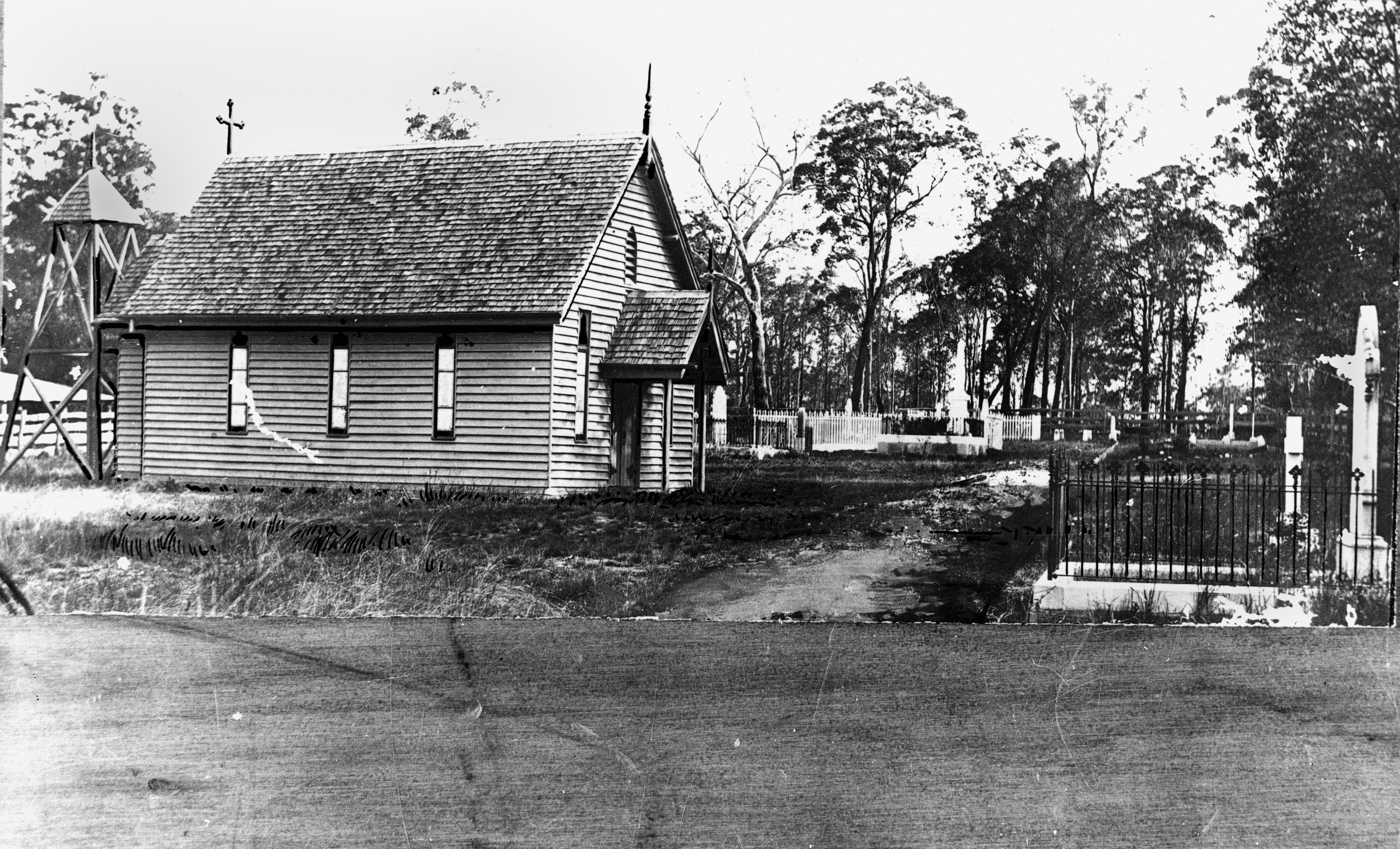
Church, 1906

Following the cyclone of 5 December 1885 which destroyed the 1868 Tingalpa church the local Anglican community, not prosperous but determined to rebuild, reconstructed their church using timbers salvaged from the original building. The second and present Christ Church Tingalpa was re-consecrated on 25 July 1886, smaller and less decorative than the first building, but still of weatherboard construction with a shingled roof. A concrete floor was laid this time, to give the building additional stability in strong winds. An early, undated photograph shows a detached, timber-framed bell tower with double cross-bracing and a pyramid-shaped shingled roof, to the east of the chancel. By the late 1880s Bulimba had become more densely settled and Wynnum-Lota-Manly boomed following the opening of the Cleveland railway line (via Wynnum) in November 1889. By the mid-1890s the Anglican parish of Tingalpa, still approximately 50 square miles, had a population of well over 6,000. St Peter's Anglican Church was erected at Wynnum in 1898. By 1899 the Bulimba church held 260 seats; St Peter's held 120; and Christ Church, with its 50 seats, was clearly no longer the focus of Tingalpa parish. In 1900 St John the Baptist Church was removed from the Tingalpa parish, and the Tingalpa rector concentrated his efforts on the booming Wynnum-Manly district.

In 1906 Rev. J. H. Whitehead was appointed rector of Tingalpa parish, and due to his enthusiastic parish work Christ Church was renovated in 1907 and acetylene gas lamps installed. However, Rev. Whitehead resigned in 1910 due to ill health, and during the 1910s Christ Church was neglected.

In 1923 St Peter's at Wynnum became a parish in its own right and Christ Church Tingalpa was declared to be extra-parochial and placed under the control and care of the Order of Witness. Founded by Bishop George Halford, who had resigned as Bishop of Rockhampton in 1920 to establish this work, the Order of Witness was a radical experiment within the Anglican church extension movement of the interwar period. Seeking to reach the men in the railway construction camps and mining camps, and the struggling families in the new soldier and immigrant settlements, Bishop Halford established an order of priests who lived very simply and were prepared to be sent anywhere a parish priest could not normally minister, living in the mining and construction camps, and bearing personal witness to their faith. To support their work, the Order obtained in 1922–1923 a small farm adjoining Christ Church Tingalpa. The farmhouse became their Priory, and the historic Tingalpa Church became their chapel.

The priory, grounds and chapel of the Order of Witness were blessed by the archbishop of the Brisbane Diocese on 22 February 1923. The Church Chronicle of 1 March 1923:53 reported: "The old Church has been restored and enriched by additional ornaments and furniture. A painted figure of out Lord on the Cross hangs from the roof and the Altar is backed by dorsals and flanked by riddels of blue material. The cross and candlesticks are of silver. The whole effect is beautiful and devotional, and shows how even a little plain wooden Church can be transformed into a thing of beauty and joy. Local parishioners were encouraged to attend the Chapel services, and a call was made for funds to restore the building and cemetery."

Early in 1927 Bishop Halford left the Diocese of Brisbane, where he had been working in the Eidsvold and Burnett River districts, to carry out similar missionary work in the Diocese of Rockhampton. It appears that the Tingalpa priory closed soon after and by September 1929 Christ Church Tingalpa, considered one of the historic churches of Queensland, was part of Morningside parish. Services in the Tingalpa church continued for some years, but the building once again fell into disrepair. By the mid-1930s the church was no longer attached to a parish, and demolition was proposed.

Once again the Tingalpa church was saved by an enthusiastic local priest. Rev. EJV Cavey, appointed to the Manly parochial district in 1938, took charge of Christ Church and organised a loan to renovate the building. The shingled roof was replaced with corrugated iron, the deteriorating concrete floor was replaced with hardwood, and the free-standing belfry was removed and replaced with a single cross-braced timber structure with a 4-gabled roof of corrugated iron, erected and dedicated to the memory of Miss Court, daughter of the first rector. The church was re-dedicated on 30 April 1939, and by November 1940 the debt had been cleared.

In the post-Second World War period much of the farming land in the Tingalpa district was subdivided for suburban and industrial purposes, and the population expanded rapidly through the 1950s and 1960s. In the 1950s Christ Church Tingalpa was painted and re-lined and in 1964 a church hall was erected on the land acquired in 1873. By 1968, the centenary of its establishment, the future for Christ Church looked promising.

However, with the decline in social relevance of established religions in the last quarter of the 20th century, has come yet another decline in the fortunes of Christ Church Tingalpa. In the early 1990s, the Anglican authorities once again called for its demolition. The belfry was removed in 1996, and all internal fittings, including a plaque erected to honour parishioners Stan Porter and his son Keith, who died in a Tingalpa plane crash in 1954, were removed. The church hall and the block of land acquired in 1873 have been sold.

It was subsequently saved and restored by The Friends of Tingalpa Cemetery Heritage Group Inc, and the building is now known as the "Pioneer Wedding Chapel".

== Description ==
Christ Church Tingalpa is a small, single-storeyed timber structure set well back from busy Wynnum Road at Tingalpa, on one acre of rising ground just east of the bridge over Bulimba Creek. The site fronts a major arterial road to the north, with light industrial development to the west, south and east. The church is aligned roughly east–west on the site, presenting a side wall to the street, but the entrance in the western facade is visible from the road on the approach from Brisbane city.

The building has a high pitched gabled roof clad with corrugated iron. The external walls which are clad with weatherboard sheeting, sit on a concrete base. The church has a simple rectangular plan, with a chancel alcove at the eastern end. To the south of the chancel is a small vestry, accessed both from the nave and from an external door in the western wall of the vestry. The chancel has a separate gabled roof, much lower than that of the nave but of the same pitch. The vestry at the southeast corner of the building also has a separate roof, the gable running at right angles to that of the chancel.

A small entrance portico is centrally located in the western facade of the building, and above this is a pointed arched vent with sloping timber louvres. There are large timber finials to the western end of the main gabled roof and to the gabled roof of the portico, and a timber cross at the eastern end of the main roof. The main entrance is a pointed arched double timber door which is flanked by three-paned patterned glass windows with timber trefoils. Three such windows are found on each of the two longer sides of the church, one in the eastern end of the chancel wall, and one in the southern wall of the vestry.

Internally, most of the walls and the ceilings are lined with fibrous cement sheeting, braced with timber strips. The chancel walls are clad with vertically jointed tongue and groove timber boards. A hardwood floor has been superimposed above the original concrete flooring. None of the church furniture, decorations and plaques remains.

The site contains a burial ground, with graves mostly to the west and south of the church, although the Coxen family grave is located in the area between the church and the street frontage to the north. All the graves are aligned to the east or southeast. The earliest headstone dates to 1868, the most recent to 1993, with burials in every decade in between. Some of the earlier graves retain their elegant wrought iron surrounds, and there are a number of substantial monuments and headstones illustrative of a variety of periods and styles. Unevenness of the ground in some parts is a fair indication that the site contains a number of unmarked graves as well.

The site is bordered by substantial trees, mostly Norfolk Island pines. At the front northeast corner of the allotment are two large fig trees which appear to flank the original entrance to the grounds.

== Heritage listing ==
Christ Church Tingalpa and Burial Ground was listed on the Queensland Heritage Register on 2 February 1998 having satisfied the following criteria.

The place is important in demonstrating the evolution or pattern of Queensland's history.

Christ Church Tingalpa and Burial Ground, established 1868 with the church re-constructed in 1886, is important in illustrating the pattern of development of Queensland history. In particular it illustrates the development of the Tingalpa-Wynnum district from the mid-19th century. The establishment of Christ Church Tingalpa is important in illustrating the determination of early immigrants to transplant to Queensland the culture and religion of their homeland. Historically, the place is significant as one of the earliest consecrated Anglican churches in Queensland.

The place demonstrates rare, uncommon or endangered aspects of Queensland's cultural heritage.

The burial ground is of particular importance. It is very early, pre-dating the establishment of general cemeteries such South Brisbane Cemetery at Dutton Park, Toowong Cemetery, Balmoral Cemetery, Hemmant Cemetery, Bald Hills Cemetery and Lutwyche Cemetery in the 1870s. It is rare as one of only a handful of Anglican church burial grounds surviving in Brisbane, with others located at Christ Church, Milton, St Matthews Anglican Cemetery, Sherwood and St Matthews Anglican Church, Grovely.

The place has potential to yield information that will contribute to an understanding of Queensland's history.

It is important for its potential to reveal information about the pattern of early settlement of Tingalpa and adjoining suburbs and of early social and living conditions.

The place is important in demonstrating the principal characteristics of a particular class of cultural places.

With headstones dating from 1868 to 1993, the burial ground contains monuments and headstones illustrative of a variety of periods and styles. It survives in reasonable order, and is a good example of a small church burial ground established in what was initially a rural district. Despite some white ant damage, the church remains a good example of its type - the simple, rectangular, pragmatic, ubiquitous Queensland weatherboard church - but appears to have retained some of the decorative elements of the first architect-designed building, including the timber trefoils to the windows, a trefoil arch in the portico, and the substantial pointed arched timber entrance doors.

The place is important because of its aesthetic significance.

The building retains a picturesque setting, with tall perimeter planting and some of the earlier graves retaining their elegant wrought iron surrounds, and the whole makes a substantial aesthetic contribution to the Tingalpa townscape.

The place has a strong or special association with a particular community or cultural group for social, cultural or spiritual reasons.

Both church and burial ground are of special significance to the local community, with several generations of Tingalpa and district families having worshipped and been buried there. It has been significant as a centre for Anglican worship, observance and education since 1868.

The place has a special association with the life or work of a particular person, group or organisation of importance in Queensland's history.

The place has a particular association with the work of the early settler families of the district, including the Weedon, Coxen, Stanton and White families, and is significant also for its association in the 1920s with the work of the experimental Order of Witness in Queensland.
