= George Thorn =

Australian politician

The Hon George Thorn
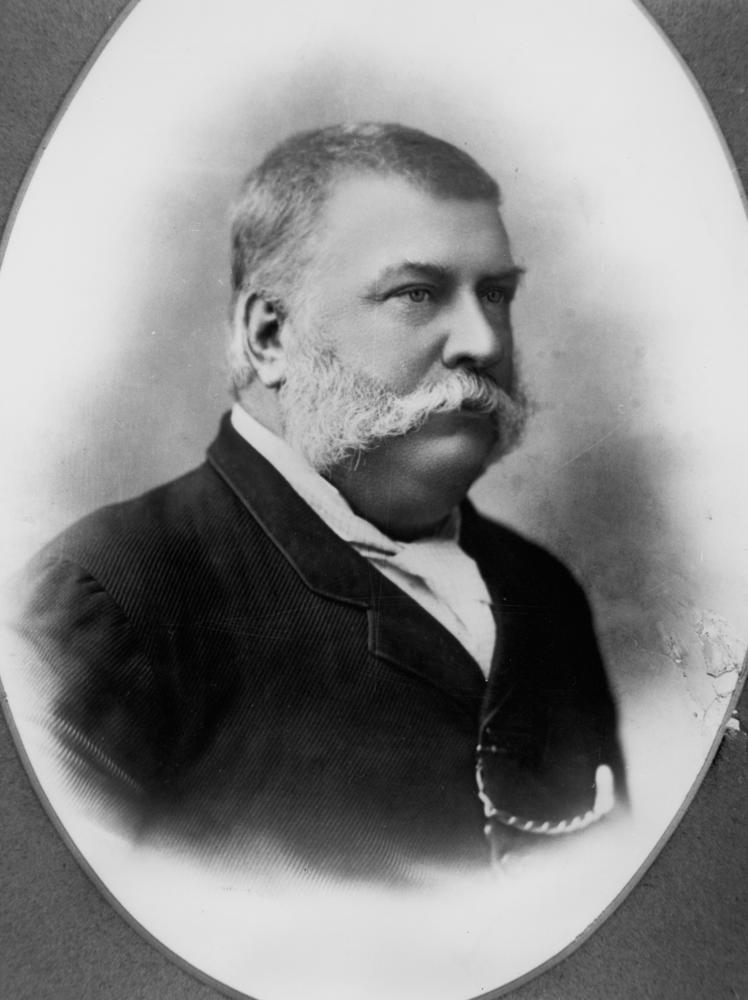

6th Premier of Queensland
- In office 5 June 1876 – 8 March 1877
- Preceded by: Arthur Macalister
- Succeeded by: John Douglas
- Constituency: Ipswich

Member of the Queensland Legislative Assembly for West Moreton
- In office 2 July 1867 – 18 November 1873 Serving with Patrick O'Sullivan, Samuel Hodgson, John Ferrett, Joshua Peter Bell, Frederick Forbes
- Preceded by: Joseph Fleming
- Succeeded by: Seat Abolished

Member of the Queensland Legislative Assembly for Fassifern
- In office 25 November 1873 – 9 January 1874
- Preceded by: New seat
- Succeeded by: John Thorn
- In office 4 August 1887 – 10 May 1888
- Preceded by: Alfred Midgley
- Succeeded by: William Salkeld
- In office 6 May 1893 – 11 March 1902
- Preceded by: William Salkeld
- Succeeded by: Thomas Murray-Prior

Member of the Queensland Legislative Council
- In office 9 January 1874 – 16 June 1876

Member of the Queensland Legislative Assembly for Ipswich
- In office 20 June 1876 – 18 February 1878
- Preceded by: Arthur Macalister
- Succeeded by: Seat abolished

Member of the Queensland Legislative Assembly for Northern Downs
- In office 17 April 1879 – 7 September 1883
- Preceded by: Joshua Peter Bell
- Succeeded by: Hugh Muir Nelson

Personal details
- Born: 12 October 1838 Sydney, Australia Australia
- Died: 15 January 1905 (aged 66) Ipswich, Queensland, Australia Australia
- Resting place: Ipswich General Cemetery
- Spouse: Celia Constance Maude Uniacke
- Relations: George Thorn Sr. (father), John Thorn (brother), Henry Thorn (brother), William Thorn (brother)
- Occupation: Grazier

George Henry Thorn (junior) (12 October 1838 – 15 January 1905) was a Member of the Queensland Legislative Assembly and a Premier of Queensland, Australia.

== Early life ==
George Thorn was born in Sydney, a son of George Thorn (senior) and his wife Jane (née Handcock). His father was one of the founders of the city of Ipswich and a founding Member of the Queensland Legislative Assembly representing the seat of West Moreton.

Thorn was schooled at The King's School, Parramatta. He attended the University of Sydney, and was one of the first residents of St Paul's College, University of Sydney and was awarded a Bachelor of Arts degree in 1858.

His sister Jane Thorn married George Harris, a Member of the Queensland Legislative Council in 1860. The couple lived for 27 years in the now heritage-listed Newstead House in Brisbane, where their parties were the highlight of Brisbane society.

== Political life ==
At the 1867 colonial election, Thorn followed in his father's footsteps by being elected a Member of the Queensland Legislative Assembly in the seat of West Moreton, which he held until the 1873 election.

Following that, he represented the seat of Fassifern from 25 November 1873 (the 1873 Queensland state election) until he resigned on 9 January 1874 to be appointed to the Queensland Legislative Council on 9 January 1874. His brother John Thorn won the resulting by-election in Fassifern on 24 January 1874.

During Thorn's time on the Legislative Council, he was the Government's representative in the council. He also held the role of Queensland Postmaster-General (9 January 1874 to 8 July 1876).

On 14 June 1876, Arthur Macalister, member for Ipswich, resigned. Although the Legislative Council was a lifetime appointment, Thorn resigned on 16 June 1876 to successfully contest the seat of Ipswich at a by-election on 20 June 1876.

Thorn became Premier of Queensland and Secretary for Public Works and Mines on 5 June 1876. However, he resigned from these roles on 8 March 1877, but remained in the ministry of his successor, John Douglas as Secretary for Public Works from 8 March 1877 to 7 November 1877 and then as Secretary for Public Lands and Mines from 7 November 1877 to 6 February 1878.

On 14 February 1878, Thorn married Celia Constance Maude Uniacke, daughter of Richard Uniacke of Melbourne, at "Ellengowan" on the Darling Downs.

Thorn resigned from the seat of Ipswich on 18 February 1878. John MacFarlane won the resulting by-election on 7 March 1878.

Thorn became Queensland commissioner to the 1878 Paris Exposition. On his return from Europe, on 17 April 1879 by another by-election, he successfully contested the seat of Northern Downs and held it until the 1883 election in September.

On 19 July 1887, Alfred Midgley, the member for Fassifern, resigned. Thorn won the resulting by-election on 4 August 1887. He held the seat until the 1888 election.

On 6 May 1893 (the 1893 Queensland state election), Thorn was elected again in Fassifern. He held the seat until 11 March 1902 when he was defeated in the 1902 election by Thomas de Montmorency Murray-Prior. He had no further involvement in politics after that.

== Later life ==
On 15 January 1905, George Thorn died from heart failure at his home at Booval, Queensland. He was buried in the Anglican section of Ipswich General Cemetery.

== Legacy ==
The gold mining town Thornborough was named after him.

== See also ==
- Members of the Queensland Legislative Assembly, 1863–1867; 1867–1868; 1868–1870; 1870–1871; 1871–1873; 1873–1878; 1878–1883; 1883–1888; 1893–1896; 1896–1899; 1899–1902
- Members of the Queensland Legislative Council, 1870–1879

Political offices
Preceded by Arthur Macalister	Premier of Queensland; 1876–1877	Succeeded by John Douglas
Parliament of Queensland
Preceded by Joseph Fleming	Member for West Moreton; 1867–1873; Served alongside: Patrick O'Sullivan, Samuel Hodgson, John Ferrett, Joshua Peter Bell, Frederick Forbes	Abolished
New seat	Member for Fassifern; 1873–1874	Succeeded by John Thorn
Preceded by Arthur Macalister	Member for Ipswich; 1876–1878	Abolished
Preceded by Joshua Peter Bell	Member for Northern Downs; 1879–1883	Succeeded by Hugh Muir Nelson
Preceded by Alfred Midgley	Member for Fassifern; 1887–1888	Succeeded by William Salkeld
Preceded by William Salkeld	Member for Fassifern; 1893–1902	Succeeded by Thomas Murray-Prior
