= Electoral district of Northern Downs =

Northern Downs Queensland—Legislative Assembly
- State: Queensland
- Created: 1859
- Abolished: 1887
- Namesake: Darling Downs

Northern Downs was a Legislative Assembly electorate in the state of Queensland, one of the original 16 created in 1859. It covered the Dalby and Condamine areas. In the electoral redistribution of 1887, Northern Downs was split into two new electoral districts, the Electoral district of Dalby and the Electoral district of Murilla.

== Members ==
The elected members for Northern Downs were:

Member	Party	Term
Charles Coxen		4 May 1860 – 1 July 1867
Henry Thorn		1 July 1867 – 28 September 1868
Joshua Peter Bell		28 September 1868 – 11 November 1873
Henry Thorn		11 November 1873 – 30 October 1876
William Miles		14 November 1876 – 21 November 1878 (by-election)
Joshua Peter Bell		21 November 1878 – 2 April 1879
George Thorn junior		17 April 1879 – 7 September 1883 (by-election)
Hugh Muir Nelson	Ministerialist	7 September 1883 – 28 April 1888

== See also ==
- Electoral districts of Queensland
- Members of the Queensland Legislative Assembly by year
- Category:Members of the Queensland Legislative Assembly by name
