= Thomas Lodge Murray-Prior =

Australian politician

The Honourable Thomas Murray-Prior
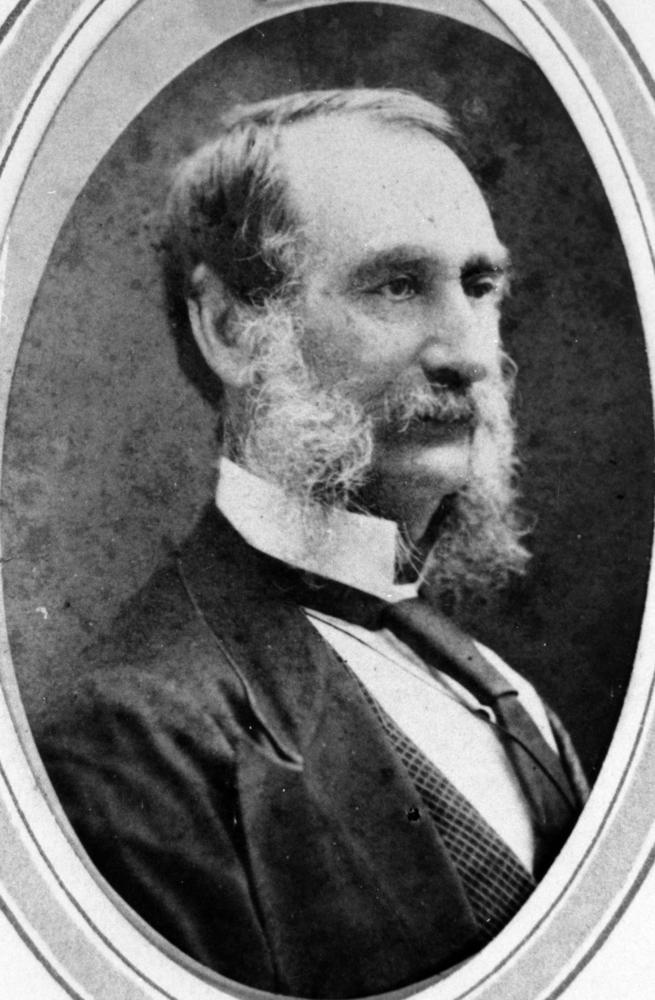
- Murray-Prior circa. 1865

Member of the Queensland Legislative Council
- In office 22 February 1866 – 31 December 1892

Personal details
- Born: Thomas Lodge Murray-Prior; 13 November 1819 Wells, Somerset, England
- Died: 31 December 1892 (aged 73) Brisbane, Queensland, Australia
- Resting place: Toowong Cemetery
- Spouse(s): Matilda Harpur (m.1846 d.1868), Nora Clarina Barton (m.1872 d.1931)
- Relations: Rosa Praed (daughter), Thomas Murray-Prior (son)
- Occupation: Farmer, Grazier, Public servant

Thomas Lodge Murray-Prior (13 November 1819 – 31 December 1892) was a pastoralist and politician in the colony of Queensland, now a state of Australia. He held the office of Postmaster-General in Queensland, Australia, whilst Member of the Queensland Legislative Council.

== Early life ==
Thomas Lodge Murray-Prior was born on 13 November 1819 at Wells, Somerset, England, the son of Thomas Murray-Prior of Windsor Terrace and his second wife Eliza Catherine Skinner. His father was born in 1790 and was an officer in the 11th Hussars and served at the Battle of Waterloo. His parents married at Cookham Church, Berkshire, on 31 December 1818. His father died in Southsea on 19 July 1864. His mother died on 18 November 1863. His paternal grandparents were Thomas Murray-Prior of Rathdowney, Ireland, and Catherine Palmer. His maternal grandparents were William Augustus Skinner of Moor Hall, Cookham, and Mary Orlebar.

Murray-Prior was educated by the private tutors Monsieur Giron at Reading, and Dr. Burney at Gosport and in Brussels under Reverend William Drury.

== Farming in Queensland ==
Murray-Prior took up sheep farming on a large scale; during one scab outbreak in 1858 he lost 8,000 sheep; during that same year he sold his sheep farm and bought a banana plantation at Ormiston, Queensland.

== Postmaster-General ==
In 1860 Murray-Prior tried but failed to be elected to the seat of East Moreton, and in 1861 became a Postal Inspector – he became Postmaster-General in 1862. When this position became a political post, he was nominated to the Queensland Legislative Council on 10 April 1866. In 1863 Rachel Henning wrote: "I suppose it does not require any great talent to be a Postmaster General. I hope not, for such a goose I have seldom seen. He talked incessantly and all his conversation consisted of pointless stories of which he himself was the hero."

== Marriages and issue ==
On 3 September 1846 in Liverpool Murray-Prior married Matilda Harpur, daughter of the immigrant Thomas Harpur of Belfast. One of the sons from the marriage was Thomas de Montmorency Murray-Prior (a Member of the Queensland Legislative Assembly).

After Matilda's death in 1868 at age 41, he married a second time in Ryde, New South Wales, on 18 December 1872 to Nora Clarina Barton (Boree Nyrang near Orange, New South Wales, 3 December 1846 – London, 1931), who was an aunt of Poet Andrew Barton (Banjo) Paterson (son of Andrew Bogle Paterson and Rose Isabella Barton) and cousin of Sir John Darvall, daughter of Robert Johnstone Barton (1811 – Cudal, New South Wales, 1863) and wife (married Sydney, 1840 or 1841) Emily Mary Darvall (born 1818), paternal granddaughter of Charles Barton and Susannah Johnston and maternal granddaughter of Edward Darvall and Emily Godschall Johnson.

He was survived by seven of the twelve children of his first marriage and seven of the eight children from his second. His eldest daughter, Rosa Praed, was a noted author.

== Descendancy to the Queen of the Albanians ==
His son Robert Sterling Murray-Prior (Kangaroo Point, 29 September 1881 – Hunters Hill, 31 May 1962) married Estella Augusta Herring (Gladesville, 3 March 1883 – Hunters Hill, 7 September 1968) at Gladesville on 22 April 1906, daughter of Gerard Edgar Herring (Cromer, Norfolk, 1835 – Gladesville, Sydney, 10 February 1915), Under Secretary for Lands, and second wife (married Ryde, New South Wales, 1879) Caroline Estella De Lange.

His granddaughter Phyllis Dorothea Murray-Prior (born 14 December 1913, Hunters Hill) married at Hunters Hill on 23 February 1935 Alan Robert Cullen-Ward (Mosman, born 23 August 1910), son of Rupert Allen Cullen-Ward (Stoke Newington, 18 June 1881 – Sydney, 12 June 1948) and wife (married Drummoyne, 1 December 1909) Mary Winifred Collins (Charter's Towers, 4 May 1884 – Drummoyne, 13 May 1940), paternal grandson of William Cullen-Ward (Paddington, 25 April 1854 – Waverley, New South Wales, 5 September 1913) and Mary Ann Hibbard, maternal grandson of Robert Collins (Liverpool, born 8 September 1844) and Winifred Geraghty (Ballinasloe, born 1851), and great-grandson of William Ward and Elizabeth Ann Cullen.

His great-granddaughter, Susan Barbara Cullen-Ward, married Crown Prince Leka of Albania, only son of King Zog I of Albania.

== Death ==
Murray-Prior died at Whytecliffe, Nundah, Queensland, on 31 December 1892 and was buried in Toowong Cemetery.

== Arms ==
Coat of arms of Thomas Lodge Murray-Prior

Notes
Granted on 25 October 1888 by Sir John Bernard Burke, Ulster King of Arms.
Crest
1st an estoile Vert (Prior) 2nd a mullet per pale Or and Gules.
Escutcheon
Quarterly 1st & 4th Vert on a bend ermine three chevronels Gules (Prior) 2nd & 3rd per fess Gules and Or four mullets counterchanged (Murray).
Motto
Malo Mori Quam Foedari
