= Electoral district of Fassifern =

Former state electoral district of Queensland, Australia

Coordinates: 27.9604°S 152.5794°E

Fassifern Queensland—Legislative Assembly
- State: Queensland
- Created: 1873
- Abolished: 1992
- Namesake: Fassifern Valley

Fassifern was an electoral district of the Legislative Assembly in the Australian state of Queensland from 1873 to 1992.

It was based on the area south of Ipswich and stretched toward the New South Wales border, although in subsequent redistributions was reduced in size away from the growing Brisbane area. It was named after the Fassifern Valley.

Fassifern was a safe Country/National district for most of its existence. It was abolished in the 1991 redistribution under the Goss government, and was largely replaced by the new district of Beaudesert.

== Members for Fassifern ==
Member	Party	Term
George Thorn		1873–1874
John Thorn		1874–1878
de Burgh Fitzpatrick Persse		1878–1883
Alfred Midgley		1883–1887
George Thorn		1887–1888
William Salkeld		1888–1893
George Thorn		1893–1902
Thomas Murray-Prior	Opposition	1902
Charles Moffatt Jenkinson	Opposition	1903–1909
Arnold Wienholt	Liberal	1909–1913
Ernest Bell	Liberal	1913–1918
Ernest Bell	National	1918–1920
Ernest Bell	Country	1920–1922
Ernest Bell	United	1922–1925
Ernest Bell	CPNP	1925–1930
Arnold Wienholt	Independent	1930–1935
Alf Muller	CPNP	1935–1936
Alf Muller	Country	1936–1961
Alf Muller	Independent	1961–1965
Alf Muller	Country	1965–1969
Selwyn Muller	Country	1969–1974
Selwyn Muller	National	1974–1983
Kev Lingard	National	1983–1992

== See also ==
- Electoral districts of Queensland
- Members of the Queensland Legislative Assembly by year
- Category:Members of the Queensland Legislative Assembly by name
- Political families of Australia
