= Charles Coxen =

Australian politician

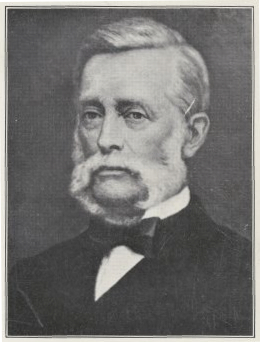
- Photo of portrait at the Queensland Museum

Member of the Queensland Legislative Assembly for Northern Downs
- In office 4 May 1860 – 1 July 1867
- Preceded by: New seat
- Succeeded by: Henry Thorn

Personal details
- Born: Charles Coxen; 20 April 1809 Ramsgate, Kent, England
- Died: 17 May 1876 (aged 67) Brisbane, Queensland, Australia
- Resting place: Tingalpa Christ Church (Anglican) cemetery, Brisbane
- Spouse: Elizabeth Frances Isaac
- Relations: John Gould (brother-in-law)
- Occupation: Grazier, Museum administrator, Ornithologist

Charles Coxen (20 April 1809 – 17 May 1876) was a naturalist and politician in Queensland, Australia. He was a Member of the Queensland Legislative Assembly. He was a brother-in-law of John Gould who had married his sister Elizabeth.

== Early life ==
Coxen was born in Ramsgate, Kent, England. He emigrated to New South Wales, Australia, in 1834, to join his elder brother Stephen who had emigrated there seven years previously. During 1834–1835 he travelled through the sparsely settled country between the Hunter and Namoi Rivers, including the Liverpool Plains, collecting specimens of birds and mammals.

After gaining experience in pastoral management at his brother's property “Yarrundi” near Scone, Coxen was involved in the management of several properties, first in northern New South Wales and later as one of the early settlers of the Darling Downs region of southern Queensland, along with his nephew Henry Coxen. In 1851 he married Elizabeth Frances Isaac, a woman who, unusually for the times, became known for her studies in meteorology and conchology. In 1862 he helped establish the Queensland Museum in Brisbane, became its first honorary curator and secretary, as well as being a trustee, in association with the explorer Sir Augustus Gregory. He was also a founder of the Queensland Philosophical Society in 1859, the predecessor of the Royal Society of Queensland. His wife Elizabeth became the first woman member of the Royal Society of Queensland.

From 1855 to 1860 Coxen served as a member of a standing jury appointed to try civil cases in Brisbane.

== Politics ==
At the 1860 colonial election, Coxen was elected the representative of the Northern Downs to Queensland's first parliament. He held that seat until 1867 election, where he was defeated by Henry Thorn. During that period, he was the Chairman of Committees from 28 July 1863 to 29 May 1867.

== Later life ==
After losing his parliamentary seat in 1867, he visited the new Gympie goldfield. In 1868 he was appointed land commissioner for Moreton Bay; in 1870 he also became land agent for Brisbane and, in 1872, inspecting commissioner for the settled districts, holding the three positions until 1875. In 1874 he was appointed to a commission inquiring into conditions of Aboriginals in Queensland.

Coxen died at Bulimba in Brisbane and was buried in Tingalpa Christ Church (Anglican) cemetery. He is commemorated in the name of Coxen's Fig Parrot (Cyclopsitta diophthalma coxeni), named by his brother-in-law and by Coxen Street, Zillmere, a northern suburb of Brisbane.

There is also Charles Coxen Close, Oxley Vale, a suburb of Tamworth in northern New South Wales.

Parliament of Queensland
New seat	Member for Northern Downs; 1860–1867	Succeeded by Henry Thorn
