= John Thorn (politician) =

Australian politician (1847–1896)

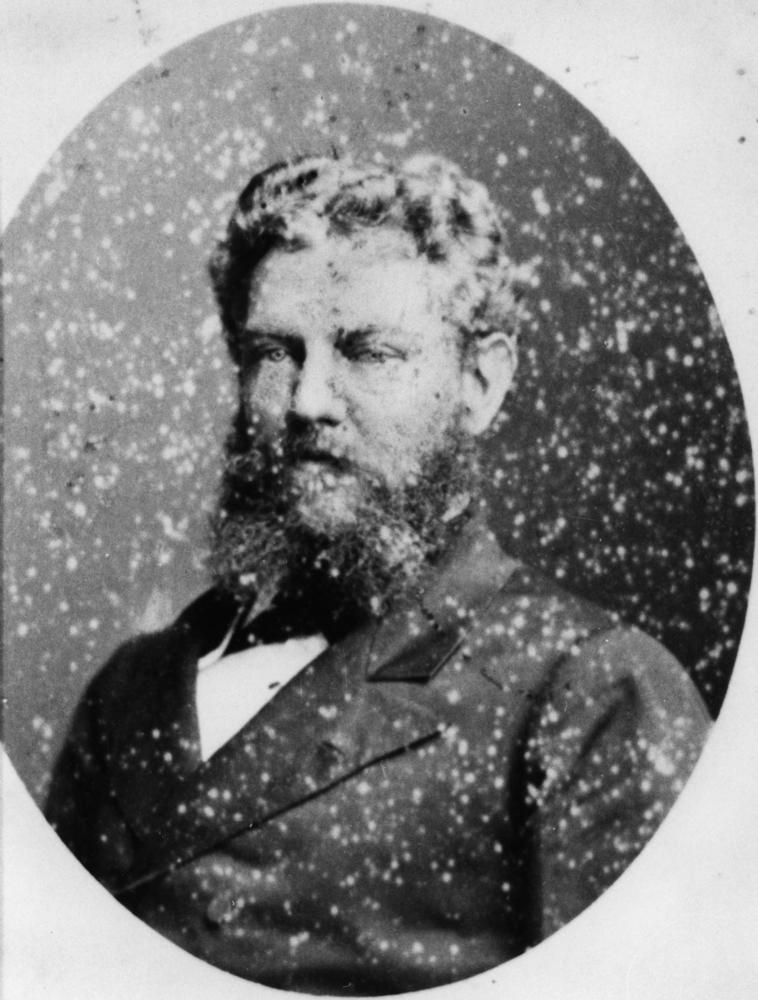

Member of the Queensland Legislative Assembly for Fassifern
- In office 24 January 1874 – 12 March 1878
- Preceded by: George Thorn
- Succeeded by: de Burgh Fitzpatrick

Personal details
- Born: 12 December 1847 Ipswich, Queensland
- Died: 30 April 1896 (aged 48) Brisbane, Queensland
- Resting place: Toowong Cemetery
- Spouse: Frances Augusta March
- Relations: George Thorn, Sr. (father), George Thorn, Jr. (brother), Henry Thorn (brother)
- Occupation: Station manager, Railway contractor

John Thorn (12 December 1847 – 30 April 1896) was a politician in Queensland, Australia. He was a Member of the Queensland Legislative Assembly.

== Early life ==
John Thorn was born on 12 December 1847 at Ipswich, Queensland, the son of George Thorn (senior), a Member of the Queensland Legislative Assembly, and his wife Jane (née Handcock). He was educated at Ipswich Grammar School.

He married Frances Augusta March, on 3 February 1875 in Sydney. The couple had 5 sons and 2 daughters.

== Politics ==
His brother George Thorn had represented the seat of Fassifern in the Queensland Legislative Assembly until he resigned on 9 January 1874 to be appointed to the Queensland Legislative Council on that day. John Thorn won the resulting by-election in Fassifern on 24 January 1874.

He held the seat until he resigned on 12 March 1878. His resignation was due to his being a partner in the firm Annear & Co, who had been the successful tenderers for a contract to build the railway line from Gympie to Maryborough. de Burgh Fitzpatrick Persse won the resulting by-election on 9 April 1878.

== Later life ==
John Thorn died on 30 April 1896 at Brisbane and was buried in Toowong Cemetery.

== See also ==
- Members of the Queensland Legislative Assembly, 1873–1878

Parliament of Queensland
Preceded by George Thorn	Member for Fassifern; 1874–1878	Succeeded by de Burgh Fitzpatrick
