= Thomas de Montmorency Murray-Prior =

Australian politician

Thomas Murray-Prior
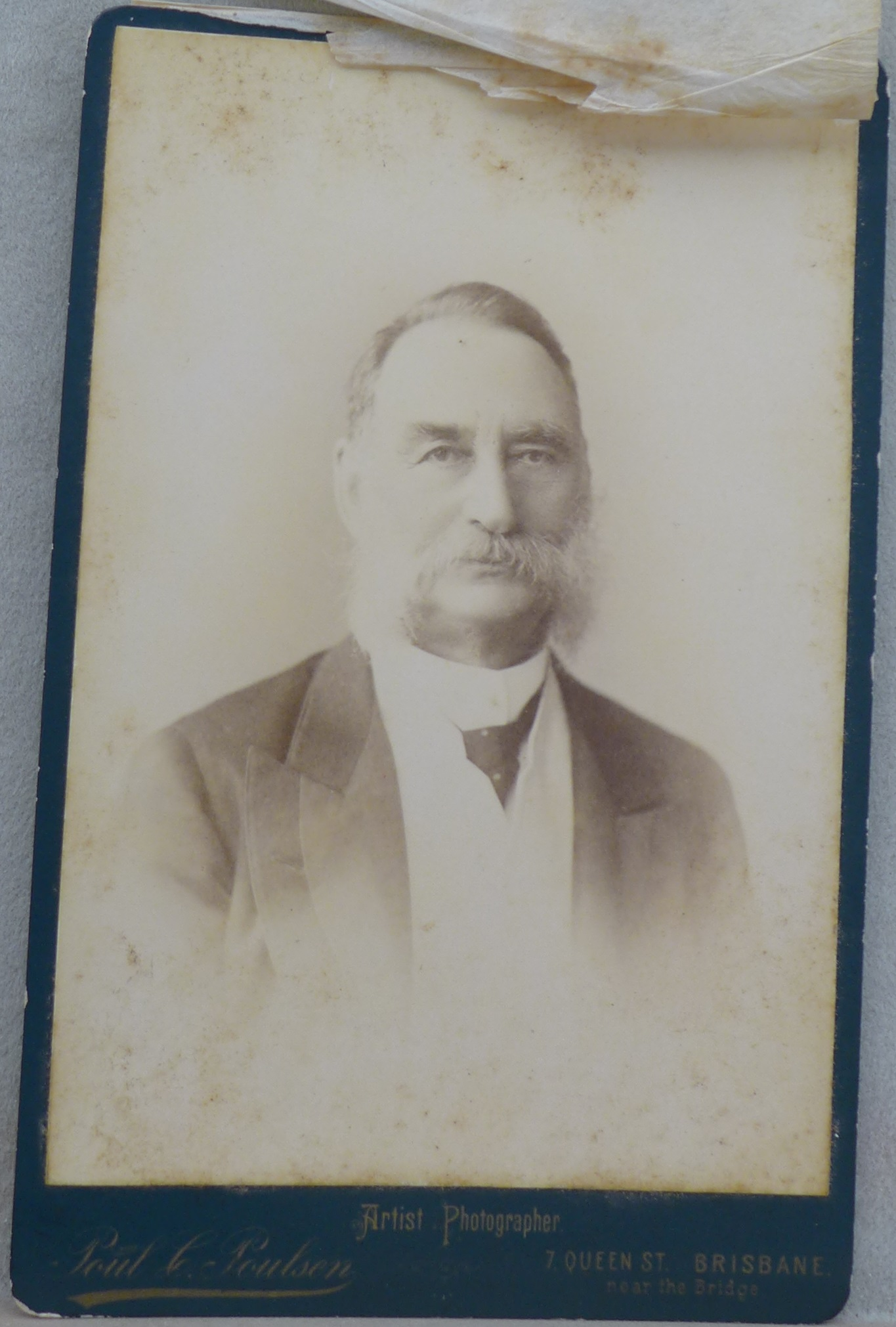

Member of the Queensland Legislative Assembly for Fassifern
- In office 11 March 1902 – 11 December 1902
- Preceded by: George Thorn
- Succeeded by: Charles Moffatt Jenkinson

Personal details
- Born: Thomas de Montmorency Murray-Prior; 27 January 1848 Bromelton, Colony of New South Wales
- Died: 11 December 1902 (aged 54) Maroon, Queensland
- Spouse: Florence Claudia Moor (m. 1878)
- Relations: Rosa Praed (sister)
- Parent: Thomas Lodge Murray-Prior (father)
- Occupation: Grazier, Goldminer

Thomas de Montmorency Murray-Prior (27 January 1848 – 11 December 1902) was a politician in Queensland, Australia. He was a Member of the Queensland Legislative Assembly.

== Early life ==
He was born in Bromelton to politician Thomas Lodge Murray-Prior and Matilda Harpur. He attended school in Brisbane and Hobart, working as a pastoralist at Maroon before becoming a miner in the Palmer goldfield.

He married Florence Claudia Moor on 18 March 1878 at Bowen. He inherited Maroon Station on his father's death in 1892, and also became vice-president of the Queensland Chamber of Agriculture.

== Politics ==
He was elected to the Queensland Legislative Assembly as the member for Fassifern in March 1902, but he died in Brisbane in December of that year.

== Later life ==
He died on 11 December 1902 at Maroon following a long internal illness; his death was not unexpected.

Parliament of Queensland
Preceded by George Thorn	Member for Fassifern; 1902	Succeeded by Charles Moffatt Jenkinson
