= Alfred Midgley =

Australian politician

Member of the Queensland Legislative Assembly
- In office 7 September 1883 – 20 July 1887
- Constituency: Fassifern

Personal details
- Born: February 24, 1849 Leeds, Yorkshire, England
- Died: February 5, 1930 (aged 80) Corinda, Brisbane, Queensland, Australia
- Occupation: Politician, minister, poet, merchant

Alfred Midgley (24 February 1849 – 5 February 1930) was an Australian politician in Queensland. He was a Member of the Queensland Legislative Assembly. He represented the seat of Fassifern from 7 September 1883 to 20 July 1887.

== Early life and career ==
Alfred Midgley was born on 24 February 1849 in Leeds, Yorkshire, England, the son of Mary (née Hannah) and an unknown father.

He was an apprentice engineer in Leed. In 1865, he converted and became a local preacher. In 1870, he immigrated to Brisbane on the Storm King. From 1870 to 1873 he worked as an engineer in Rockhampton. He served as a Methodist minister in Ipswich from 1871 to 1873, in Toowoomba from 1873 to 1876 and in Albert Street, Brisbane from 1876 to 1878. From 1879 he was a produce merchant in Brisbane but that business failed in 1887. He was also a poet.

Midgley married on 6 October 1886 to Sarah Ellen Baron with whom he had 2 sons and 4 daughters. On 3 February 1875 he married Sarah Elizabeth Vowles with whom he had 2 sons and 2 daughters. He was a Wesleyan Methodist.

Midgley died on 5 February 1930 in Corinda, Brisbane.
