= 1867 Queensland colonial election =

Legislative Assembly election in Australia

Elections were held in the Australian state of Queensland between 18 June 1867 and 19 July 1867 to elect the members of the state's Legislative Assembly.

== Key dates ==
Due to problems of distance and communications, it was not possible to hold the elections on a single day.

== See also ==
- Members of the Queensland Legislative Assembly, 1867–1868
