= Mary May =

Mary May may refer to:

- Mary May, character in Andre (film)
- David and Mary May House, Ohio, USA
- Mary May Roberts (1877–1959), American nurse and editor
- Mary May Scollen (1887–1967), Australian Roman Catholic nun, nurse, and hospital administrator
- Mary Simon, née Mary May, (born 1947), Canadian civil servant, diplomat, and former broadcaster
- Marta May (born 1939), Spanish actress
