= Mater Hospital, North Sydney =

Private hospital in Sydney, Australia

The Mater Hospital is a 233-bed private hospital located in North Sydney, New South Wales, Australia. Originally founded in 1906 as a cottage hospital, and operated both as a public hospital and maternity hospital on an adjacent site in Wollstonecraft, New South Wales, between 1940 and 1982, the current hospital opened in 1990 and is now operated by St Vincent's Health.

== History ==
The hospital was established by the Sisters of Mercy in 1906 as the Mater Misericordiae Hospital for Women and Children with 12 beds and 12 cots on a site in Willoughby Road. In 1910, the sisters purchased and renovated ‘Wenona’, a large residence of a local bank manager on Lane Cove Road (now Pacific Highway), and by 1911 it functioned as a fully operational hospital.

A public Hospital, known as the "Mater General Hospital," was then erected and opened in 1914, adjacent to ‘Wenona," whereupon the cottage hospital was closed, and ‘Wenona’ then became the Mater Private Hospital. A major extension to the Mater Private Hospital was built on Sinclair Street Wollstonecraft in 1929.

An adjacent Mater Maternity Hospital was built between 1939 and 1942 and an obstetrics training school was established. In 1942-1943, its first full year of operation, 1242 babies were delivered and 1318 mothers were treated.

In cooperation with Our Lady of Mercy Home at Waitara, unwed or destitute women were sent to the Mater to provide care before and after the birth of their babies, and from here, adoption also occurred.

With increased government funding, the Mater became a public institution in 1946 and, in 1968, a teaching hospital, linked to the University of Sydney. Also in 1968, the first renal unit on the North Shore was established. By 1982, the buildings required renovation, but the government, wanting to respond to the needs of the western suburbs of Sydney, refused funding, and so the Public Hospital and Maternity Hospital were closed. Responsibility for storing the medical records of the original Mater Hospital rests with the Royal North Shore Hospital, St Leonards.

The Art Deco Maternity Hospital building remains a local heritage item, the Former Mater Misericordiae Maternity Hospital for its architecture and as an early attempt to detach maternity facilities from the general hospital. The Queen Anne Federation style Resident Medical Officer's residence is also heritage listed.

A new (and the current) private hospital was built and reopened (as the Mater Hospital) on an adjacent site in Rocklands Road, North Sydney in 1990. In January 2001, the Mater Hospital was incorporated into a new entity, St Vincents & Mater Health Sydney Limited; together with St Vincent’s Public Hospital, Sacred Heart Hospice, and St Vincent’s Private Hospital.

== Notable people ==
- Sister Justinian, born Mary May Scollen, was the matron at Mater from 1919 until 1963. She served for four years as the hospital administrator, from 1963 to 1967. She was appointed O.B.E. for her contributions in nursing.

== Bibliography ==
- Carey, Hilary (1991). In the best of hands : a history of the Mater Misericordiae Public Hospital & the Mater Misericordiae Private Hospital, North Sydney, 1906-91. Sydney: Hale & Iremonger. ISBN 0868064610.
