= Aberfoyle, Warwick =

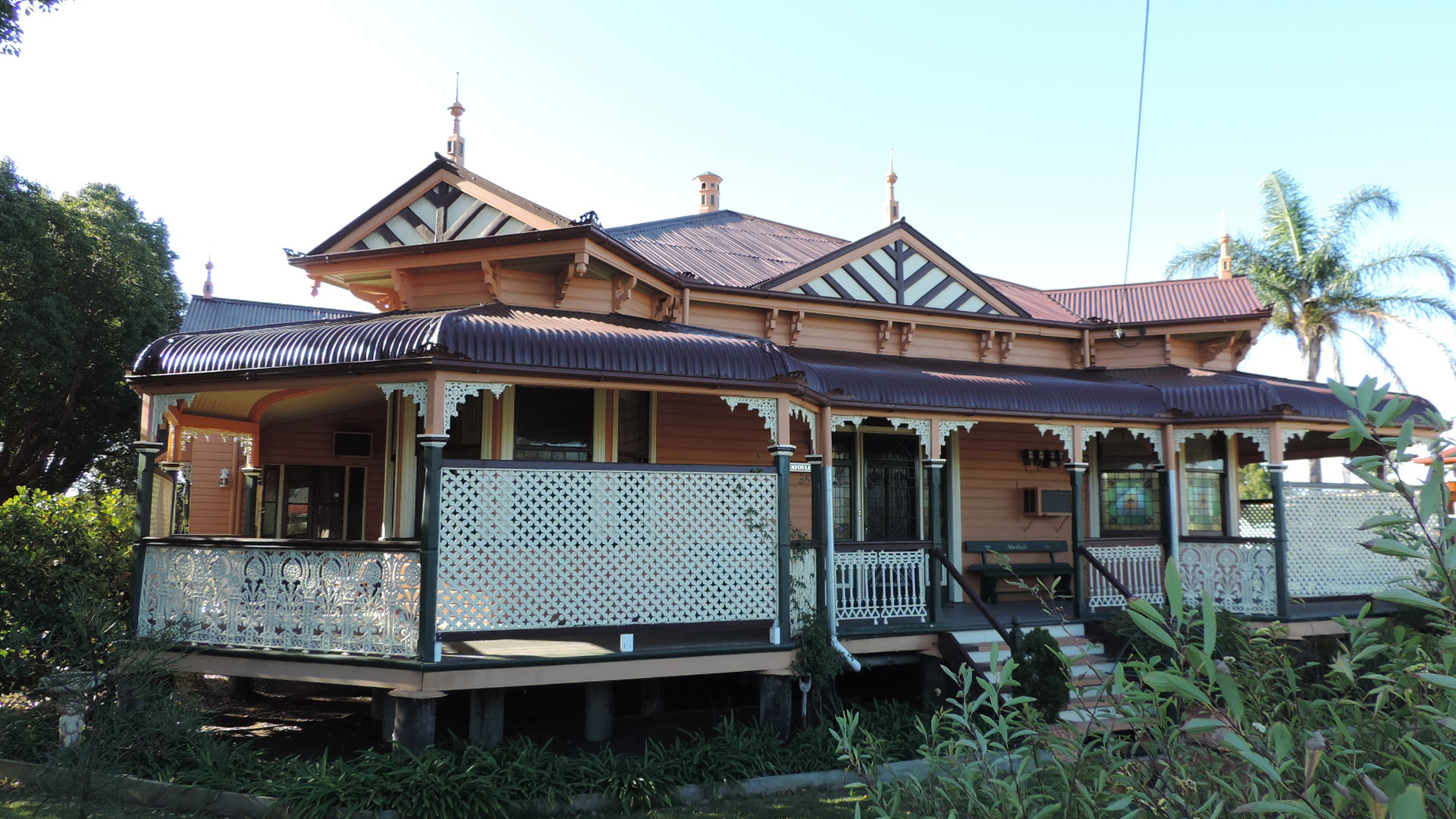
- Aberfoyle, 2015

- Location within Queensland Location within Australia
- 28.2204°S 152.0346°E
- Location: 35 Wood Street, Warwick, Southern Downs Region, Queensland, Australia

History
- Design period: 1900–1914 (early 20th century)
- Built: 1910–c. 1927
- Built for: Peter Alexander Affleck

Site notes
- Architect: Hugh Hamilton Campbell
- Architectural styles: Federation Filigree, Queenslander

Queensland Heritage Register
- Official name: Aberfoyle
- Type: state heritage (landscape, built)
- Designated: 5 August 1996
- Reference no.: 601772
- Significant period: 1910s–1920s (historical, fabric)
- Significant components: residential accommodation – main house, lead light/s, trees/plantings, kitchen/kitchen house, pathway/walkway
- Builders: Ludwig August Tessman

Aberfoyle is a heritage-listed detached house at 35 Wood Street, Warwick, Southern Downs Region, Queensland, Australia. It was designed by architect Hugh Hamilton Campbell and built from 1910 to c. 1927. It was added to the Queensland Heritage Register on 5 August 1996. It is also listed on the Southern Downs Local Heritage Register.

== History ==
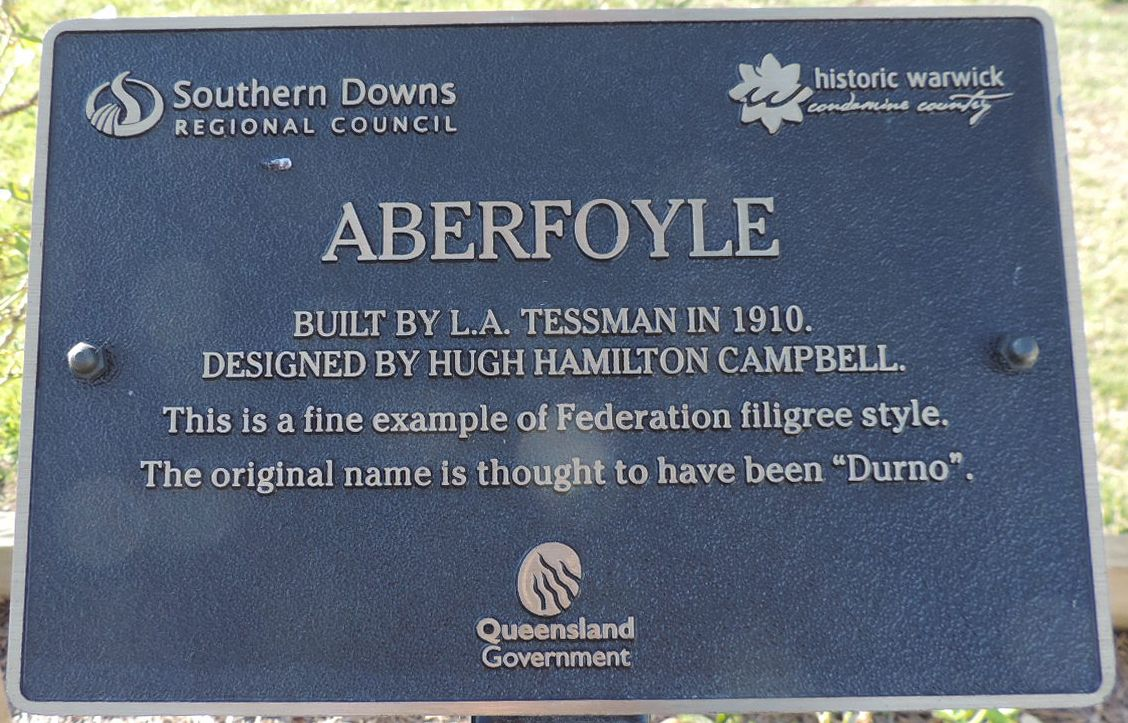
Plaque, 2015

Aberfoyle, a residence in Wood Street, Warwick was constructed in 1910 to the design of local architect, Hugh Hamilton Campbell for local dentist Peter Alexander Affleck.

Warwick was established as an administrative centre of the emerging Darling Downs regions in 1847, with a post office being established in the town in 1848. This year saw the first survey work of the embryonic town completed by surveyor, James Charles Burnett, with further surveys in 1850, and the first sale of crown land in July 1850. On 25 May 1861 Warwick was granted the status of a municipality (the Borough of Warwick). Throughout the 1860s and with the introduction of a rail link to Toowoomba in 1871 Warwick was consolidated as a small municipal centre.

Warwick continued to grow as the service centre of the southern Darling Downs and by the 1910s consolidation of the town occurred with many substantial commercial, religious and residential buildings constructed. Barnes & Co, a local trading company, built a large department store in Palmerin Street; the local Roman Catholic community thought that a larger church was required to accommodate the growing population though this was not built until the late 1920s; full scale redevelopment of the Warwick railway station was undertaken and the commercial core of Warwick was consolidated.

Aberfoyle was built in 1910 on land to the south east of the core of the town near Slade Park. The area near this land was developing as a result of the subdivision of the Cornwall Estate into building allotments giving impetus there for closer settlement. Contemporary newspaper reports describe the area in which Aberfoyle was built as this portion of town where such a large amount of building progress has been recently made.

According to the titles information on the property, the land on which Aberfoyle was built was first acquired by Deed of Grant by Matilda Blewett on 26 April 1859. The titles suggest that Peter Affleck (Snr), a member of a prominent local saw-milling family acquired the property in November 1882. Affleck died in June 1886 leaving the property to his widow Anne Affleck. Peter Alexander Affleck, the son of the Anne and Peter snr, acquired the property on 19 August 1910. Peter Alexander was trained as a dentist and ran a dental practice from his surgery in Palmerin Street. Until 1910 a Miss Jessie L Affleck, presumably a relative of Mr Peter Affleck, is listed in the Queensland Post Office Directories as living at Freestone Creek. From 1911 she and Peter Affleck are listed as living in Wood Street, presumably in Aberfoyle.

The house was constructed for £948 by contractor, Ludwig August Tessman to the design of local architect, Hugh Hamilton Campbell. Campbell had been working in Warwick, variously as a cabinet maker and contractor, before practicing as an architect from about 1897, in which business his son, Roderick Hamilton Campbell, joined him as partner in about 1909. Campbell snr designed a cottage, Westhall, for a Mrs P Affleck in Freestone Creek, the mother of Peter Alexander and this may be the house in which Jessie L is listed as living until her move to Aberfoyle.

When construction was finished the two local newspapers wrote lengthy descriptions of the house. Aberfoyle was constructed as a six roomed timber residence with a central hallway from the main entrance off Wood Street. The hallway was divided by a glass door separating the entrance from the rear portion, off which access was given to a bathroom housing a sunken bath. The floor of the bathroom was covered with lead and the walls were clad to dado height with small gauge corrugated iron sheets. The painting was completed by local painter, Mr Donald Crawford and the plumbing by Mr E Morrison.

Aberfoyle was transferred to a William Tindal Scrymgeour in January 1927 and he lived there until his death in December 1929. The house was known as Aberfoyle throughout his occupation. Subsequently, the house changed hands many times during the century. A breakfast room was added to the northern end of Aberfoyle between 1918 and 1927. Other additions were made after this. Conservation work has been an ongoing concern of the present owners who bought Aberfoyle in 1993; frieze stencils have been uncovered and repainted, joinery has been wood grained and restorative work has been done to the entrance pathway from Wood Street.

== Description ==
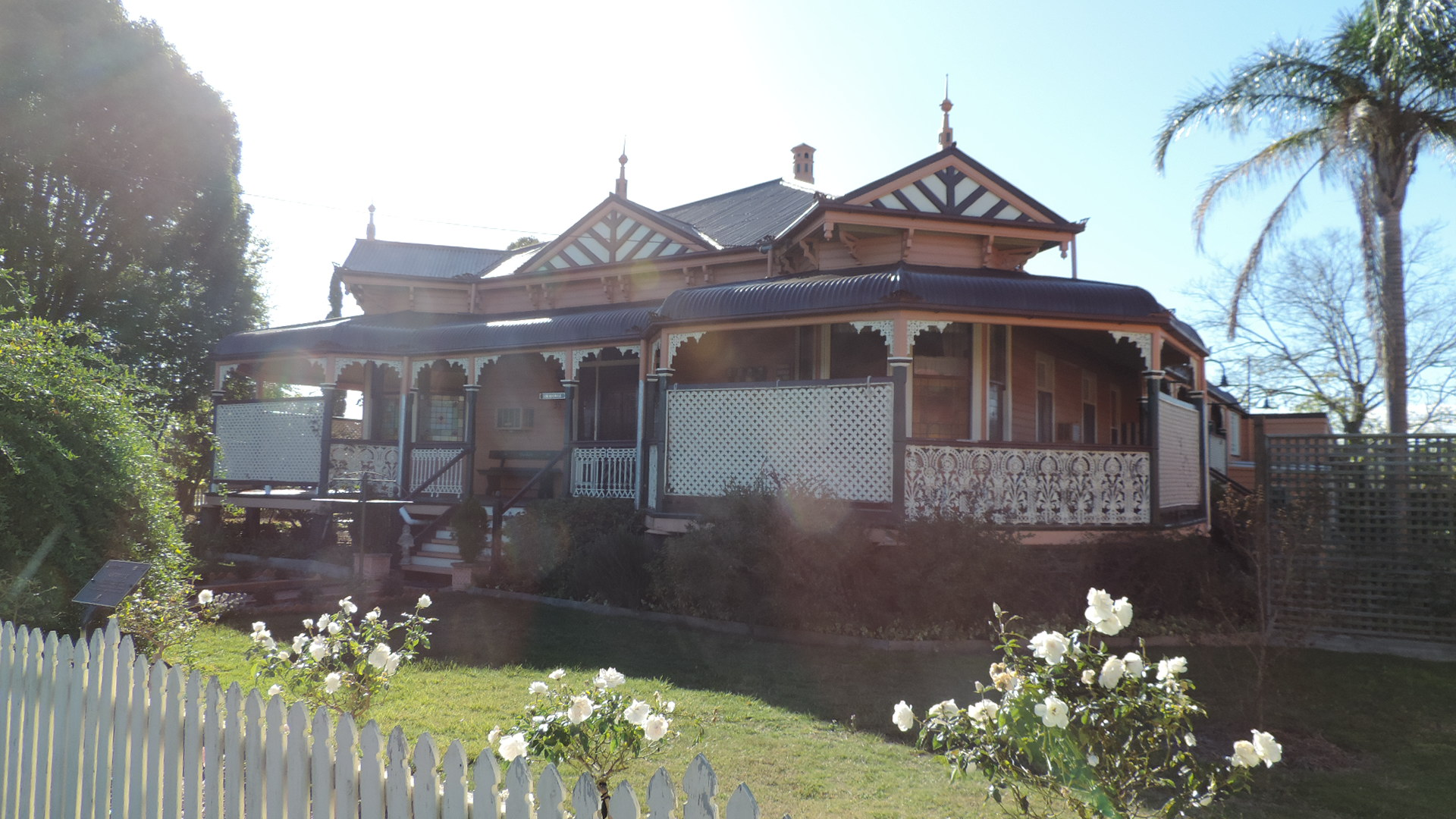
Aberfoyle, 2015

Aberfoyle is a single-storeyed chamferboard residence with a corrugated iron hipped roof with projecting gables, a bullnosed verandah to the south, southeast and southwest, and timber stumps. The building is located on a level corner site fronting Wood Street to the south and Albion Street (the Cunningham Highway) to the west.

The entry, facing Wood Street to the south, is symmetrical in elevation and is composed of a central timber stair leading to the verandah, surmounted by a gable to the roof above, and flanked on either side by projecting five-sided corner bays on the southwest and southeast. Gables project above the corner bays, with the verandahs encircling them in plan. The western elevation has a central projecting gable, to which the verandah is terminated, with the kitchen wing projecting to the north. The rear of the building has enclosed verandahs, and a large single-storeyed addition on the northeast.

The roof has timber eave brackets and a central ventilator, and the projecting gables have timber finials and diagonal boarding over pressed sheeting. The verandahs have timber posts with timber capitals, timber handrails and cast iron balustrades to the projecting bay sections and entry, and cast iron brackets. The verandahs also have unusual lattice screens which consist of scalloped timber lattice which gives a star-like pattern. A brick chimney stack is located mid-way above an internal wall on the western side of the building, and the rear kitchen wing shows evidence of alterations to windows and an early addition to the northern end. The western elevation has decorative window hoods consisting of cast iron brackets with corrugated iron hood and timber sides, and the central window hood has a gable with finial.

The building has sash windows, French doors with patterned glass panels and fanlights opening onto verandahs, and decorative leadlight sash windows to the projecting southwest and southeast corner bays. These windows have leadlight, in a geometric pattern, to the bottom panel only. The main entry door assembly consists of a central door with solid bottom panel and leadlight upper panels, and leadlight panels to the fanlight and sidelights featuring a floral design.

Internally, Aberfoyle has six rooms opening off a central corridor with a kitchen wing at the rear. The front two guest rooms have curtained off projecting corner bays with leadlight windows and cedar frames, with the southwest bay containing a photographic image of a picturesque railway line in a bush location (possibly on the Cairns- Kuranda or the Spring Bluff rail line) set within a glass panel in the centre of a leadlight window. The southeast bay has a textured glass panel in place of a similar image which was originally located there.

Aberfoyle has ornate pressed metal ceilings and cornices, woodgraining to internal doors with fretwork panels above, and stencilled friezes, with a portion of the original frieze surviving intact in the entry foyer. Internal walls are lined with vertically jointed boards, and some early changes involving doorways and partition walls are evident in the fabric. The entry foyer has an arched timber opening to the narrower hall beyond, and the two middle bedrooms have early linoleum floor coverings.

The living/dining room has a non-original timber fireplace surround, and the chimney has been sealed. A timber door with textured glass upper panels provides access to the adjacent kitchen, but is not in its original position. The northeast bedroom retains the upper portion of a partition wall which originally separated a former adjacent bathroom which contained a sunken bath. A recently constructed bathroom is located adjacent in the northeast corner of the enclosed verandah.

A timber door with coloured glass upper panels, fanlight and sidelights, separates the hall from the enclosed rear verandah. The rear kitchen wing has undergone several changes, including the kitchen being refitted, but retains the upper portion of a partition wall which originally separated a maids room. The early addition on the northern end contains a study with working fireplace, and an internal bathroom has been constructed within the inside corner of the enclosed rear verandah.

A large single-storeyed addition has been constructed on the northeast, and contains living spaces and a garage. A deck has been constructed on the northwest, and an inground swimming pool is located on the northeast.

The grounds include three large camphor laurel trees along the Albion Street frontage, and terracotta tiled paths lead from the front gate to the entrance off Wood Street, and a side path from Albion Street to the verandah near the living/dining room. The paths have Marseilles tiles with edgings in a cabled design, also referred to as a rope or barley-twist design, and the entrance path has been reconstructed in places with tiles from the side path.

== Heritage listing ==
Aberfoyle was listed on the Queensland Heritage Register on 5 August 1996 having satisfied the following criteria.

The place is important in demonstrating the evolution or pattern of Queensland's history.

Constructed in 1910, Aberfoyle is a substantial timber house which demonstrates the growth of this area of Warwick during the 1910s; a period of commercial and social expansion for the town, following closer settlement.

The place is important because of its aesthetic significance.

The decorative architectural composition of this substantially intact residence, along with its surrounding plantings and quality fittings and finishes, makes an important aesthetic contribution to the local streetscape and Warwick townscape.

The place has a special association with the life or work of a particular person, group or organisation of importance in Queensland's history.

Aberfoyle is of importance as it was designed for Peter Alexander Affleck by local architect Hugh Hamilton Campbell who previously designed Westhall, a property at Freestone Creek, for Affleck's mother.
