= Federation architecture =

Architectural style in Australia

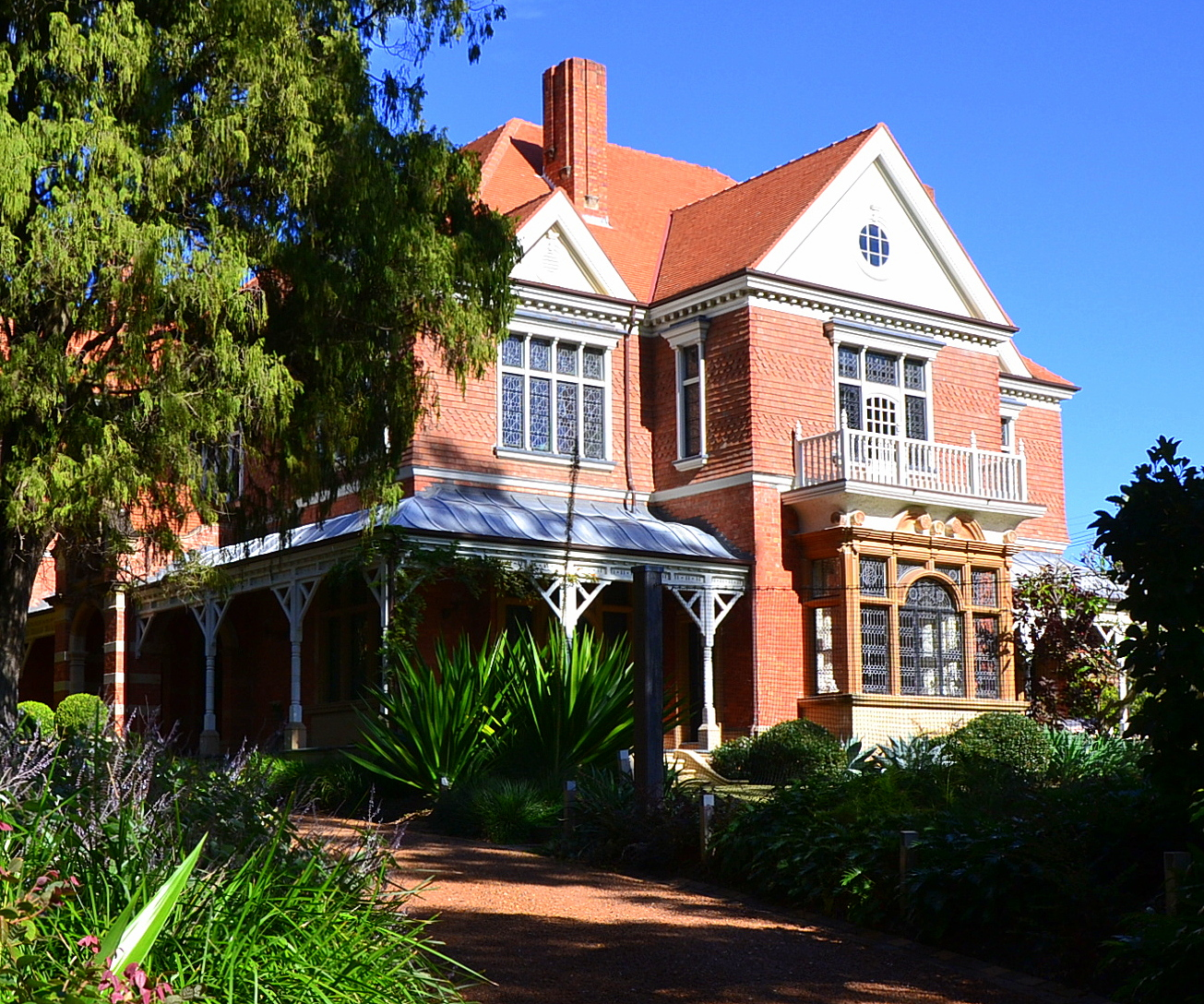
Caerleon, located in Bellevue Hill, New South Wales, was the first Queen Anne-style home in Australia. It is listed on the Register of the National Estate.

Federation architecture is the architectural style in Australia that was prevalent from around 1890 to 1915. The name refers to the Federation of Australia on 1 January 1901, when the British colonies of Australia collectively became the Commonwealth of Australia.

The architectural style had antecedents in the Queen Anne style and Edwardian style of the United Kingdom, combined with various other influences like the Arts and Crafts style. Other styles also developed, like the Federation Warehouse style, which was heavily influenced by the Romanesque Revival style. In Australia, Federation architecture is generally associated with cottages in the Queen Anne style, but some consider that there were twelve main styles that characterised the Federation period.

== Definition and features ==
The Federation period overlaps the Edwardian period, which was so named after the reign of King Edward VII (1901–1910); however, as the style preceded and extended beyond Edward's reign, the term "Federation architecture" was coined in 1969.

Federation architecture has many similarities to Edwardian Baroque architecture; however, there are significant differences that distinguish the Federation architecture style from the Edwardian Baroque architecture style, particularly due to the embracing of Australiana themes and the use of the verandah in domestic settings. Australian flora and fauna are prominently featured, and stylised images of the New South Wales waratah, flannel flower, Queensland firewheel tree, and other flowers, and the kangaroo, kookaburra, and lyrebird, were common. The Coat of Arms, and rising sun, representing a new dawn in the country of Australia, also appeared regularly on gables.

Some Federation buildings, both residential and non-residential, were listed on the now defunct Register of the National Estate, and various state heritage registers, because of their heritage values.

=== Gardens and garden architecture ===
Gardens of the period were complex and contained many elements—generally a wider variety of plants than is seen in contemporary plantings, pergolas, rose arches, gazebos and summerhouses. Wooden lattice fences were used to partition parts of the garden off, particularly the front from the more private back. Garden paths could be straight or gently curved, and often edged with glazed edging tiles or bricks, and made of tiles, packed gravel or bricks. patterns for brick paving include stretcher bond, herringbone and basketweave. Asphalt and concrete were not used.

Plants were selected to produce year-round colour and interest in the local climate conditions. Initially, evergreen trees were used, but the denseness of shade led to increasing popularity of deciduous trees such as Jacaranda, flowering plum and peppercorn. Palms often framed the garden vista, and the native Cootamundra wattle was popular, as were shrubs such as camellias and standard roses. Conservatories contained begonias and Adiantum ferns.

== Styles ==
There are twelve styles that predominated in the Federation period:

- Federation Academic Classical
- Federation Free Classical
- Federation Filigree
- Federation Anglo-Dutch
- Federation Romanesque
- Federation Gothic
- Federation Carpenter Gothic
- Federation Warehouse
- Federation Queen Anne
- Federation Free Style
- Federation Arts and Crafts
- Federation Bungalow

== Residential architecture ==
Of the twelve Federation styles, there are four that were mainly used in residential architecture. They are Federation Queen Anne style, Federation Filigree style, Federation Arts and Craft style, and Federation Bungalow style.

=== Federation Queen Anne ===
The Federation Queen Anne style was designed to embrace the outdoor life-styles of the Australian people. Most homes have asymmetric gables, white-painted window frames, front verandas with decorative timber features, tiling on the patio floor and entry paths. The brickwork is usually a deep red or dark brown, often with a mix of the two. The roofs are typically terracotta tiles with decorative gables (sometimes adorned with finials), motifs, timber features, tall chimneys and fretwork. Decorative leadlight windows are also common, as are circular windows (known as bulls-eye windows). Federation homes also have decorative internal features in the plasterwork, high ceilings and timber features.

Some outstanding examples are West Maling, Penshurst Avenue, Penshurst, New South Wales; Turramurra Ingleholme, Boomerang Street, Turramurra, New South Wales (former home of architect John Sulman); and Caerleon, Bellevue Hill, the first Queen Anne home in Australia. The Federation Queen Anne style was the most popular residential style in Australia between 1890 and 1910. It was also used for non-residential buildings, such as Perth's Rotunda Hospital.

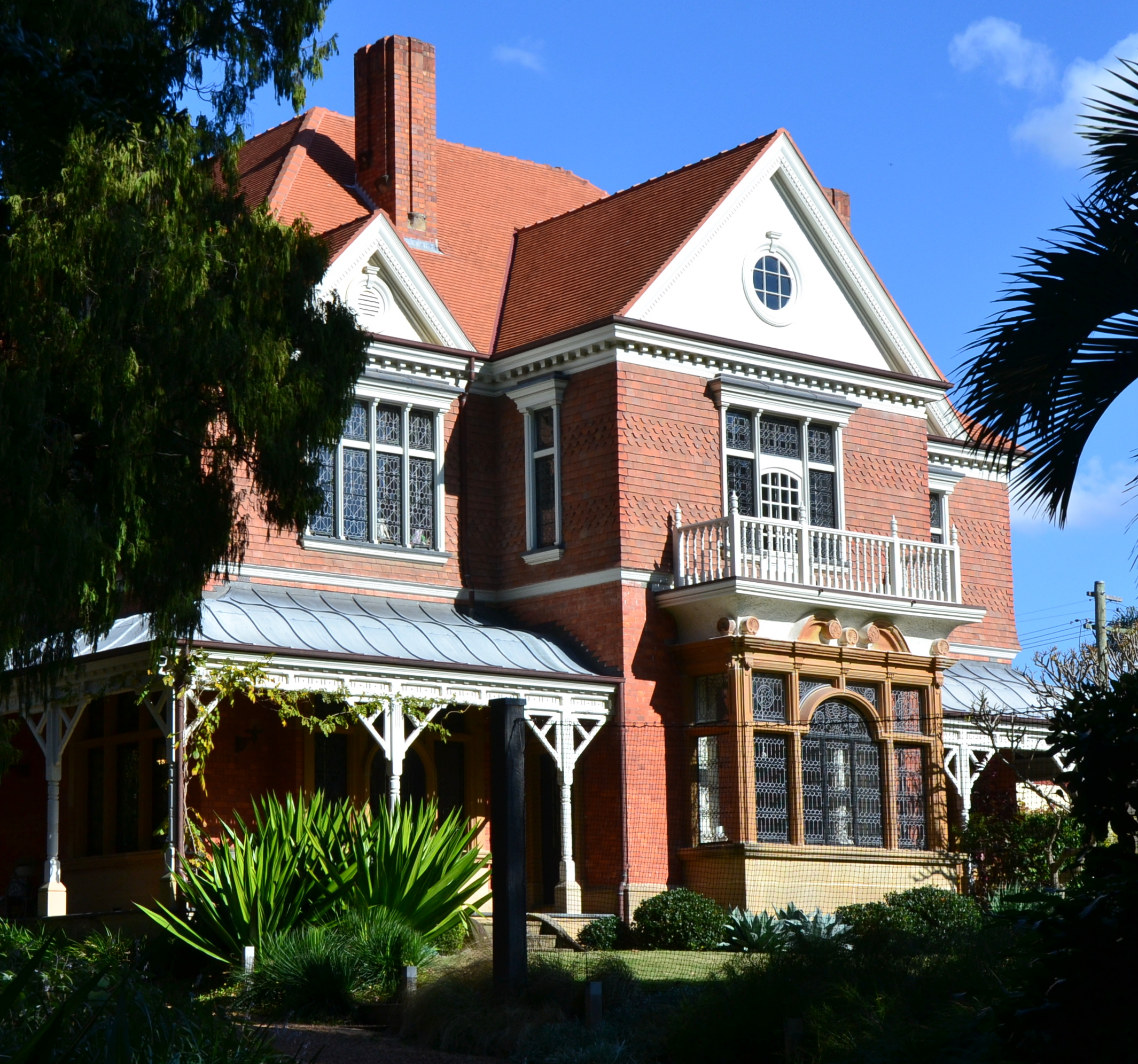
Caerleon, Bellevue Hill, New South Wales, first Queen Anne home in Australia

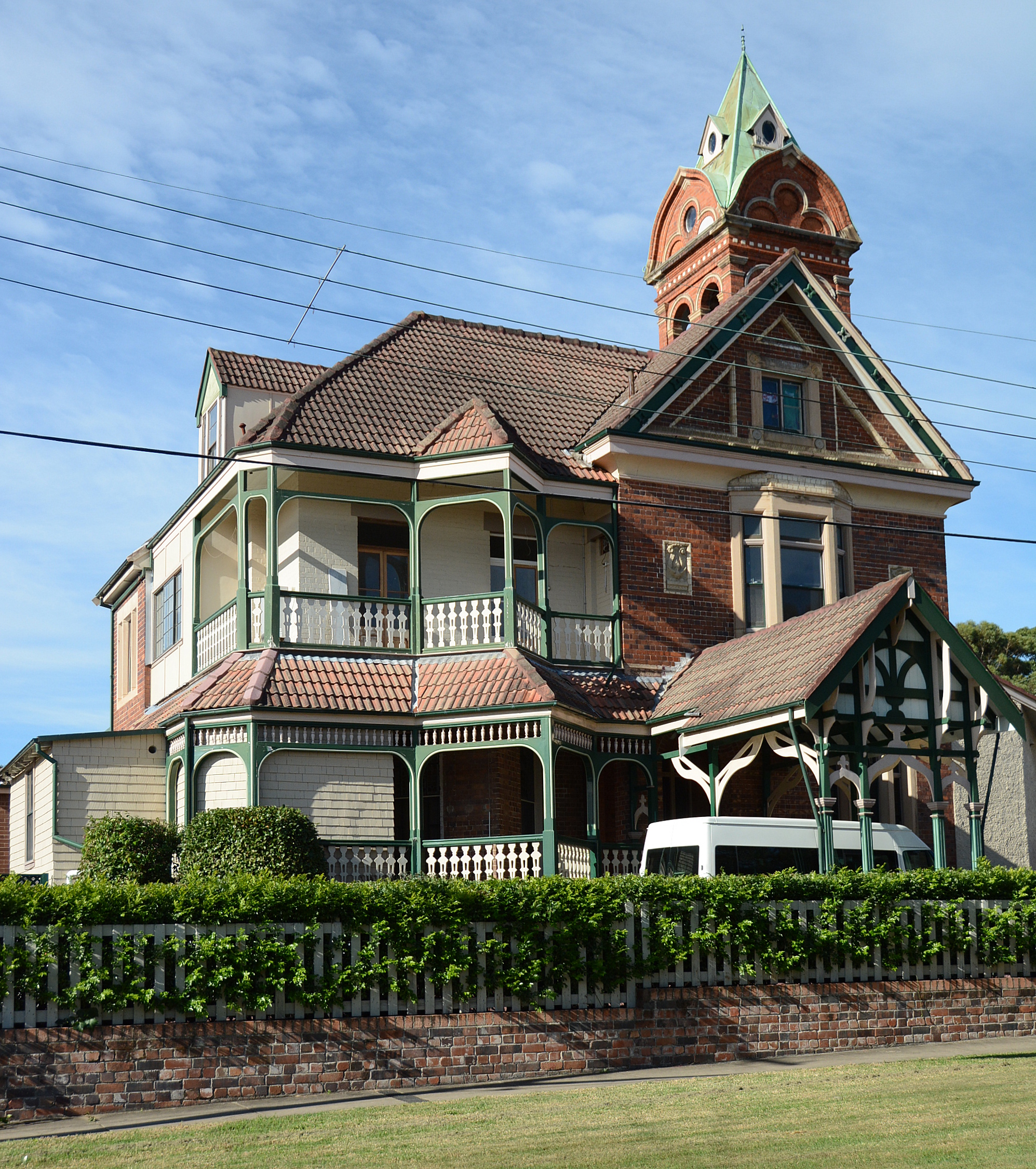
Amesbury, Ashfield, New South Wales. Built c. 1888.

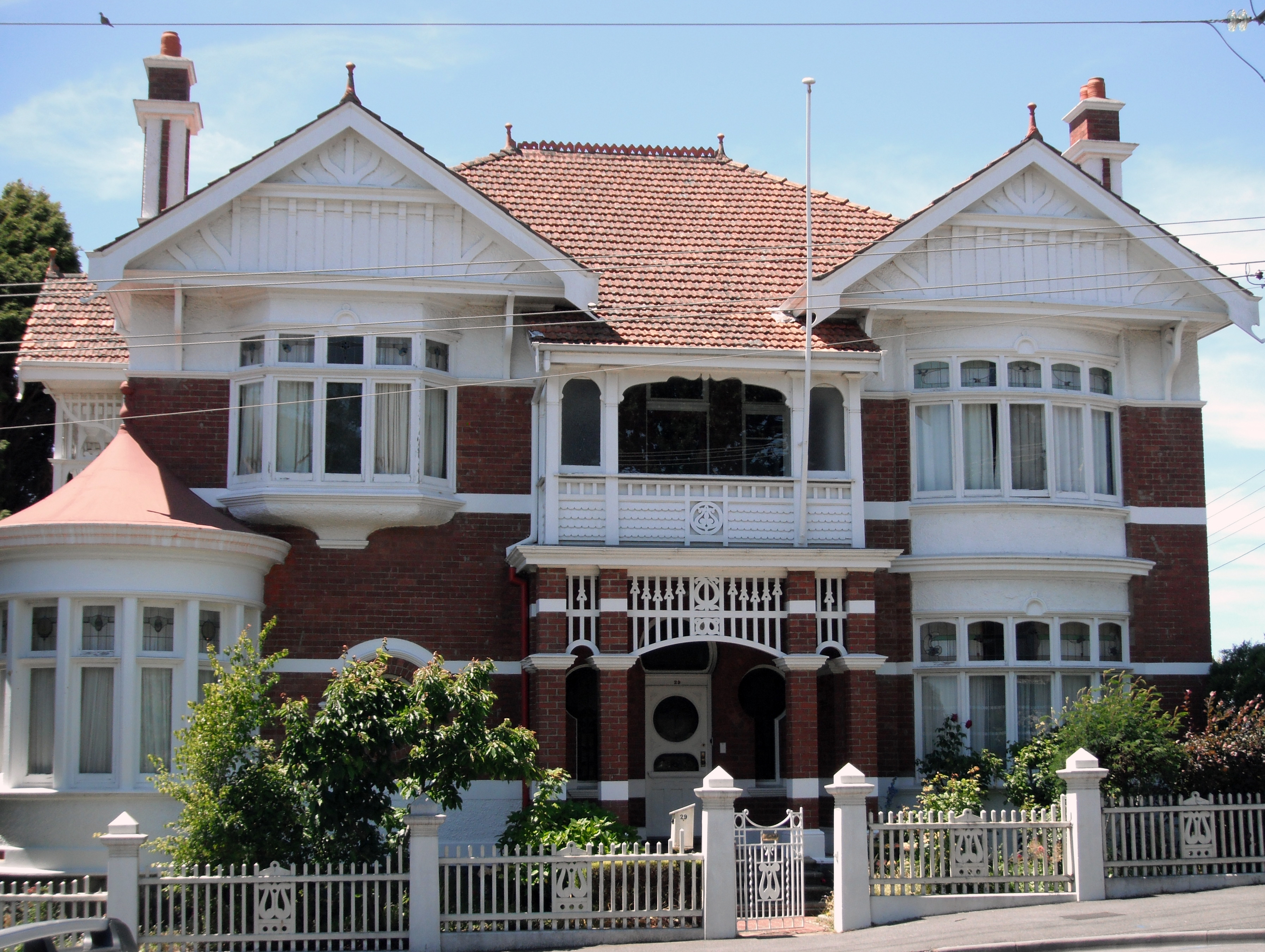
Hillcrest, Launceston, Tasmania

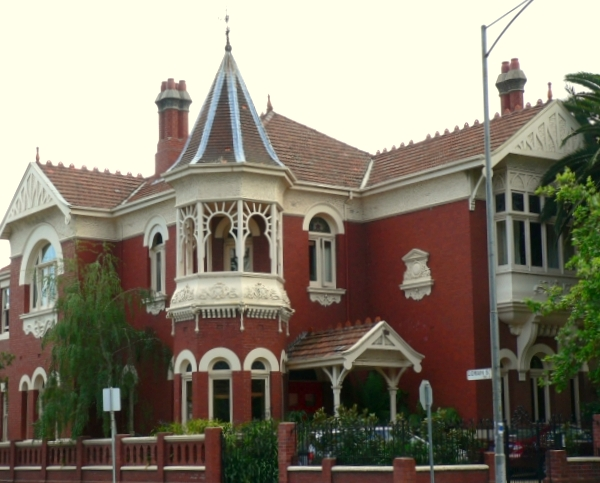
Federation Queen Anne mansion in South Yarra, Victoria

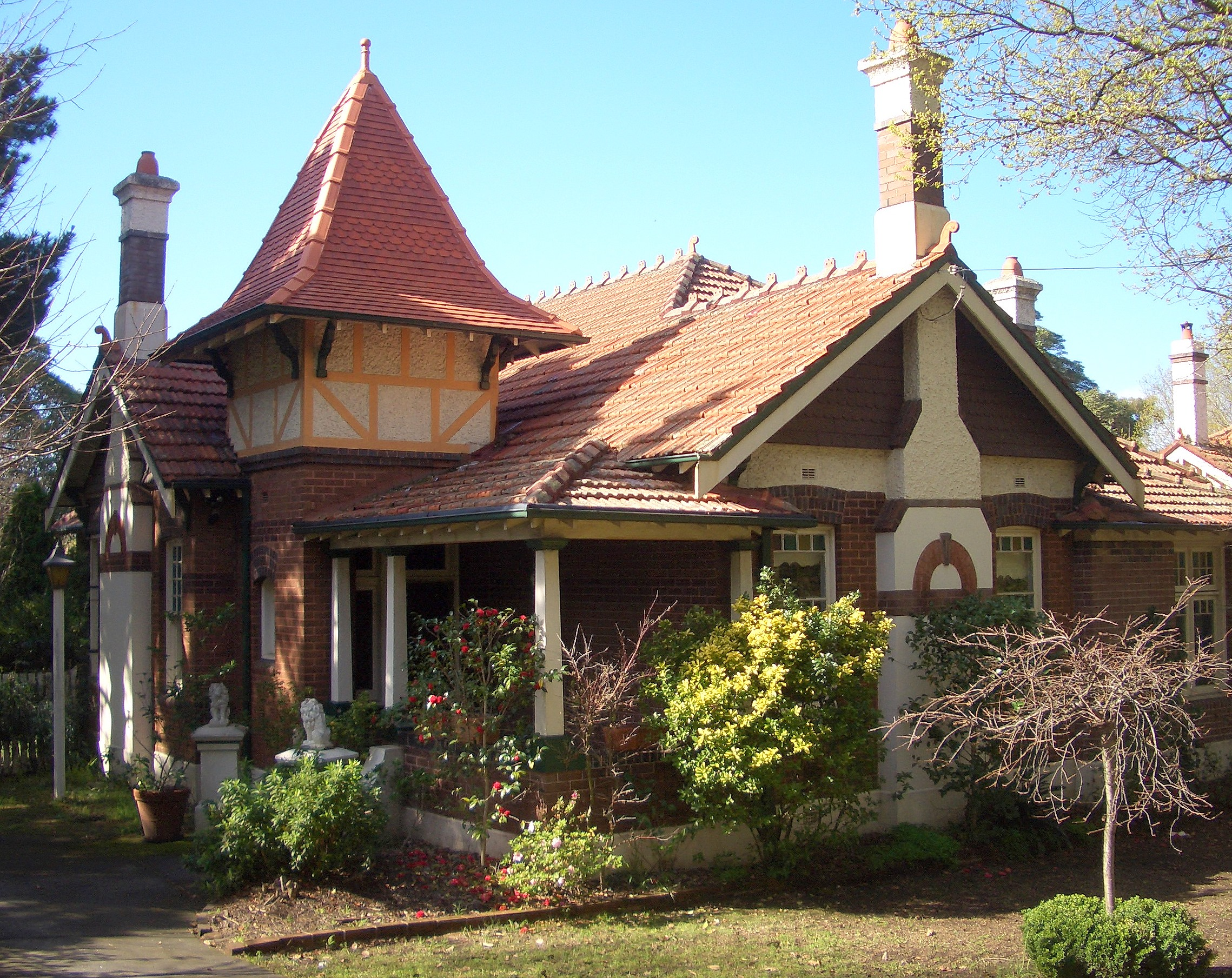
'Vallambrosa', Appian Way, Burwood, New South Wales, Federation Queen Anne style

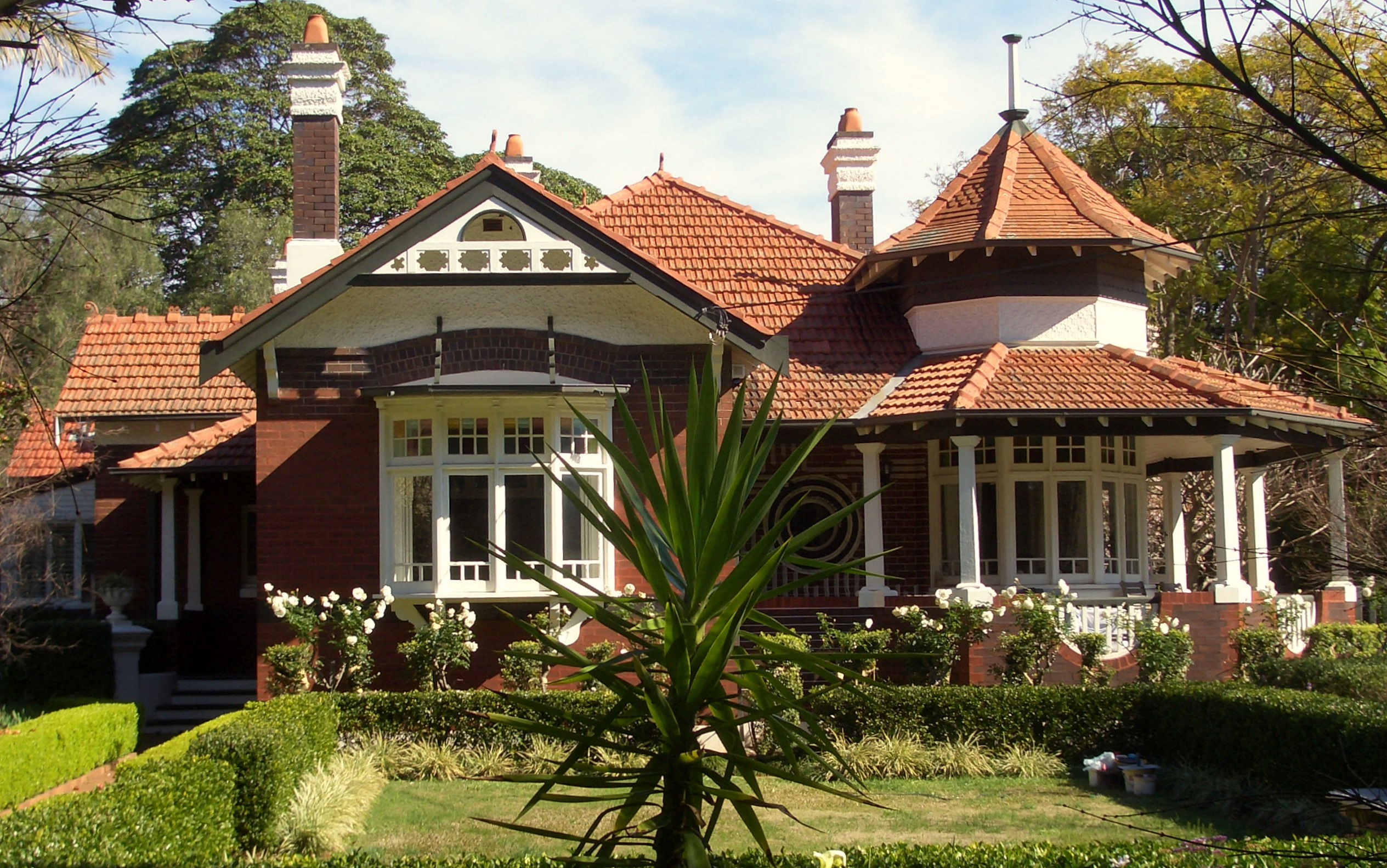
'Alba Longa', Federation Queen Anne home, Appian Way, Burwood, New South Wales

=== Federation Filigree ===
The Federation Filigree style is common in the hotter parts of Australia, especially in the north, since it is designed to create shade while allowing for the free flow of air. It is a common sight in Queensland and is sometimes known as the Queensland style. Some outstanding examples are Belltrees House, Scone, New South Wales; private home, Roderick Street, Ipswich, Queensland; and terrace of homes, east side of High Street, Millers Point, New South Wales.

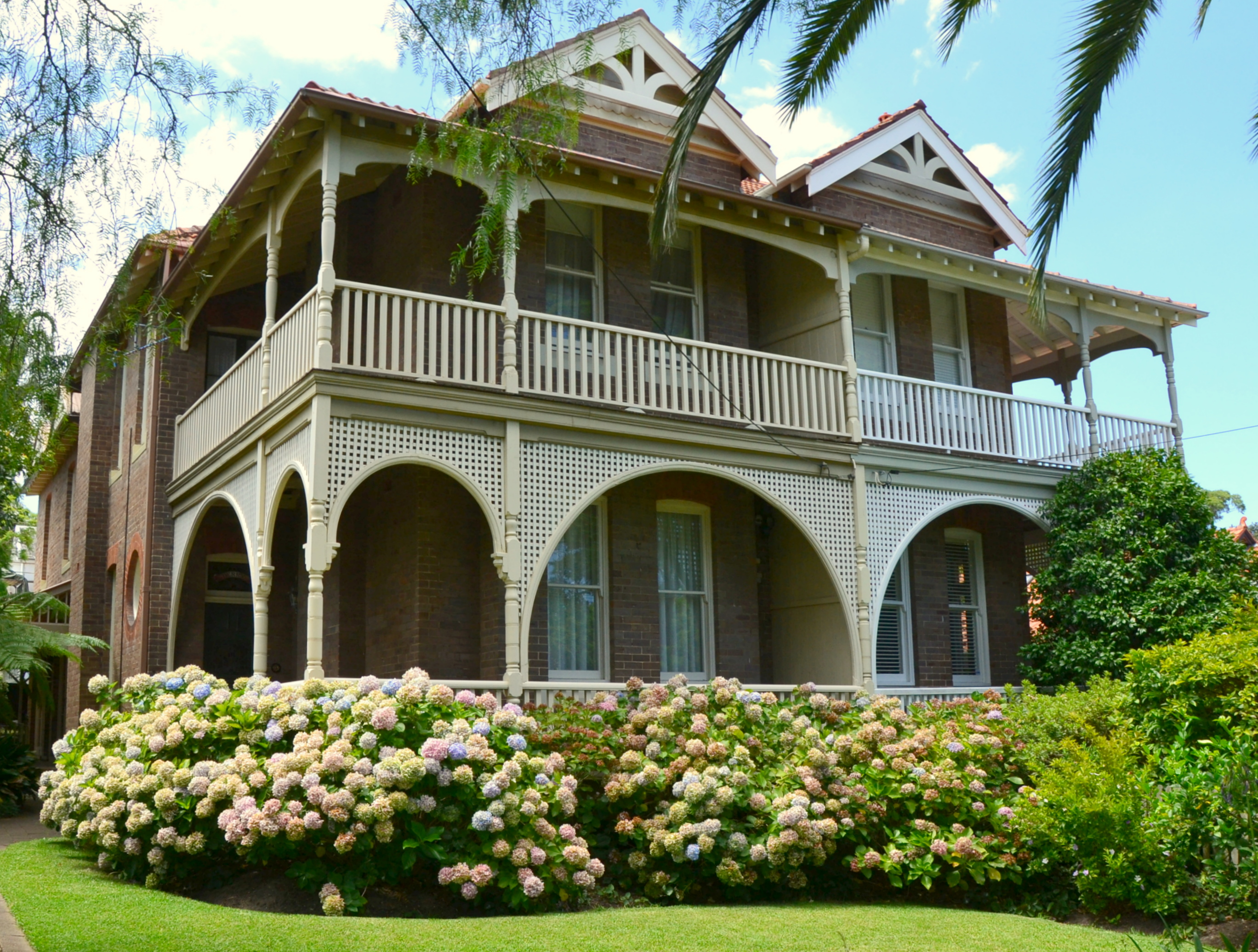
'Derry', a good example of Federation Filigree in Neutral Bay, New South Wales

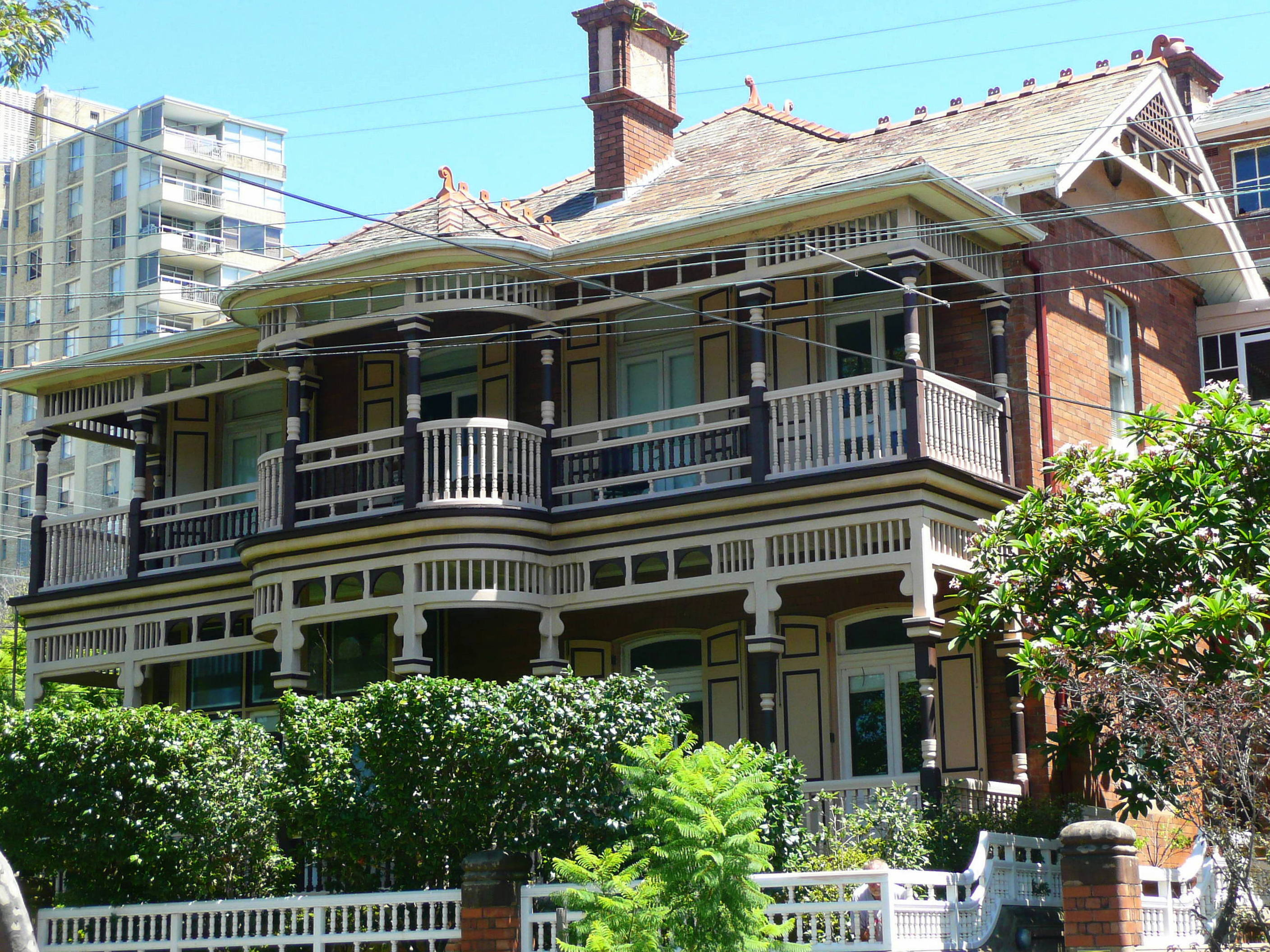
A Filligree Queen Anne style house in Woollahra, New South Wales

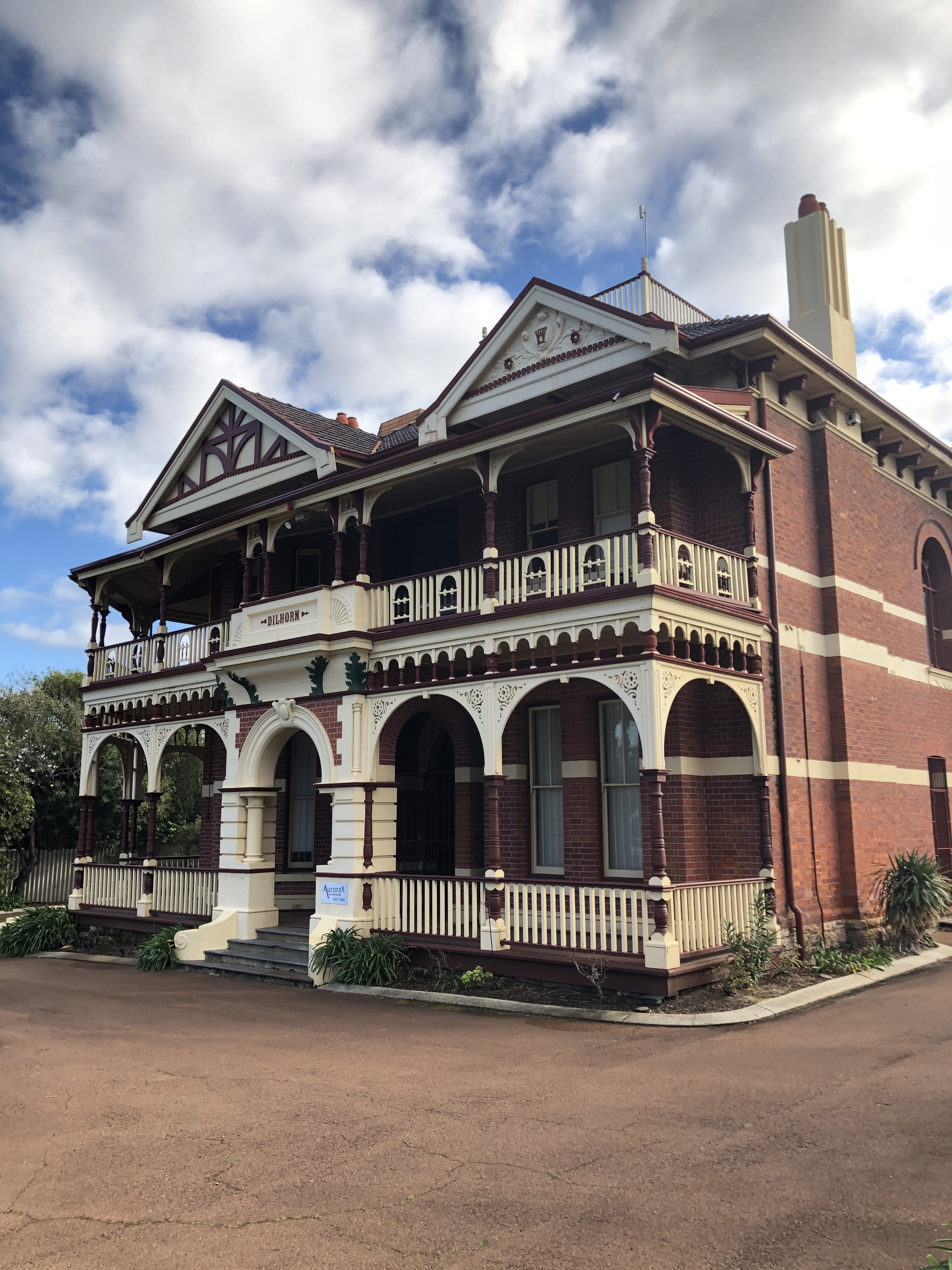
Dilhorn House, Perth

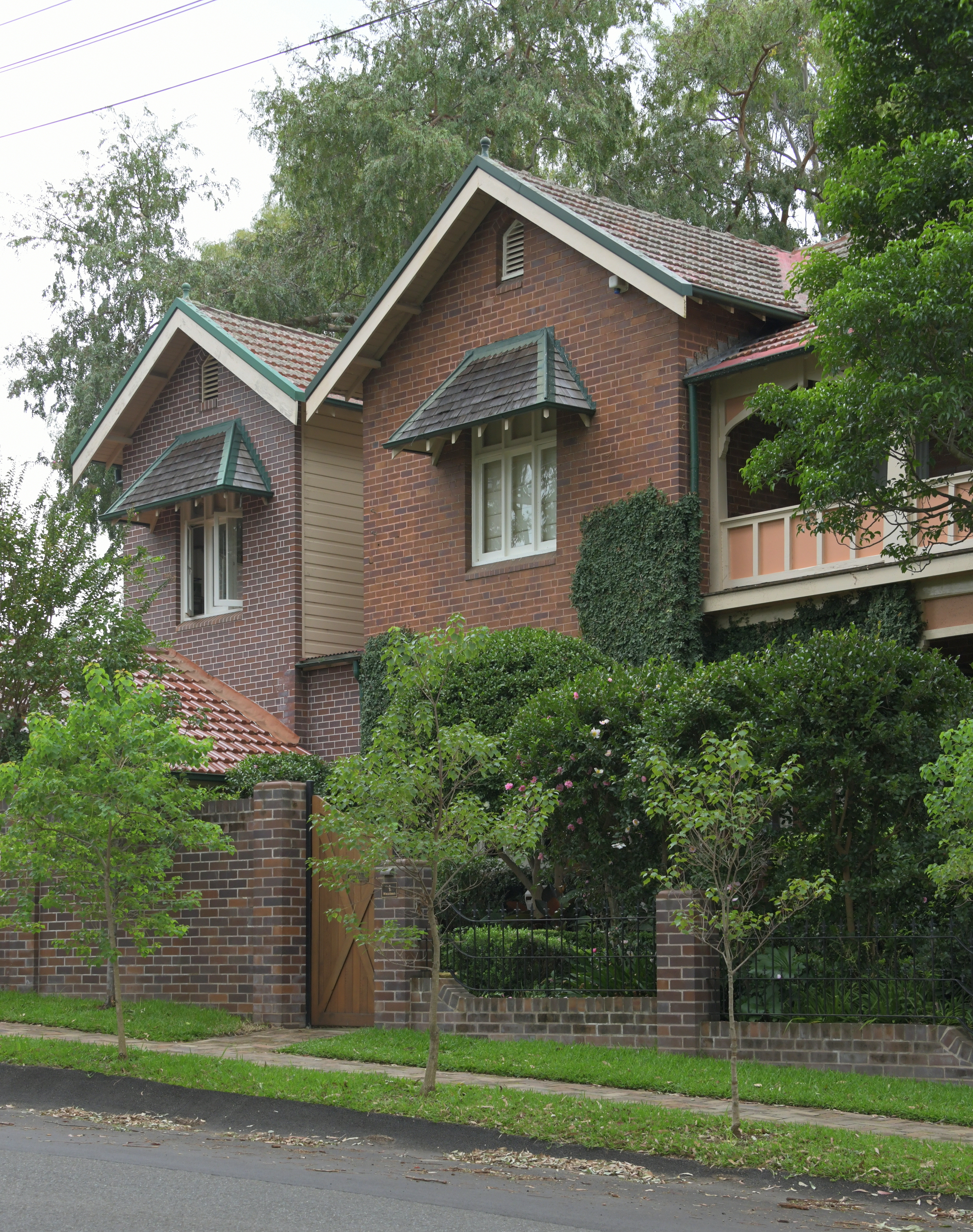
Federation Filigree, Beecroft, New South Wales

=== Federation Arts and Crafts ===
The Federation Arts and Crafts style had its origins in England, where architects were reacting to the impersonal nature of the Industrial Revolution. Crafts and handiwork were emphasised to give architecture the "human touch". These influences were absorbed into Federation Australia, where the resulting buildings were generally small-scale to medium-scale and predominantly residential. Outstanding examples are Glyn, Kooyong road, Toorak, Victoria; The Crossways, Martin Road, Centennial Park, New South Wales; and Erica, Appian Way, Burwood, New South Wales.

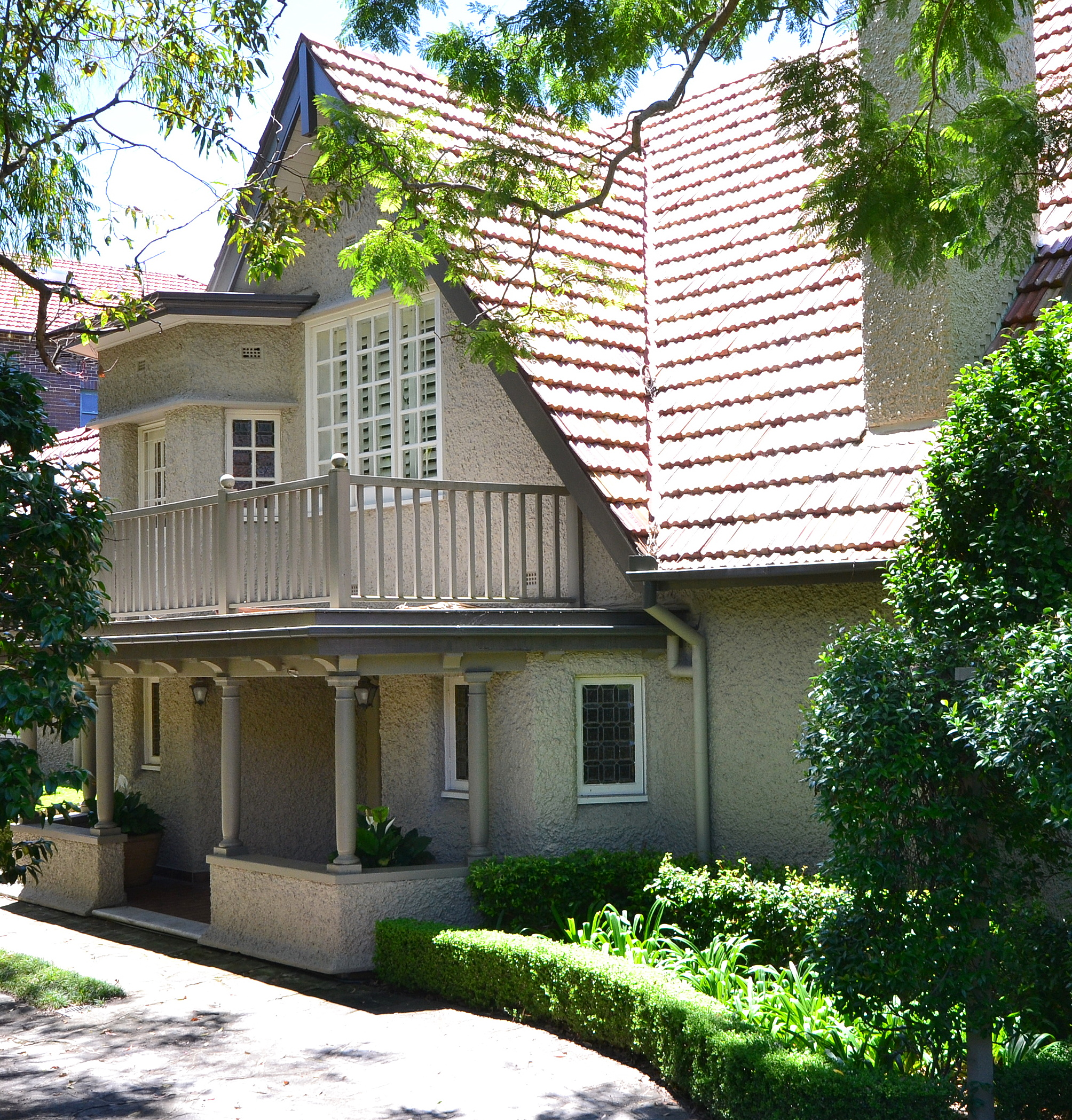
'Ailsa', Neutral Bay, New South Wales, Federation Arts and Crafts style

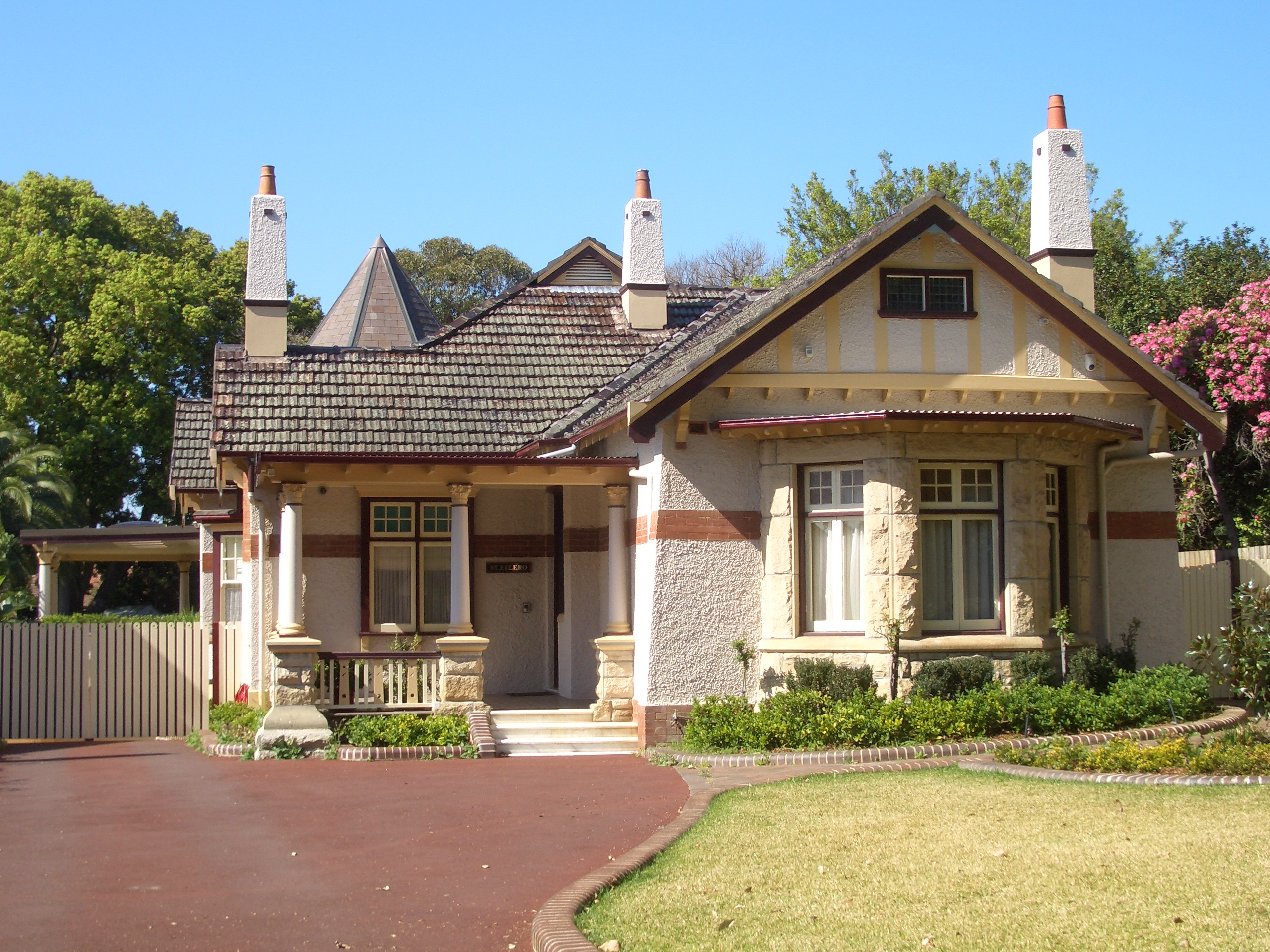
'St Ellero', 5 Appian Way, Burwood, New South Wales, Federation Arts and Crafts style

=== Federation Bungalow ===
The Federation Bungalow style was the Australian response to the bungalow style that was developed in America by people like Gustav Stickley. It can be seen as a transition phase between the Federation Queen Anne style and the California Bungalow style that took on later. Stylistically, it exploited the qualities of the bungalow while frequently retaining the flair and idiosyncrasies of the Queen Anne style, although usually in simplified form. Outstanding examples are Nee Morna, Nepean Highway, Sorrento, Victoria; Blythewood, Beecroft Road, Cheltenham New South Wales; and The Eyrie, Fox Valley Road, Wahroonga, New South Wales.

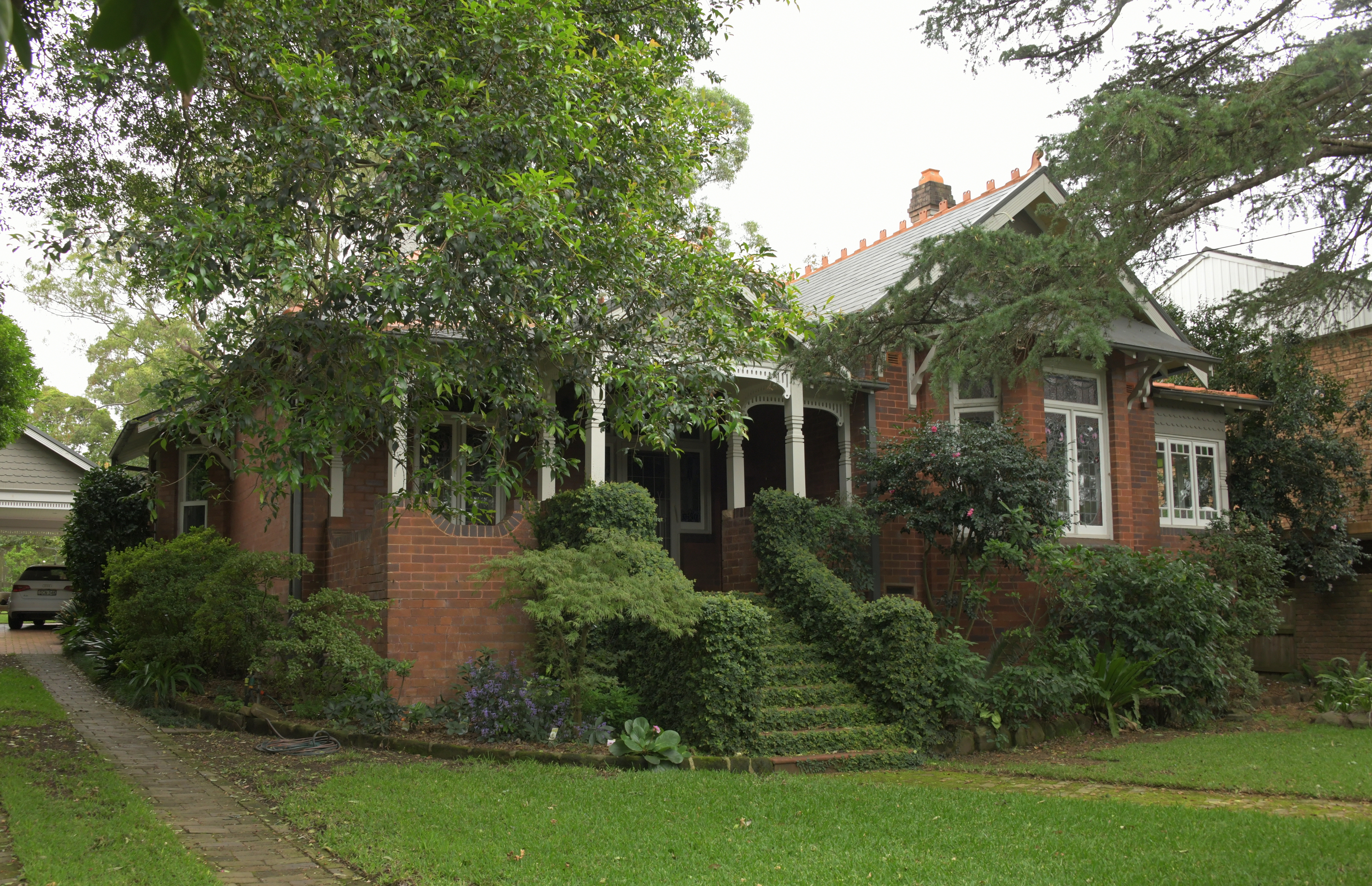
Federation cottage, Beecroft, New South Wales

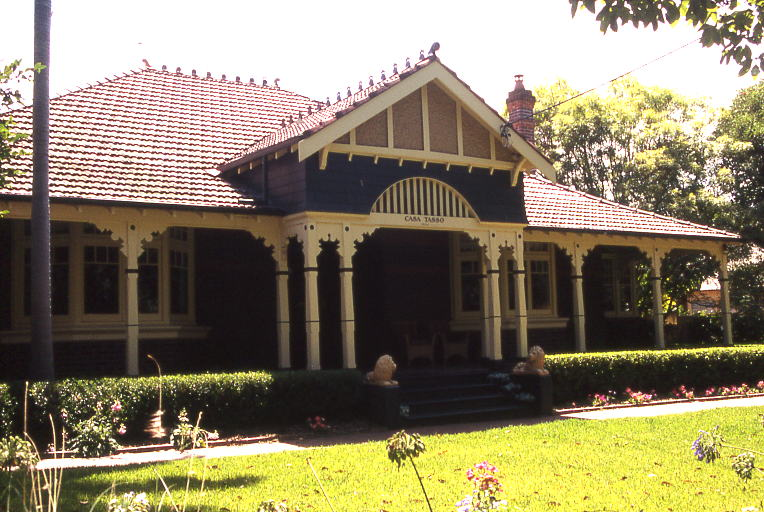
'Cassa Tasso', Appian Way, Burwood, New South Wales, Federation Bungalow

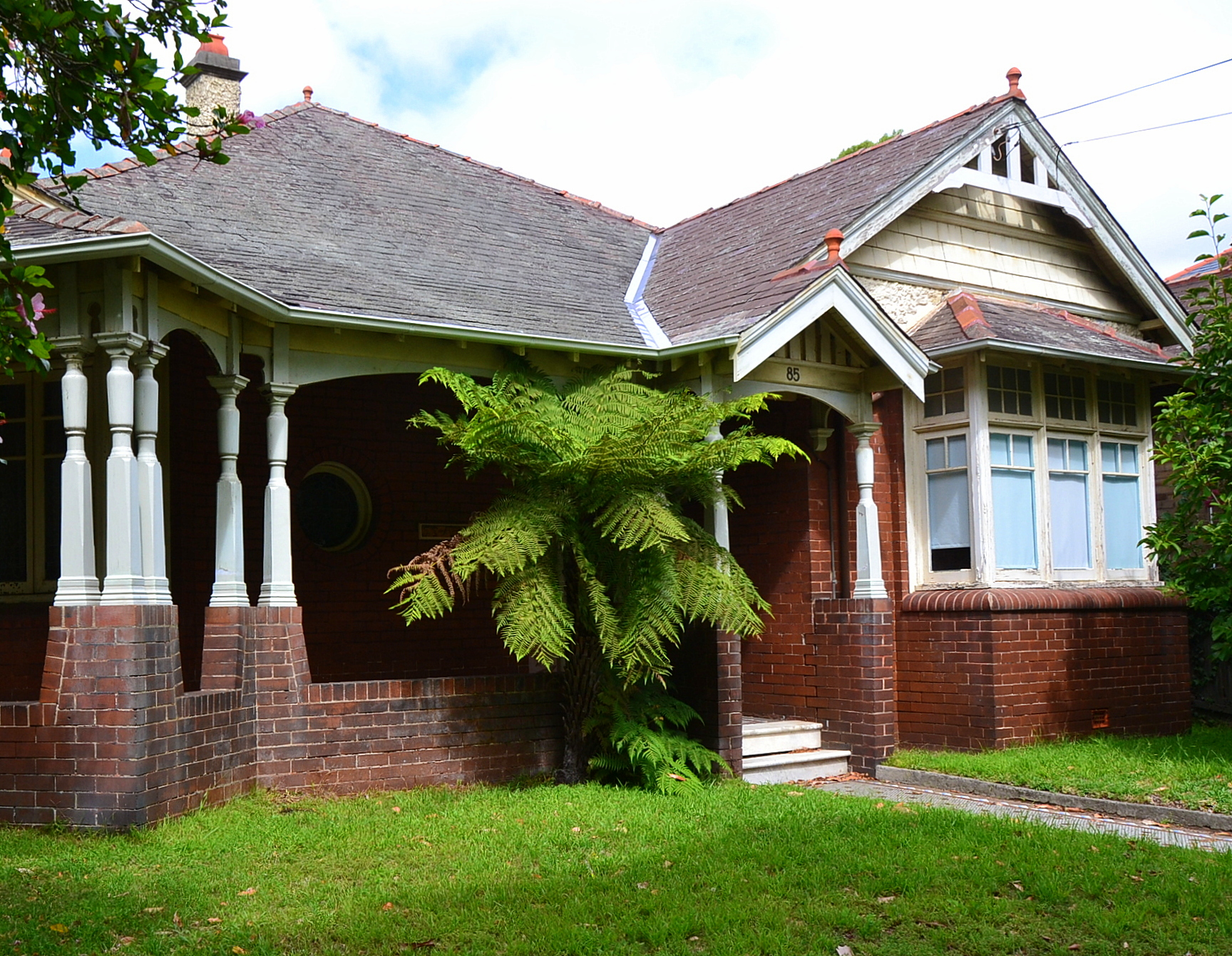
Federation Bungalow, Randwick, New South Wales

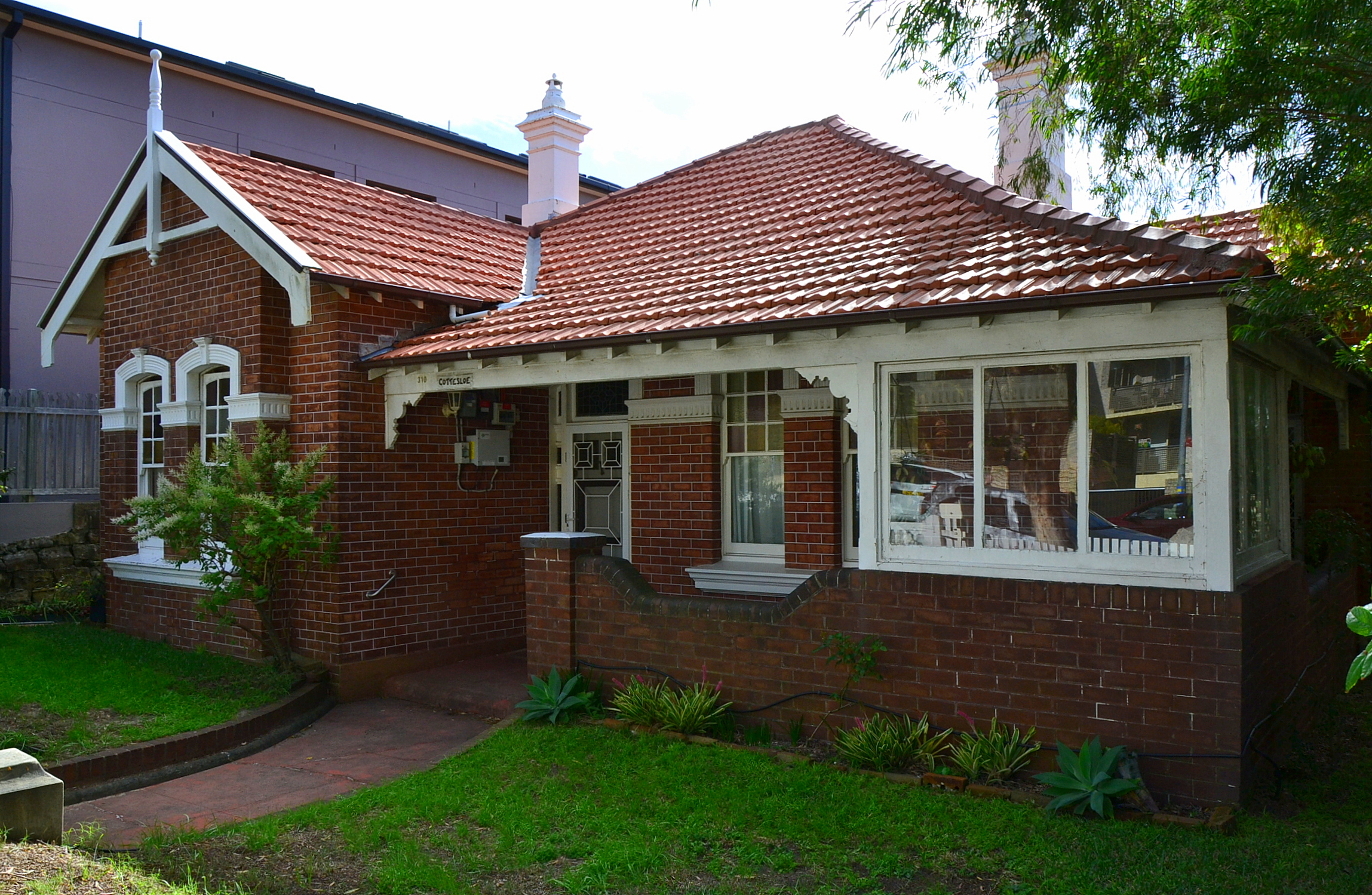
Federation Bungalow, Bondi, New South Wales, with Italianate touches

=== Federation Revival ===
During the early-1990s, many of the design elements that characterised the Federation architecture of old were popularised in mainstream architecture. This Federation revival form is also known as "mock Federation" or "faux Federation". The style was widespread within the realm of residential housing (especially in new development suburbs) and for apartment buildings; however, smaller shopping centres and other public buildings also made use of the revival style that retained widespread popularity until the early 2000s. Suburbs of Sydney that developed in the 1990s—such as Cherrybrook, Castle Hill, and Menai—are notable in the sense that large tracts of these developments contain almost exclusively Federation revival homes.

The construction of Federation revival architecture varied little from that of other basic styles, with the Federation elements merely forming the facade and decorating elements of the building. For example, the typical brick and roof tile construction, hexagonal turrets, ornate gable work, finials, prominent verandah, steep pitched roofs, and faceted bay windows served to parallel the traditional Federation architecture.

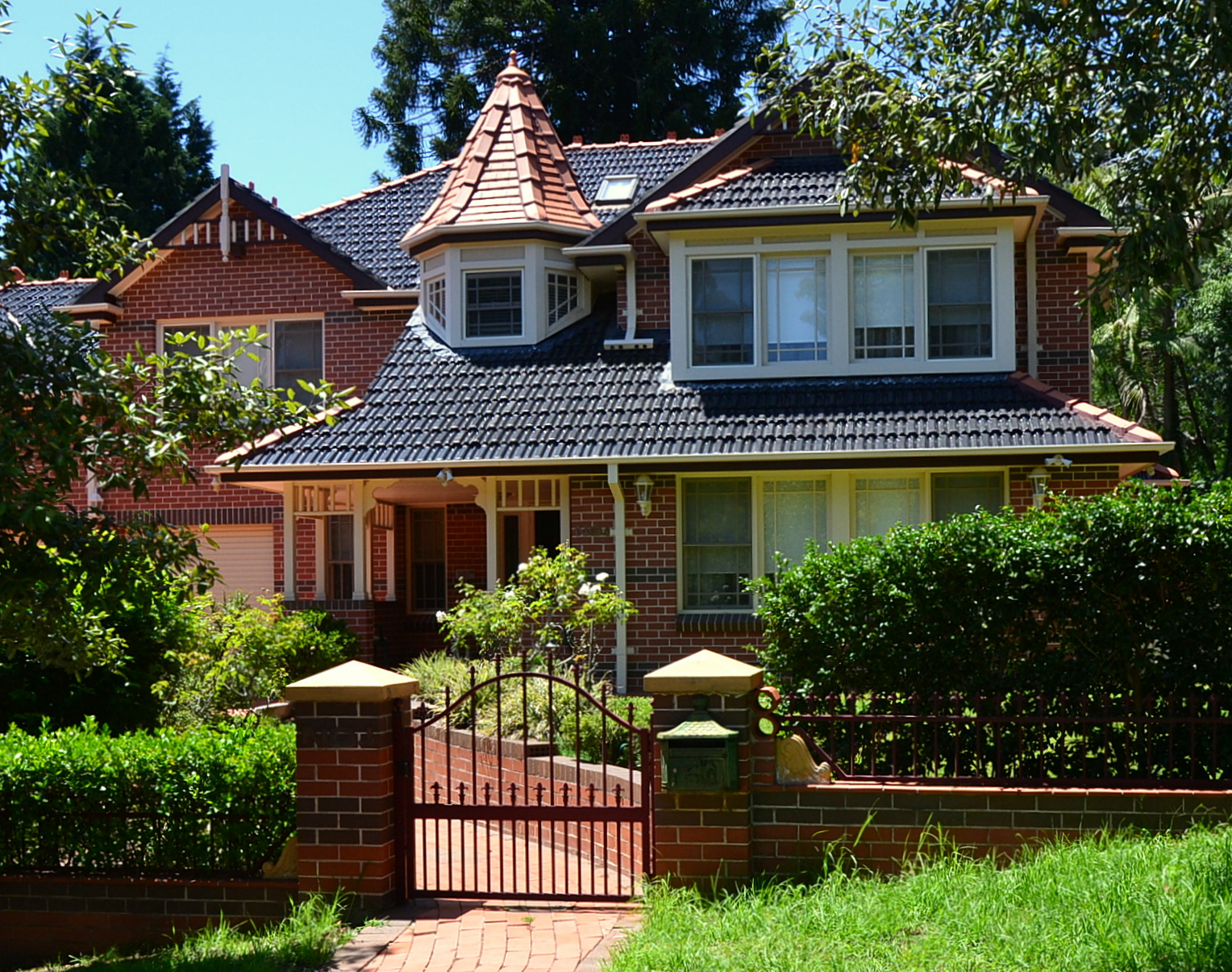
Federation revival home in Wahroonga, Sydney

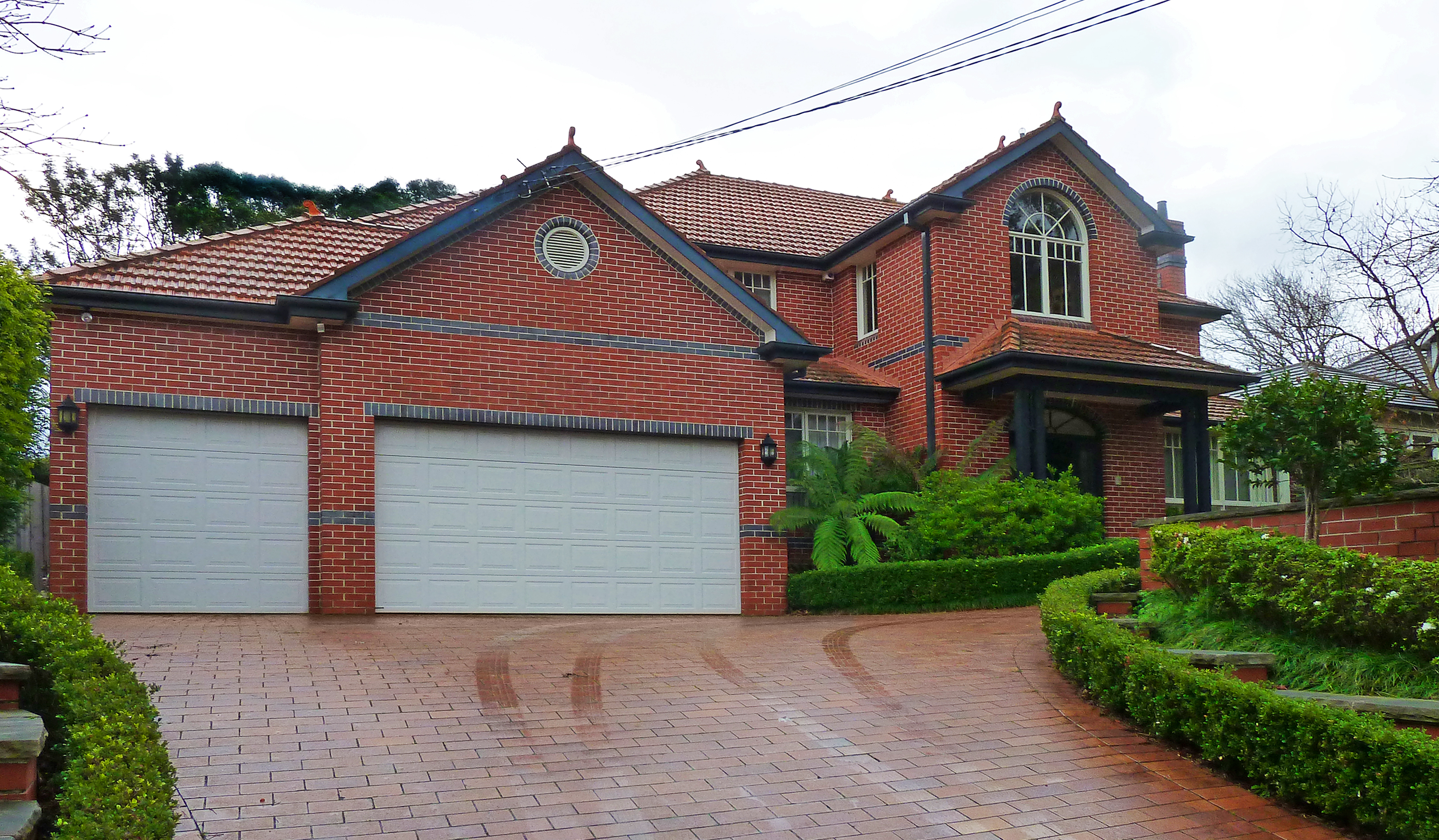
Federation revival home in Roseville, Sydney (1994)

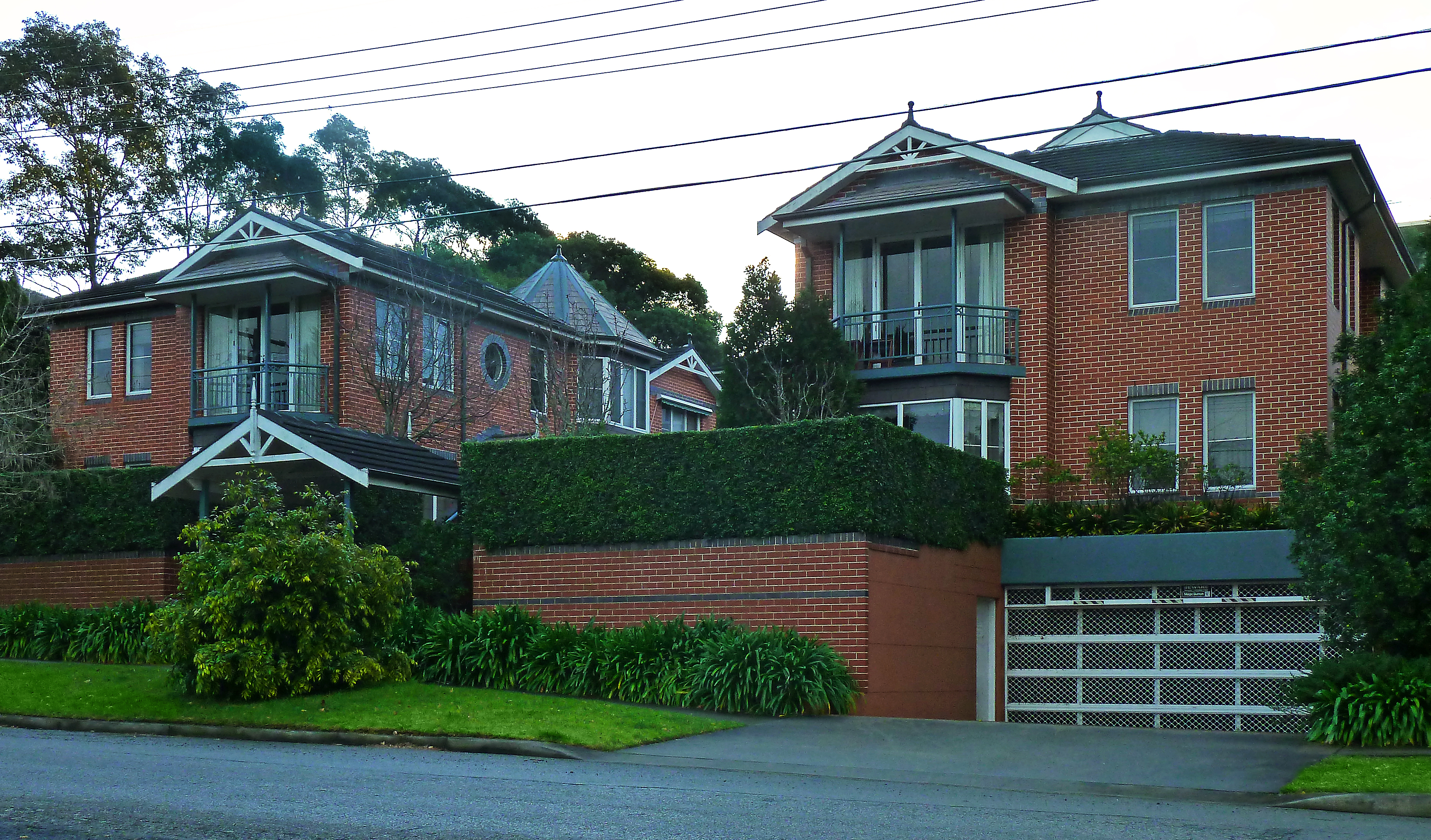
Federation revival apartments in Lindfield, Sydney (1996)

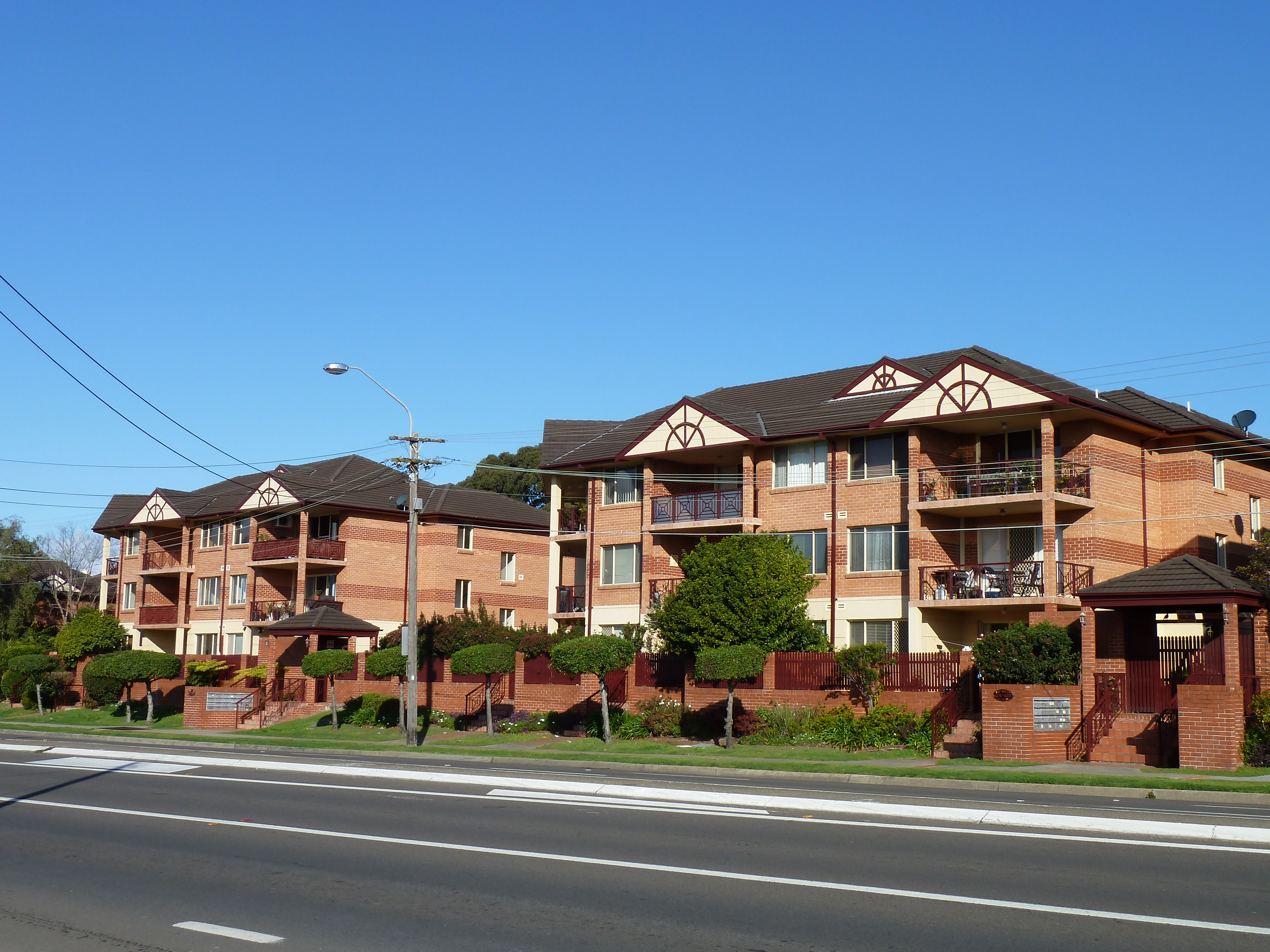
Federation revival apartments in Miranda, Sydney (c. 1993)

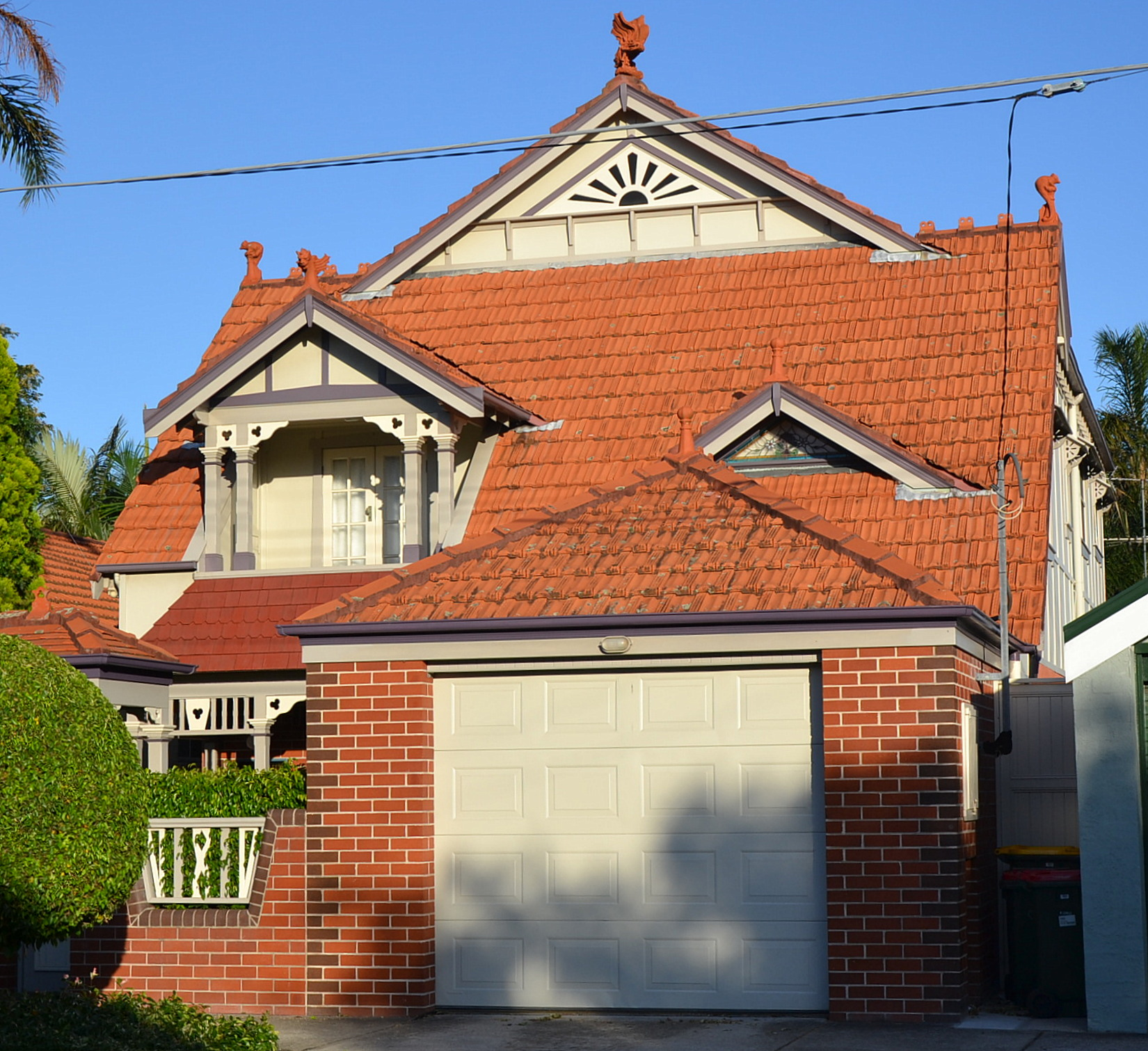
Federation revival house in Kingsford, Sydney

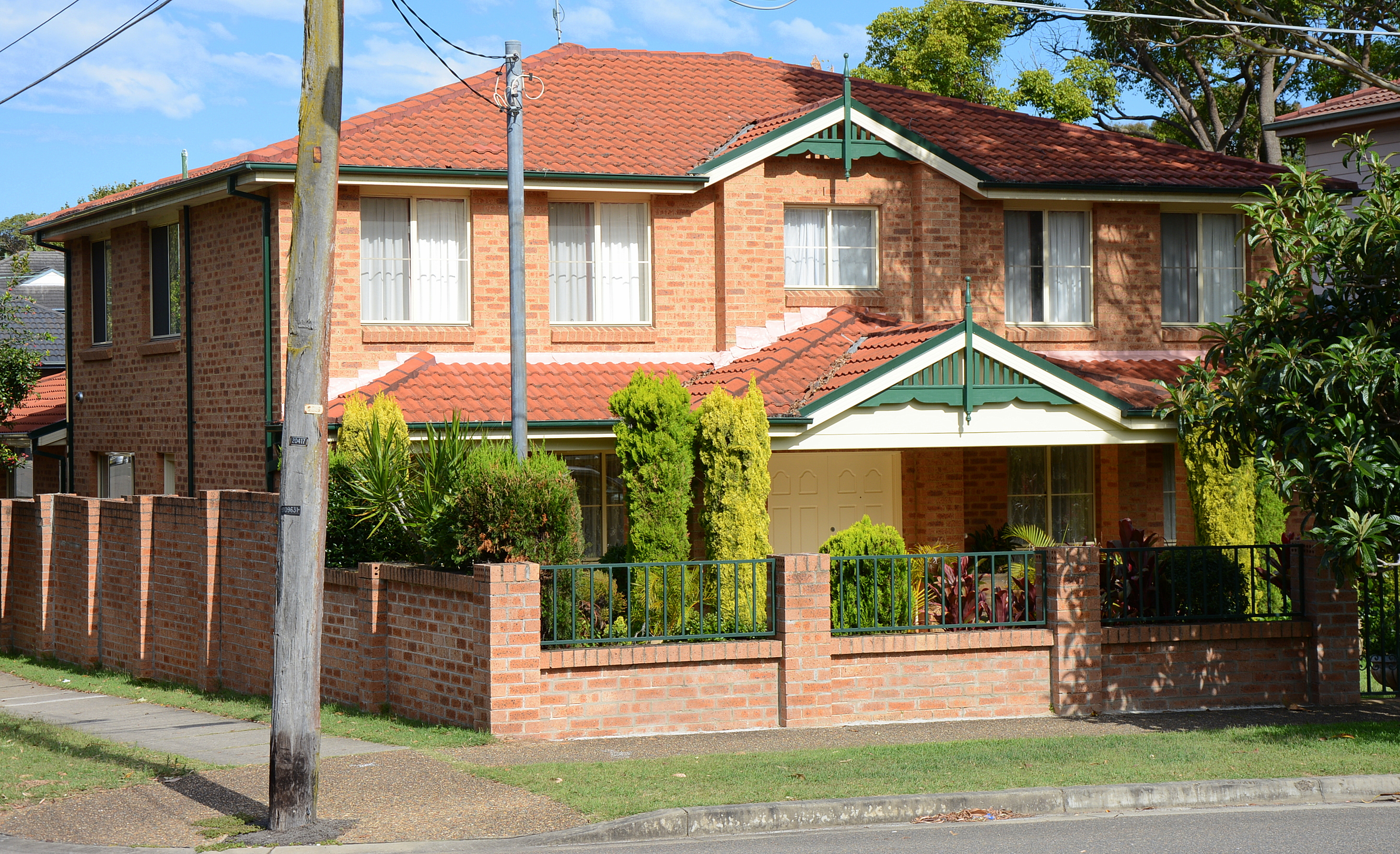
Federation revival house in Kensington, Sydney

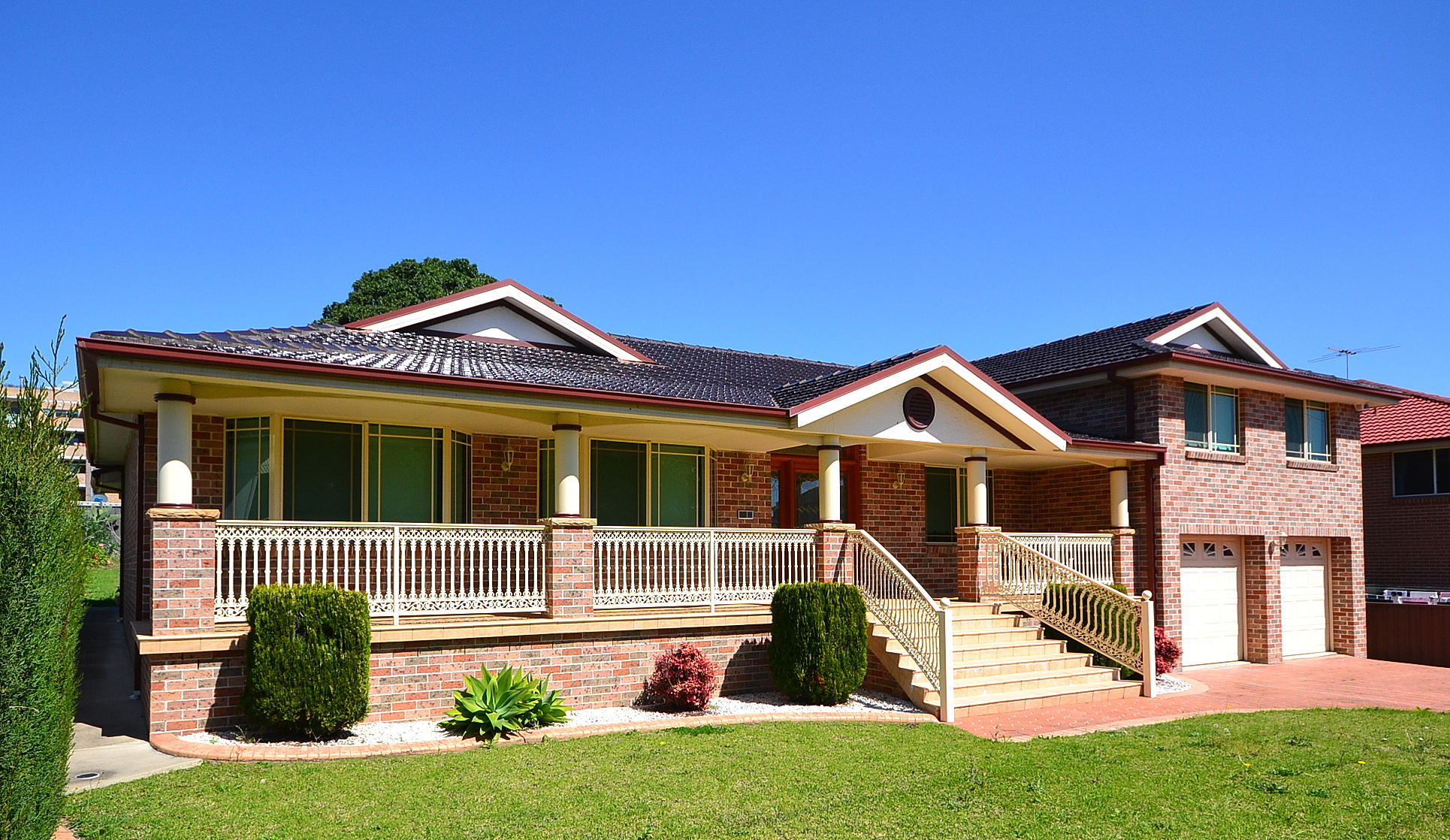
A house in Blacktown, Greater Western Sydney

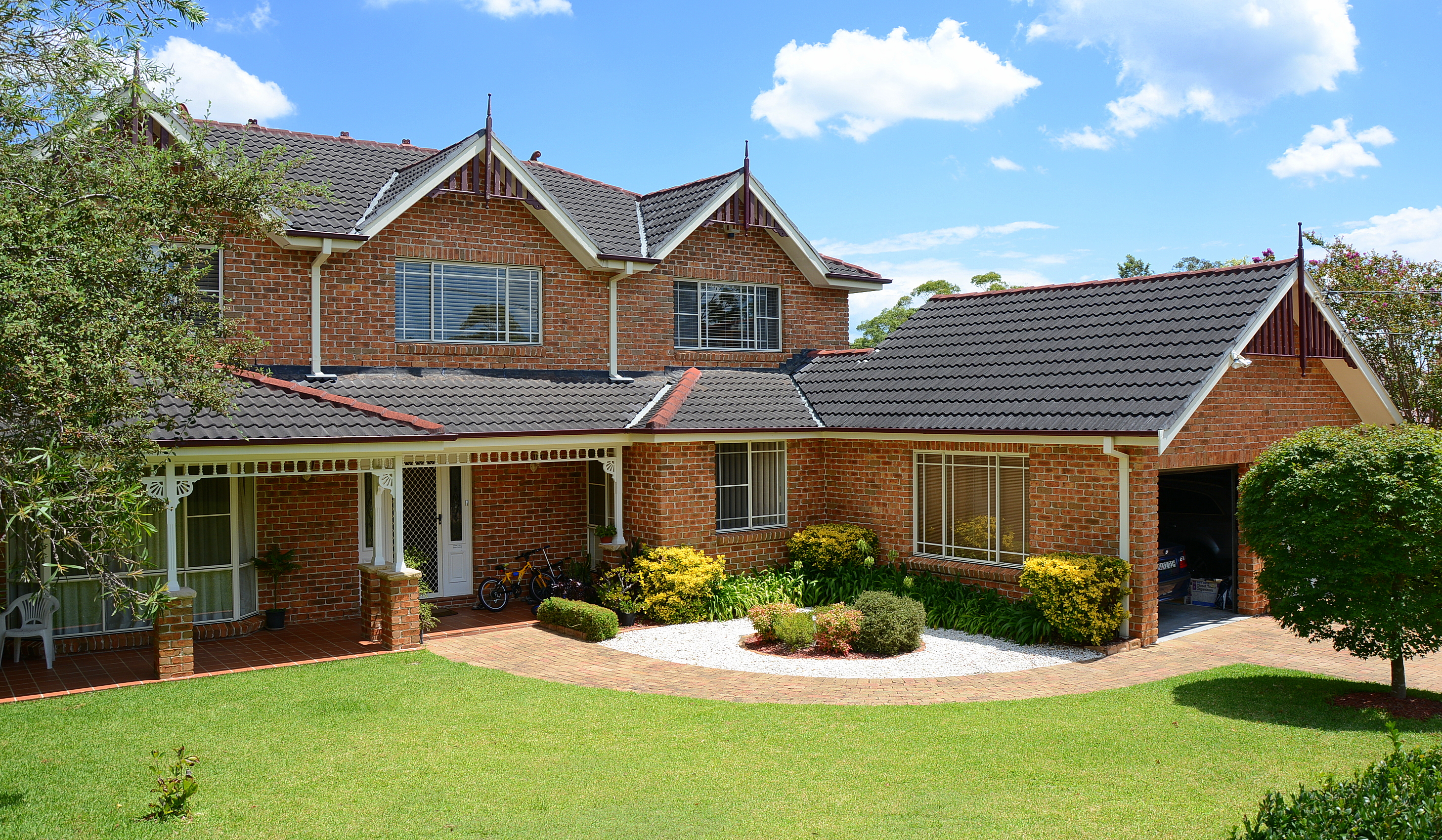
A house in Hornsby, Sydney

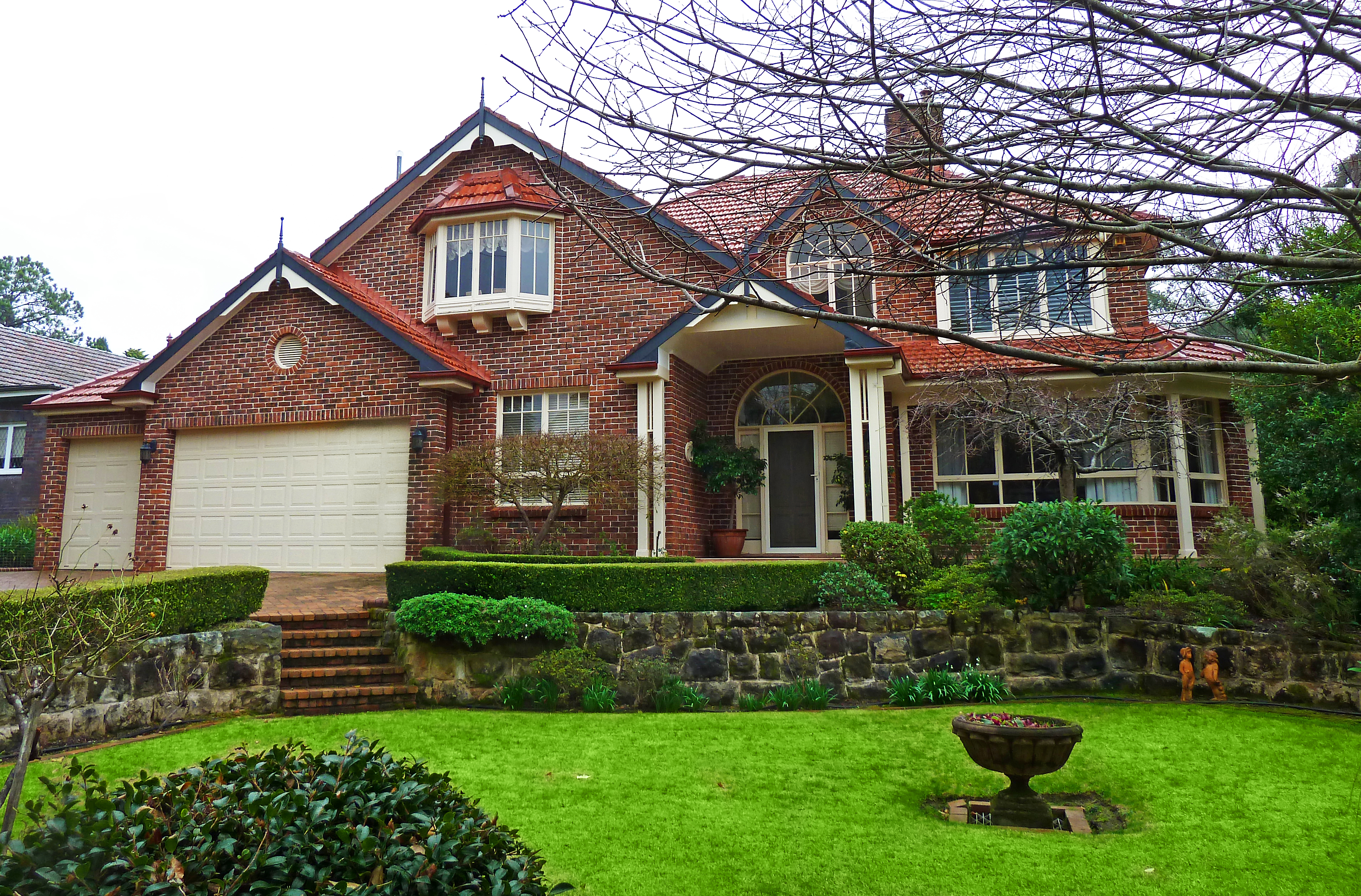
Roseville, Sydney (1994)

== Non-residential architecture ==
Federation non-residential buildings can be in any of the twelve styles. The following gallery shows some examples of non-residential buildings.

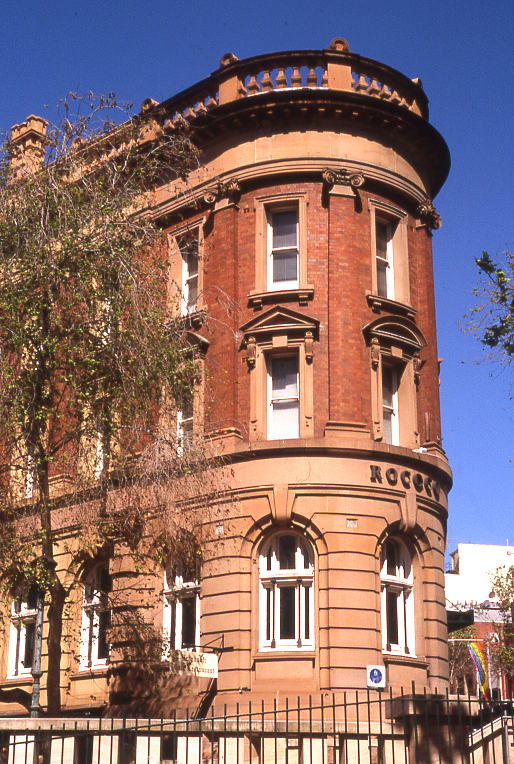
Former bank building, Oxford Street, Darlinghurst, New South Wales (Federation Free Classical)

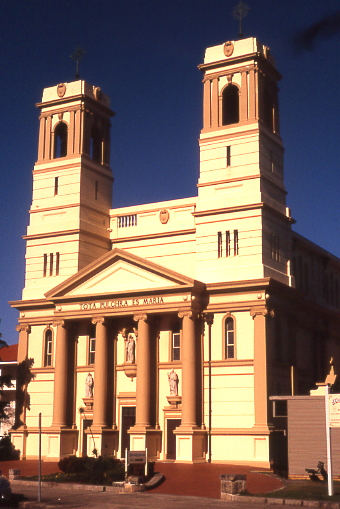
Mary Immaculate Church, Waverley, New South Wales (Federation Academic Classical)

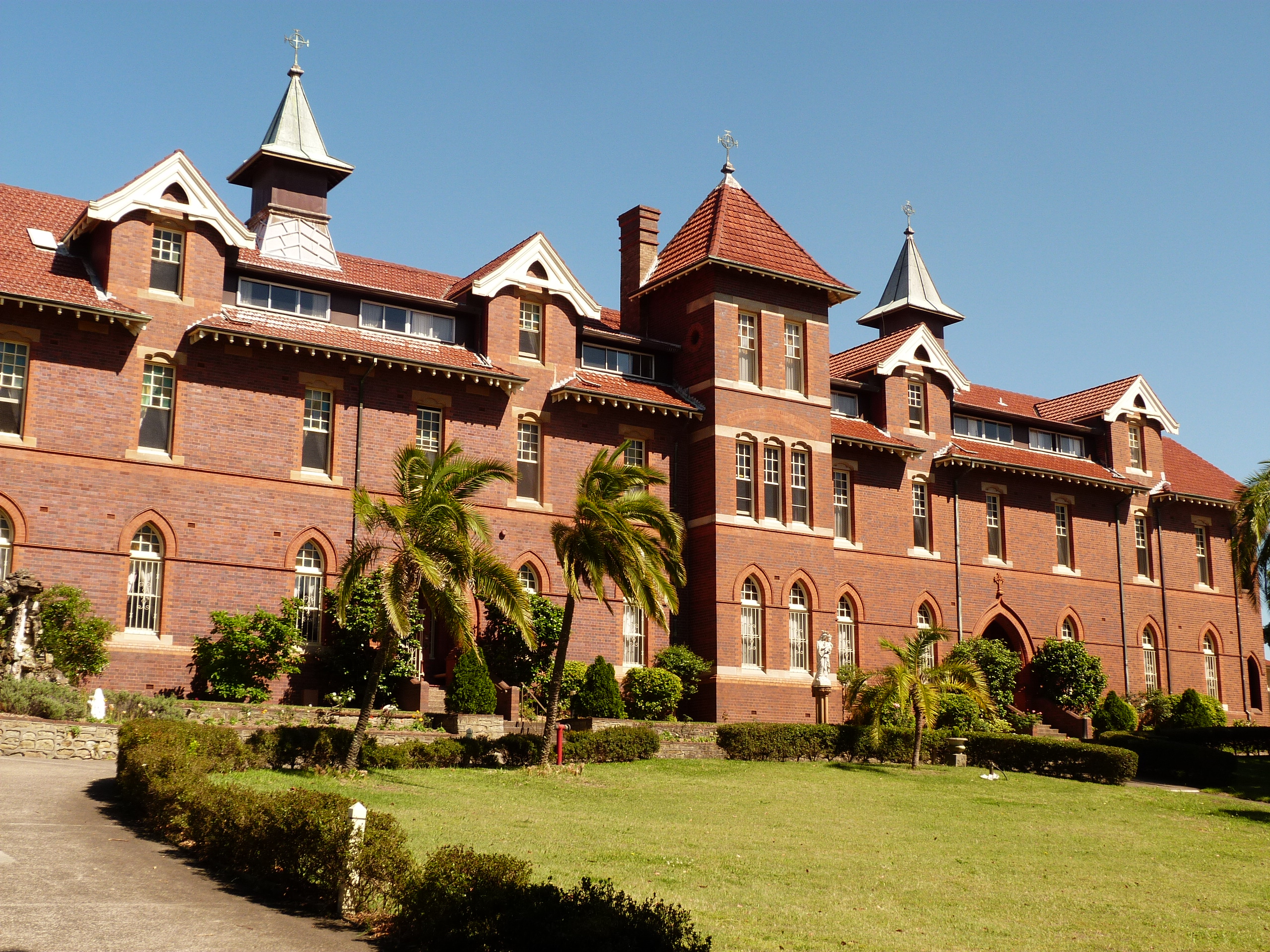
Our Lady of the Sacred Heart Convent, Kensington, New South Wales (Federation Gothic)

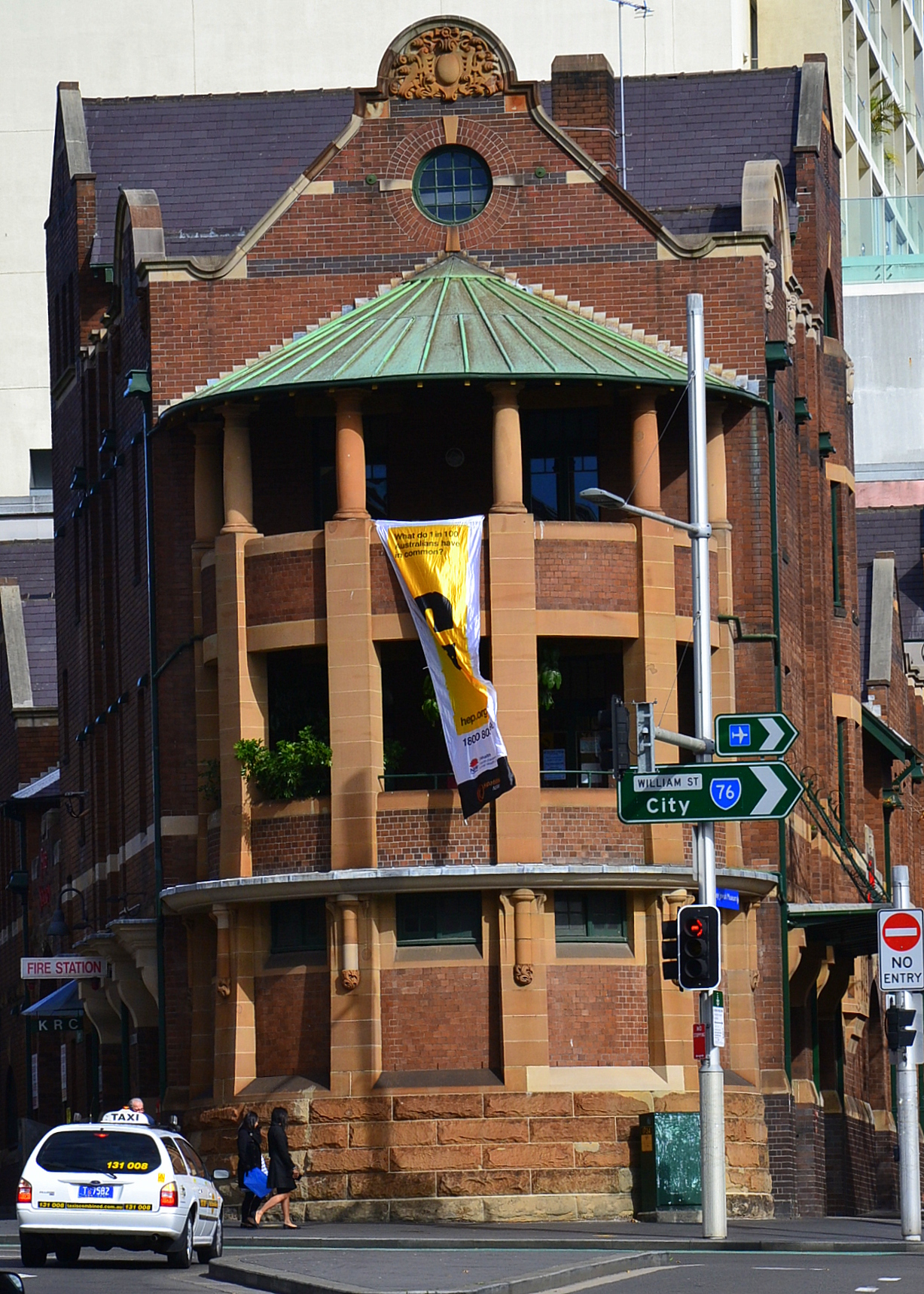
Fire Station, Darlinghurst, New South Wales (Federation Free Style, designed by Walter Liberty Vernon)

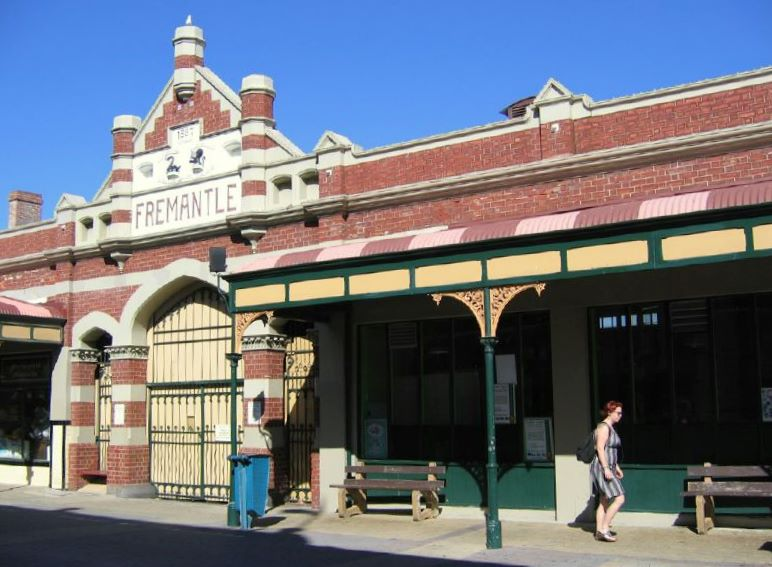
Fremantle Markets, Fremantle, Western Australia (Federation Romanesque)

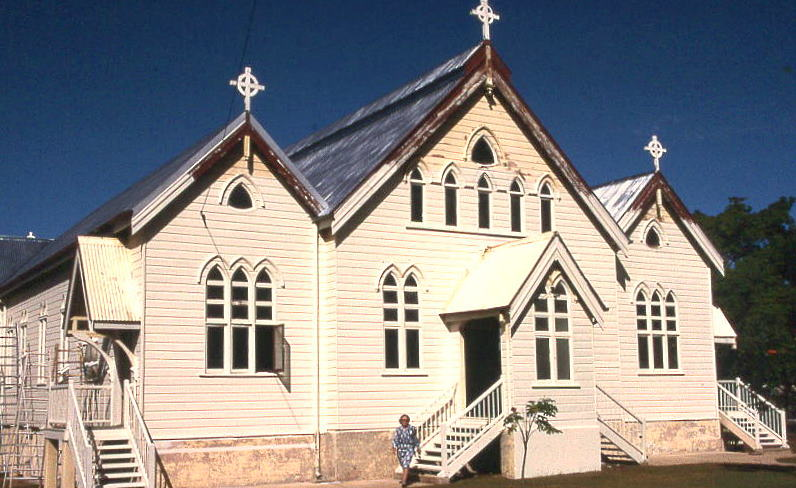
St. Mary's Church, Townsville, Queensland (Federation Carpenter Gothic)

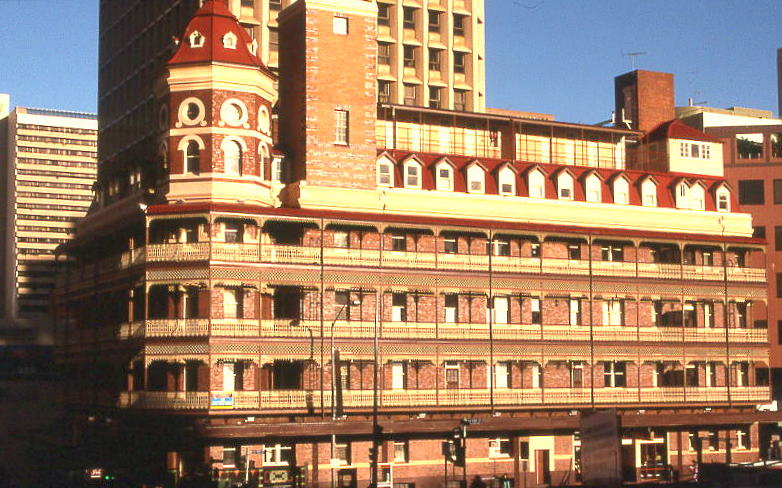
Salvation Army building, Brisbane, Queensland (Federation Filigree style)

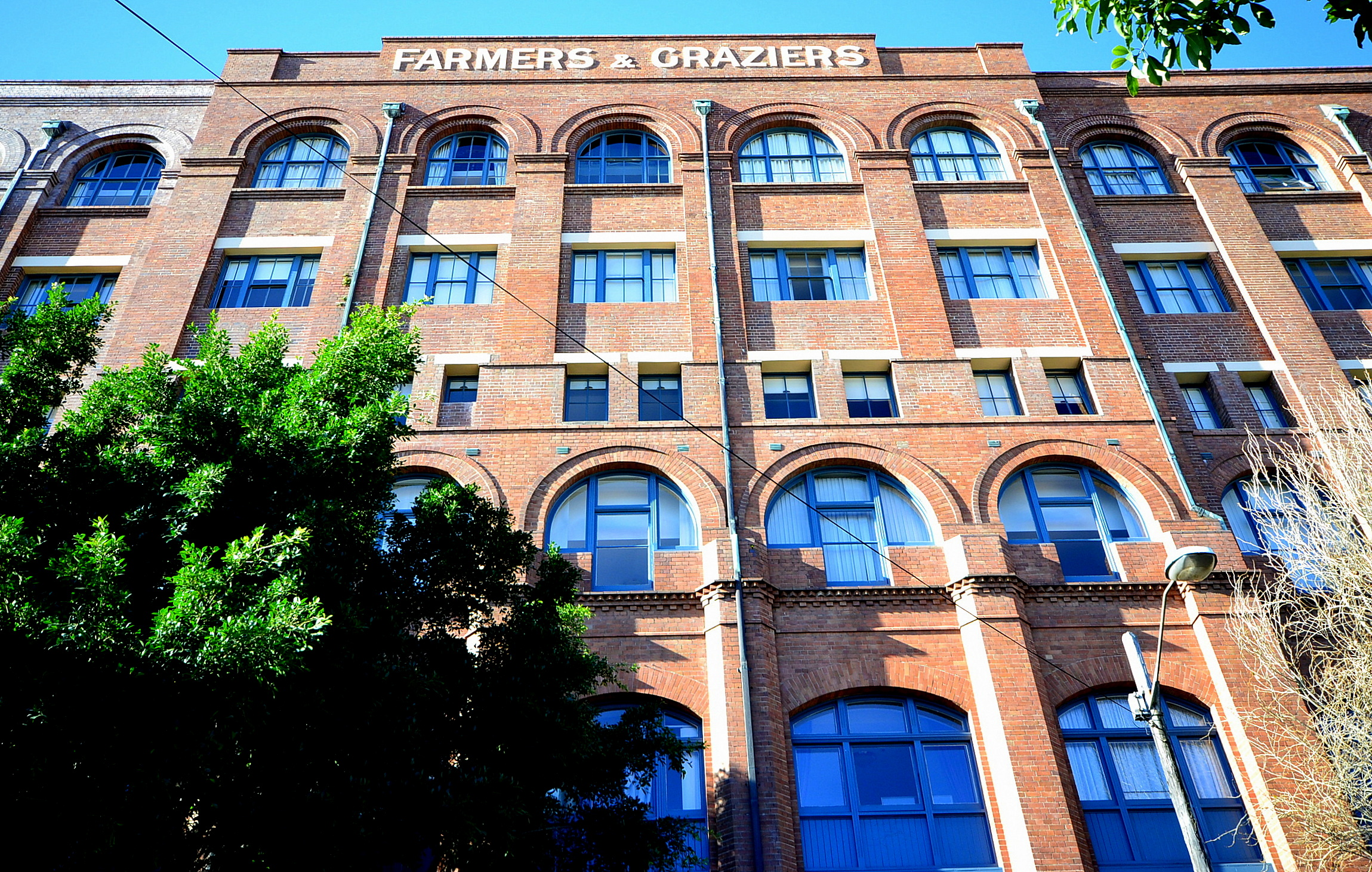
Former Farmers and Graziers Building, Ultimo, New South Wales (Federation Warehouse style)

== Federation architects ==
Notable Federation architects in Australia include:

- Rodney Alsop
- Harold Desbrowe Annear
- Albert Edmund Bates (Rockhampton, Queensland)
- Hillson Beasley
- A. L. Buchanan
- Henry Budden CBE
- Walter Butler
- Hugh Hamilton Campbell (Warwick, Queensland)
- Claude William Chambers (Qld)
- John James Clark
- Robin Dods
- George Thomas Eaton (Rockhampton, Queensland)
- Richard Gailey (Brisbane, Queensland)
- George Brockwell Gill (Ipswich, Queensland)
- Carlyle Greenwell
- William Hodgen (Toowoomba, Queensland)
- Sir Talbot Hobbs
- John Horbury Hunt
- Edward Jeaffreson Jackson (Sydney to 1908)
- Howard Joseland
- George Sydney Jones
- Henry Hardie Kemp
- Harry Marks (Toowoomba)
- George McRae
- Thomas Pollard Sampson
- Sir John Sulman
- George Temple-Poole
- Beverley Ussher
- Walter Liberty Vernon
- B. J. Waterhouse

== See also ==
- Australian architectural styles
- Australian residential architectural styles
- Australian non-residential architectural styles
- Appian Way, Burwood
- List of Australian historic homesteads
