= David and Mary May House =

Historic house in Ohio, United States

- U.S. National Register of Historic Places
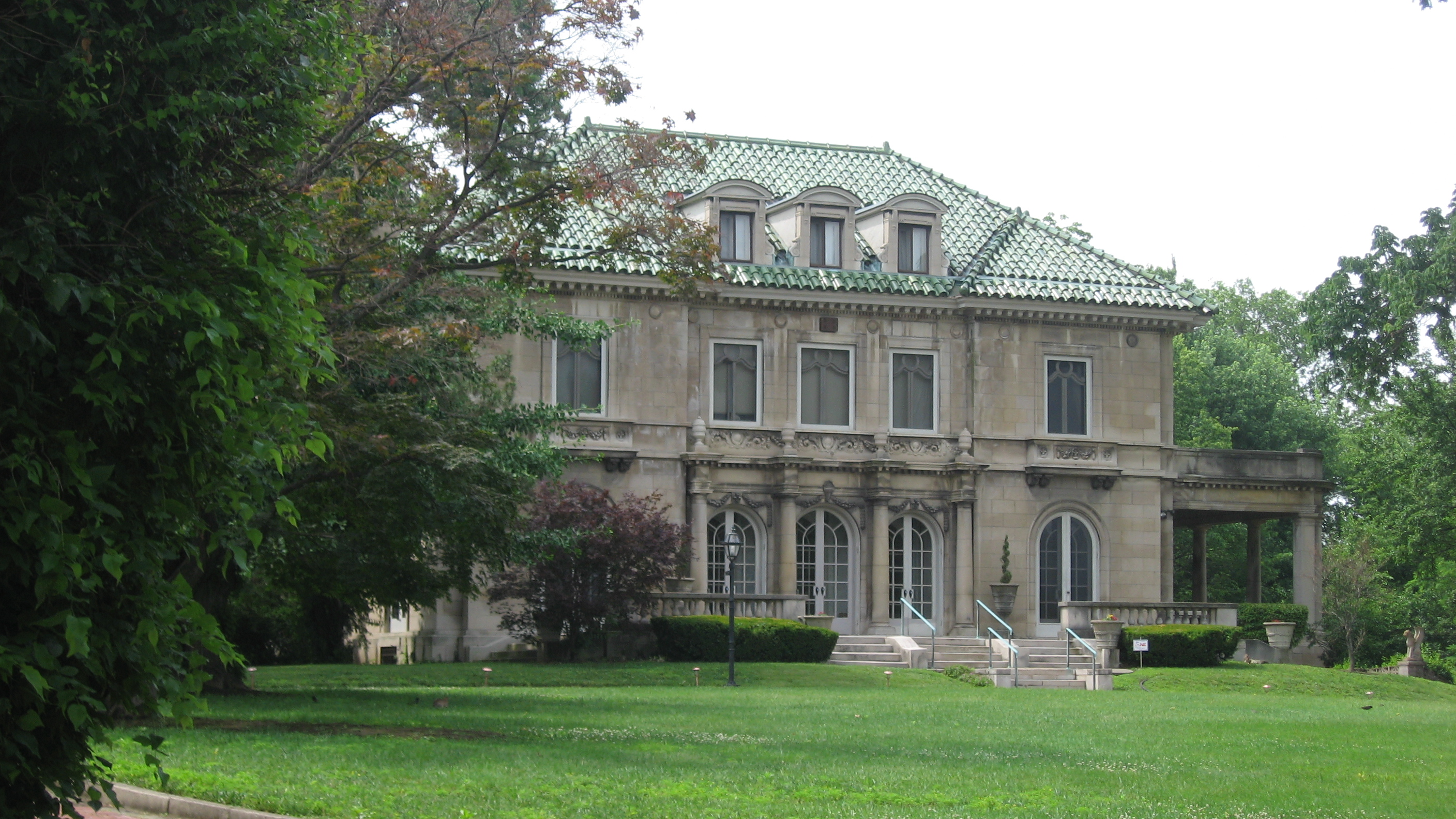
- Front of the house

- Location within Ohio Location within the United States
- Location: 3723 Washington Ave., Cincinnati, Ohio
- Coordinates: 39°9′9″N 84°29′41″W
- Built: 1910
- Architect: McMiller & Taft
- Architectural style: Italian Renaissance
- NRHP reference No.: 96000931
- Added to NRHP: August 22, 1996

The David and Mary May House is a historic residence in Cincinnati, Ohio, United States. Designed in the Italian Renaissance style of architecture, the house is a three-story structure constructed of Indiana limestone, although themes of French Renaissance architecture can also be seen in its design. The foundation is also stone, while the roof is covered with rows of terracotta tiles. Surrounded by trees, the house is covered by a hip roof that is pierced by multiple dormer windows. Some of the elements evoke a sense of the Beaux-Arts style, including the house's carefully designed symmetry, its decorative columns, urns, and swags, and the small wings on both sides of the central main portion of the house. Occupying a corner lot, the house is placed to face the corner; as such, its rear is substantially less formal than the street-facing front.

Since the 1930s, the 11-acre (4.5 ha) property has featured a brick driveway and a pillared gateway, decorated with an arch of wrought iron. Besides the house itself, the property consists of extensive gardens, including flowerbeds and a sunken garden, located together in the neighborhood of North Avondale.

In 1996, the May House was listed on the National Register of Historic Places, qualifying both because of its architecture and because of its place in local history. Besides the main house, an additional building and a related site were included in the historic designation. An early formal garden and a detached garage, complete with living space for the chauffeur, remain in existence behind the house itself.
