= Hugh Hamilton Campbell =

Australian architect

Hugh Hamilton Campbell (1856–1934) was an architect in Warwick, Queensland, Australia. Some of his works are now heritage-listed.

== Early life ==
Campbell was born in Thurso, Caithness, Scotland. His parents were stonemason John Campbell and his wife Margaret Hamilton.

== Architectural career ==
Campbell immigrated to Queensland in about 1876. He worked as a cabinet maker and contractor in Warwick and was inspector works for the Glengallan Division before offering his services as an architect around 1897. His son, Roderick Hamilton Campbell, joined him as partner in about 1909.

== Public life ==
Campbell served as an alderman in the Warwick Town Council.

== Later life ==
Campbell retired in about 1930. On 7 June 1934 he died at Sandgate of a heart attack. He was buried on Friday 8 June 1934 in Nundah Cemetery.

== Significant works ==
- 1910: Aberfoyle, a residence in Warwick, listed on the Queensland Heritage Register.
