= Mary May Scollen =

Sister of Mercy, nurse and hospital administrator

Mother Mary Justinian

Personal life
- Born: Mary May Scollen; 11 May 1887 Redfern, Sydney, New South Wales, Australia
- Died: 22 October 1967 (aged 80) Lane Cove, Sydney, New South Wales, Australia
- Home town: Redfern, Sydney, New South Wales, Australia
- Known for: nursing

Religious life
- Religion: Catholicism
- Order: Sisters of Mercy

Mary May Scollen (1887–1967), known by her religious name as Sister Mary Justinian, was an Australian religious who was notable for her nursing and hospital administration. She joined the North Sydney congregation of the Sisters of Mercy, professing final vows in 1907. Trained as a nurse, she served as matron of the Mater Misericordis Hospital in the north Sydney area, for 44 years. She then served as hospital administrator for four years, and concurrently was the superior for her convent. She was appointed M.B.E. in 1958.

== Early life ==
Mary May Scollen was born on 11 May 1887 in the town of Redfern, near Sydney, in New South Wales, Australia. Her parents, Patrick and Susan (née Smith) Scollen were both born in Ireland, and emigrated to Australia. Patrick Scollen was a laborer, and later a contractor. Mary May was the couple's second child. As a young woman, she attended Newtown Superior Public School.

== Religious life ==
In 1905, Mary May entered the novitiate at the Sisters of Mercy convent in North Sydney. The Sisters of Mercy were founded by an Irish Catholic lay woman, Catherine McAuley, in Dublin in 1827. The order was dedicated to education and care of the sick. The first Australian congregation of the Sisters of Mercy had been established in Western Australia in 1846, when Ursula Frayne led a group of sisters from Ireland to Fremantle. Elizabeth McQuoin, known by her religious name Mother Mary Ignatius, established a convent in Sydney's rocks district, in 1865, at the invitation of Sydney's Catholic Bishop John Bede Polding. By 1879, a convent was purchased in North Sydney, which became the mother house, where novices were trained. It was here that Mary May, known now by her religious name Sister Mary Justinian, entered the Sisters of Mercy order, professing her vows on 26 December 1907.

In 1906, the North Sydney Sisters of Mercy opened the Mater Misericordis Hospital on Willoughby Road, in the Sydney suburb of Crows Nest. The hospital was named after the order's hospital in Dublin, and was originally established for the care of women and children. A general hospital, open to all patients, was completed in 1914, and the original building became a private hospital, also under the management of the Sisters of Mercy. A major extension to the Mater Private Hospital was built in 1929. A maternity hospital was completed in 1940.

Scollen trained and served as a nurse at Mater, beginning in 1905. She passed the rigorous examinations for joining the Australasian Trained Nurses' Association in 1911. In 1919, she was appointed matron of the hospital, overseeing all nursing activities and training new nurses. Immediately, she was faced with the enormous challenge of leading the hospital's response to the Spanish influenza pandemic. A whole ward was set aside for treating patients, to reduce the risk of spreading the disease. They had 262 patients with influenza, and the vast majority survived, thanks to the excellent care they received.

In 1955, Scollen helped with the founding of the New South Wales College of Nursing.

On 1 January 1958, at the 1958 New Year Honours, she was appointed a member of the Order of the British Empire (M.B.E.) in recognition of her service to nursing.

In 1963, after 44 years of being the hospital matron, Scollen became the superior for the North Sydney convent and administrator of the Mater Misericordis Hospital. She served a four-year term, retiring in 1967 because of ill health.

== Death ==
She died on 22 October 1967, in the same hospital where she had been a key figure for so many years.

== See also ==
- Health care in Australia
- Nursing in Australia
- Sisters of Mercy
