= Allora Cemetery =

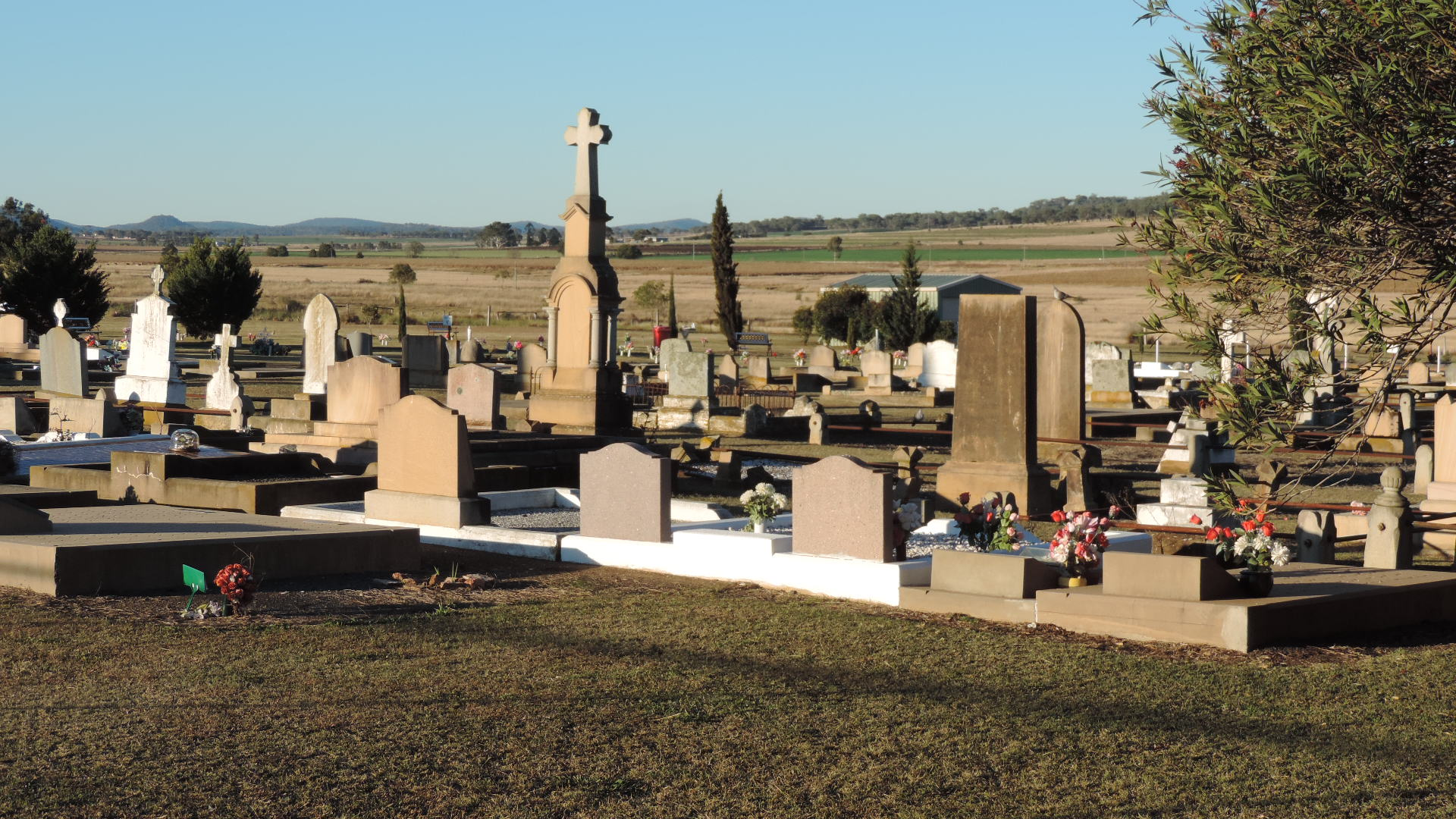
- Allora Cemetery, 2015

- Location within Queensland Location within Australia
- 28.0197°S 151.9773°E
- Location: Allora–Clifton Road, Allora, Southern Downs Region, Queensland, Australia

History
- Design period: 1840s–1860s (mid-19th century)
- Built: 1864

Queensland Heritage Register
- Official name: Allora Cemetery
- Type: state heritage (built)
- Designated: 27 April 2001
- Reference no.: 602153
- Significant period: 1864–ongoing (fabric, historical use)
- Significant components: tower – bell / belfry, grave surrounds/railings, toilet block/earth closet/water closet, headstone, columbarium, plaque, shed – tools, pathway/walkway, tree groups – avenue of, burial/grave, memorial/monument, memorial – pavilion, gate – entrance, grave marker, denominational divisions, road/roadway

Allora Cemetery is a heritage-listed cemetery on Allora-Clifton Road, Allora, Southern Downs Region, Queensland, Australia. It was established in 1864. It was added to the Queensland Heritage Register on 27 April 2001.

== History ==
Allora Cemetery on the Allora–Clifton Road is north west of Allora. While the cemetery was established in 1864, the oldest headstone dates from 1867. It has always been organised with denominational sections and includes monuments and memorials pertaining to those who lived in Allora and the surrounding district, including the William Mitchner Shelter-shed.

Allan Cunningham's exploration of the southern Darling Downs in 1827 first revealed the potential of the Darling Downs for pastoral and agricultural usage. In the 1840s pastoralists moved into the area and shepherds on Goomburra Run built huts at the base of Allora Mountain where it was easiest to cross the Dalrymple Creek. It became a popular camping place for teamsters on the Warwick–Drayton Road and was the beginning of Allora Township. The first inn was built in 1857 and the town was surveyed in 1859 with the first town land sales on 5 March 1860. During the 1860s as Allora became a service centre to the surrounding black soil farms the town acquired a police station, post office, national school, cemetery and courthouse.

In 1869 Allora was granted municipal status (Borough of Allora), but the railhead bypassed the town being established instead at Hendon. During the 1870s a flour mill, school of arts, saddlery and sawmill were opened. Allora continued to develop as the administration and service centre for the township and local wheat and dairy farmers.

The first burial in Allora Cemetery was that of John Rhinehart in 1864. The timber cross marking has grave has long since disappeared. Dr Sadjucis, a German, was the Allora doctor in the 1860s. He had a heart attack while on horseback at Spring Creek and was buried in Allora cemetery. However, the oldest extant headstone is that of Clifton Station manager Charles Henry Bullock, who was buried in the Church of England section in 1867.

An area of 16 acres (6.5 ha) 1 rood (11,000 sq ft; 1,000 m^{2}) 15 perches (380 m^{2}) was surveyed for a Cemetery Reserve at Allora in October 1879, but it was not gazetted until 1893. It seems that the Allora and Clifton councils managed the cemetery. The 1865 Cemeteries Act provided for the regulation of cemeteries throughout Queensland and required Trustees to make by-laws in accordance with the Act. However, it was not until July 1893 that public meetings were called to discuss electing of Cemetery Trustees so as to bring the local cemetery under this Act. The initial Trustees where Thomas Kennedy, James Dougall, William Deacon, James Dean, Patrick Kelley, Robert Cooke and Joseph Nemeth. The Allora Cemetery Reserve with seven Trustees was gazetted on 23 September 1893.

In line with government policy, the Allora Cemetery Trustees requested in February 1915 that the cemetery be placed under the control and management of the Allora Shire Council. This occurred on 13 March 1915. Since the amalgamation of local government areas in 1994 the Warwick Shire Council manages the cemetery and following further amalgamations in 2008, the Southern Downs Regional Council manages the cemetery.

The most prominent memorial, a convenience for the first stage of a burial ceremony and a retreat from the weather, was erected during 1925–26. It is the rectangular brick William Mitchner Shelter-shed located near the front gate and beside the central pathway. German born William Mitchner of Allora died in Toowoomba on 1 June 1918. Under his will £800 was to be used for the erection of a shelter-shed that included a sarcophagus, bust of himself and belfry. The bell was to be tolled whenever a funeral was approaching. His will directed that this shelter-shed be similar to but smaller and less expensive than the brick shelter-shed to be constructed at the Warwick General Cemetery. Also the amount of £150 was to be invested by the Allora General Cemetery trustees to provide income for the shelter-shed's maintenance for 50 years.

William Mitchner, born on 2 August 1841 in Germany, arrived in Allora about 1872 where he gained employment as a fireman or engineer in fellow German Francis Kates' flourmill. Later he was a storekeeper in the shop that was replaced by the Commercial Hotel. He acquired interests in Allora, Warwick and Toowoomba and his death certificate gave his occupation as an investor. His inventory for probate revealed an estate of over $30,000. Mitchner left bequests to both the Warwick and Toowoomba hospitals, money for the Anglican and Catholic churches in both Warwick and Allora and money for the erection of an Anglican church in Hendon. For various reasons no Anglican Church was erected at Hendon and in the 1990s the invested money totaling over $50,000 was given to Allora's St Davids Anglican Church to assist with its maintenance.

Allora Shire Council called a public meeting for 28 February 1920 to discuss accepting the Mitchner cemetery bequest, as the Council felt it was not appropriate; probably because of Australian involvement in World War I. At the meeting some felt that they should refuse the bequest; however, it was suggested a shelter-shed would be a useful convenience. The meeting agreed to ask the Mitchner Trustees to pay for calling tenders, preparing plans and specifications and then the calling another public meeting.

Mitchner also left money to his family and hometown in Germany. As Australia was at war with Germany in 1918 legal problems arose from this bequest. The distribution of his estate went to the Full Court in Brisbane in 1921 and on appeal to the High Court of Australia in 1922. The Full Court ruled that the bequest to the Warwick Cemetery Trustees was valid but with the Allora Cemetery wanting to modify the design, as the amount was insufficient, the court felt this needed further examination. Perhaps these legal issues and cost of erecting the memorial explain why the Mitchner Shelter-shed was not put out to tender until 1925.

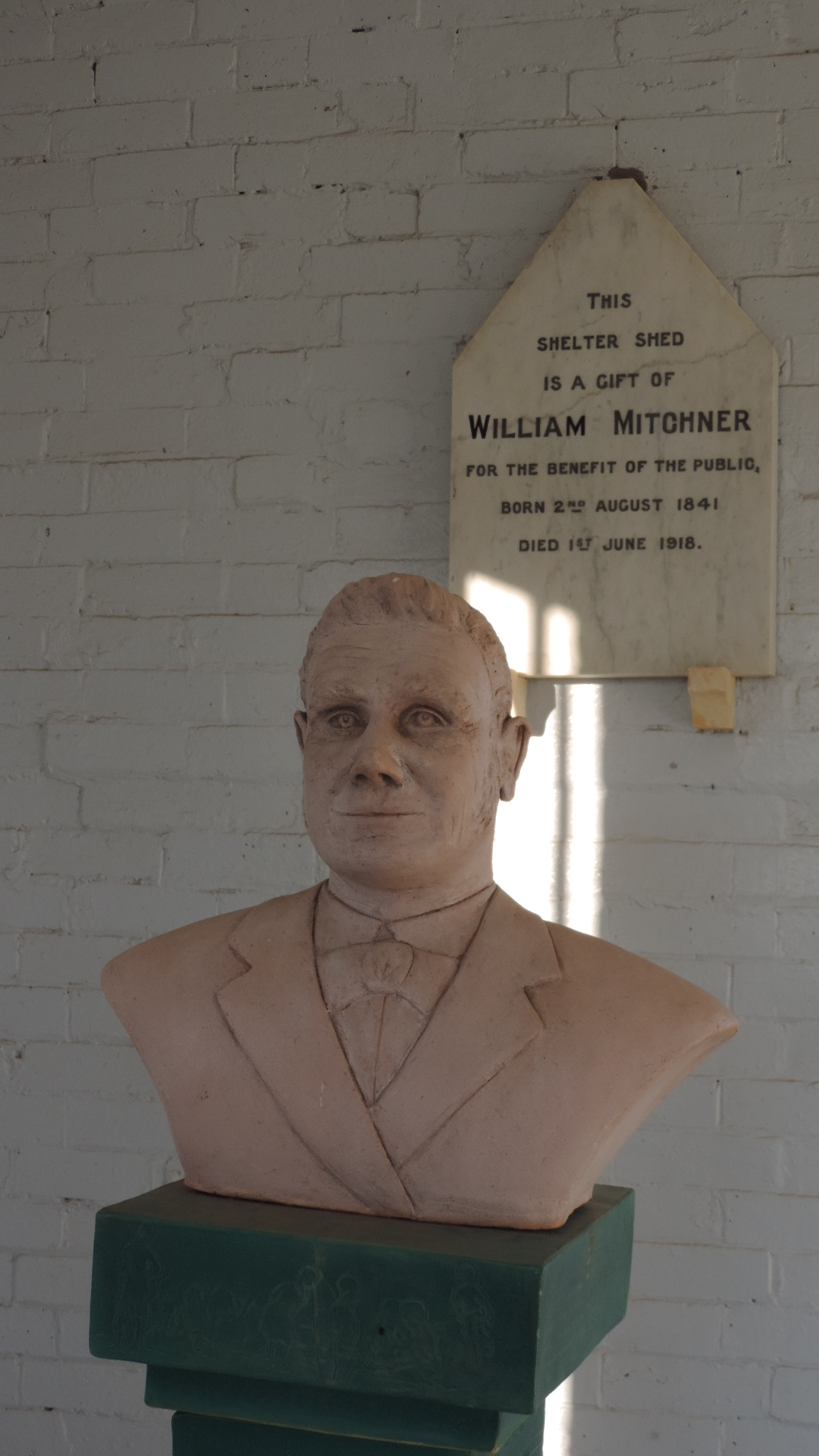
Bust of William Mitchner within the shelter, 2015

On 3 October 1925 the Allora Shire Council Cemetery Trust called tenders for a brick and concrete shelter-shed for the Allora Cemetery, to comply with the William Mitchner bequest. Plans and specifications were available from the shire office and tenders closed 17 October 1925. By May 1926 the Cemetery Committee had agreed to a tender for the bell in connection with the Mitchner bequest and the Warwick Cemetery Trustees had agreed to share the cost of a clay model for the bust. However, it is thought that Charles Astley created the Allora Mitchner bust and Petries Stonemasons were involved with the Warwick sculpture. The bell no longer tolls.

While it is usual for the family of the deceased to pay for the memorial this is not always the case. Alexander Cameron (1840–1882) was the first Allora Municipal Council clerk from 1860 to his death and in appreciation his fellow townsmen erected a small obelisk over his grave. His family plot also includes a small tablet in memory of his wife who died in 1944. Rev James Boyd Morrow (1856–1893) was the Allora Presbyterian Minister from 1888 to shortly before his death in Brisbane. A cortege of 50 buggies and 200 horsemen met the train at Hendon to escort the coffin back to Allora and his parishioners later erected an 18-foot (5.5 m) high obelisk on a massive pedestal.

Irish born Samuel Gordon (1822–1902) became a Goomburra Station shepherd in 1858 and for a few years lived in a hut where Allora now stands. Gordon purchased the Drayton and Raff Streets corner in the first Allora town land sale. In 1864 he built Allora's second hotel, the Princess of Wales. Gordon's tombstone includes names of children, several of whom died before they were six years of age. Australian Joint Stock Bank manager Travers Robert Goff was only 43 when he died in 1907; his eldest daughter Helen Lyndon, writing under the pseudonym Pamela Lyndon Travers, created the fictional character Mary Poppins.

Allora Cemetery includes memorials for townsmen and the people of the surrounding district including pastoralist George John Edwin Clark (1834–1907). He and his brother Charles purchased Old Talgai Station in 1868 and it became well known for high-grade merino wool. In 1876 George helped establish the Warwick Examiner and Times and was the Warwick member of the Queensland Legislative Assembly 1867–8. Brought up an Anglican he became a priest of the Catholic Apostolic (Irvingite) Church with a private chapel at Talgai. His son George Carr Clark (1864–1942) remained at Talgai until 1910 and is also buried in this rural cemetery. An early pioneer was William Naish (1838–1918) who worked as a shearer and fencer on Talgai Station where he found the Talgai Skull in 1886.

Edward Anderson (1822–1908) was one of the first Allora aldermen and mayor in 1870 and he was also responsible for many of the early buildings. Irish born Henry Ludgate (1840–1929) emigrated and joined the Queensland Police in 1865 and was transferred to Allora in 1874. Although he had several transfers his family stayed in Allora and after his retirement he served as an alderman from 1900 to 1913.

Many of the early pioneers still have descendants in the district. James Gwynne (1815–1875) and his wife Rhoda (1828–1912) arrived in Allora in 1862. Mrs Gwynne opened the first school and together they opened the first Allora Post Office. Publican John Holmes (1837–1901) was established in Allora by 1862 and was licensee of the Dalrymple, Crown and Royal Hotel at various times and some of his family still have business interests in Allora. William Deacon (1839–1927) and his wife Anne arrived in Allora in 1867 where he became the first Allora State School teacher. Mrs Deacon was active in Methodist Church affairs and wrote under the pen name of Patience Brown while William is better remembered as a successful businessman who served 39 years on the local Council. Bookkeeper George Shooter (1861–1942) and his wife Leila (1869–1955) worked on various stations before moving to the district as share farmers. Descendants still farm on part of what was Talgai West.

Mortality rates for children used to be very high, and like all cemeteries there are graves for the very young. Many are small plots and often have small tombstones like that of 9 month old Mary Ann Holmes who died 9 February 1867 and 15 month old Mabel Hancock who died 30 November 1887.

Some graves do not have headstones including those of Queen Charlotte and Kitty Kitty. It is believed that these were the last local Aboriginals and they were buried in the southeastern corner of the cemetery.

The cemetery contains two Commonwealth war graves, of a Captain and a Private of the Australian Army who died serving in World War II.

Allora Cemetery includes a columbarium and lawn cemetery. Mark Brelsford was buried in the latter in 1996. Brelsford, a plumber by trade, collected historical information and using pen and ink sketched many of the districts heritage places and he was responsible for two books Land of the Leslies and Sandstone and cedar.

== Description ==
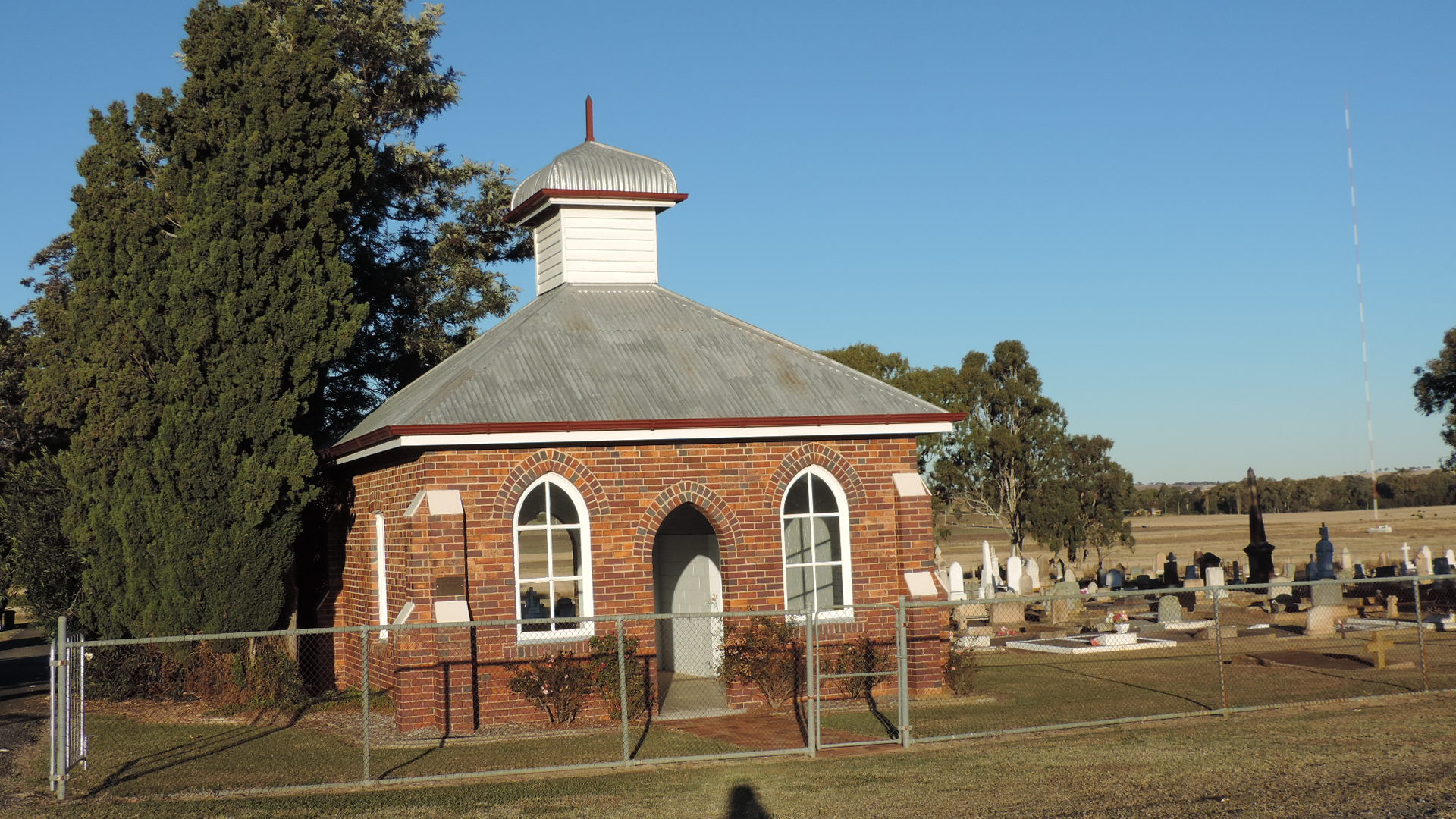
William Mitchner Shelter-shed, 2015

Farms surround Allora Cemetery which is just over 3 kilometres (1.9 mi) northwest of Allora. Pepperinas along the Allora-Clayton Road cyclone wire fence define the western boundary, as does a wet weather creek on the southern side.

This cemetery has the usual grid of roads and paths with signposts delineating each denominational section of the monumental burial ground. A central driveway is lined by evergreen cypress like trees and at the northern end a road separates the lawn cemetery from the Methodist and Catholic monumental sections. There is a brick columbarium near this entrance.

Facing the road and beside the central entrance is the largest memorial, the Mitchner Shelter-shed. A pedestrian gate and concrete path leads to this structure which is 5 metres (16 ft) square with 215-millimetre (8.5 in) solid brick walls of Garden Flemish bond that are approximately 3 metres (9.8 ft) high. The corrugated iron roof rises to a square timber steeple capped by a domed mushroom and finial.

The main entrance, which faces west towards the road, has a central arched entrance separating a pair of arched glazed openings. The rear eastern wall also has a gothic arched opening. The northern and southern walls each have an off-centre rectangular double hung sash window. The exterior walls with pairs of corner buttresses are not painted except for the buttresses oblique planes.

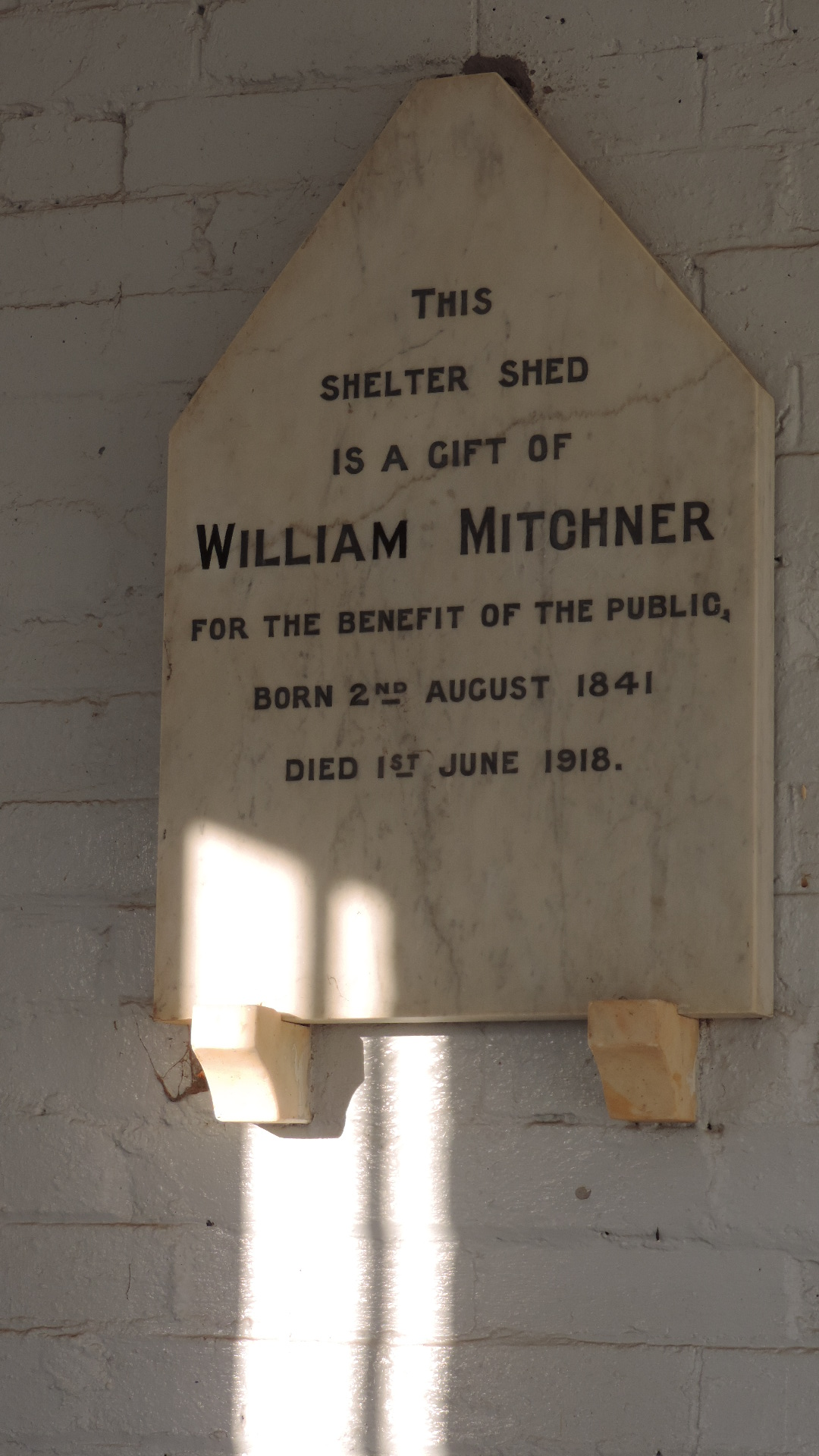
Plaque about William Mitchner within the shelter, 2015

The internal rear wall has a marble plaque stating that William Mitchner gave the shelter as a gift for the benefit of the public and that he was born 2 August 1841 and died 1 June 1918. The interior brickwork is painted. The concrete floor has been treated with terrazzo and the ceiling is fibro. The structure is hollow except for the blockwork walled toilet.

To the north and slightly further down the central roadway is a gravediggers shelter. It has a corrugated iron hip roof supported by timber posts and includes a small lockable shed.

Inscriptions on memorials reveal that many of the early settlers came from England, Scotland, Ireland and a few from Wales and Germany and other European countries. There are monuments and family grave plots pertaining to pioneers, immigrants and locally born, ministers, bank managers, teachers, publicans, builders, farmers and benefactors to the community.

Gravestones vary from simple upright tablets to more elaborate late Victorian types. There are obelisks, Celtic and Calvary crosses, urn-topped columns and horizontal slabs with tablets. There are single and family plots; while a few have cast-iron picket fencing, many have concrete kerbing. Some are the work of Warwick monumental masons like James McCulloch and others were transported from afar.

The cemetery grounds are well maintained although some monuments show deterioration and others have collapsed.

== Heritage listing ==
Allora Cemetery was listed on the Queensland Heritage Register on 27 April 2001 having satisfied the following criteria.

The place is important in demonstrating the evolution or pattern of Queensland's history.

Allora Cemetery is important in demonstrating the evolution of Queensland history in that it provides evidence of the occupations, social status and demography of the Warwick district, particularly displaying the diversity since the 1860s of the town's cultural, religious and ethnic groups.

The place is important in demonstrating the principal characteristics of a particular class of cultural places.

Allora Cemetery survives as a good example of its type, with a variety of headstones and monuments illustrating changing public attitudes to commemoration of the dead. While monuments and headstones vary in size, quality and condition they reflect the social, religious and architectural history of Allora from the 1860s to the 21st century.

The place is important because of its aesthetic significance.

The form and design of the shelter-shed exhibits aesthetic characteristics valued by the community as do the diversity of headstones, grid layout with a central avenue of evergreen trees and layout of paths.

The place has a strong or special association with a particular community or cultural group for social, cultural or spiritual reasons.

The masonry Mitchner Shelter-shed was a given to the community by William Mitchner for the benefit of the community as a roofed rest area for use during interments, when visiting, refuge from the weather and as a meeting place. It has a special association with the Allora community for social, cultural and spiritual reasons.

The place has a special association with the life or work of a particular person, group or organisation of importance in Queensland's history.

The place has a special association with several notable individuals and families who have contributed to the historical evolution of Allora and district and to the mythology associated with pastoral and pioneering life.
