= Warwick General Cemetery =

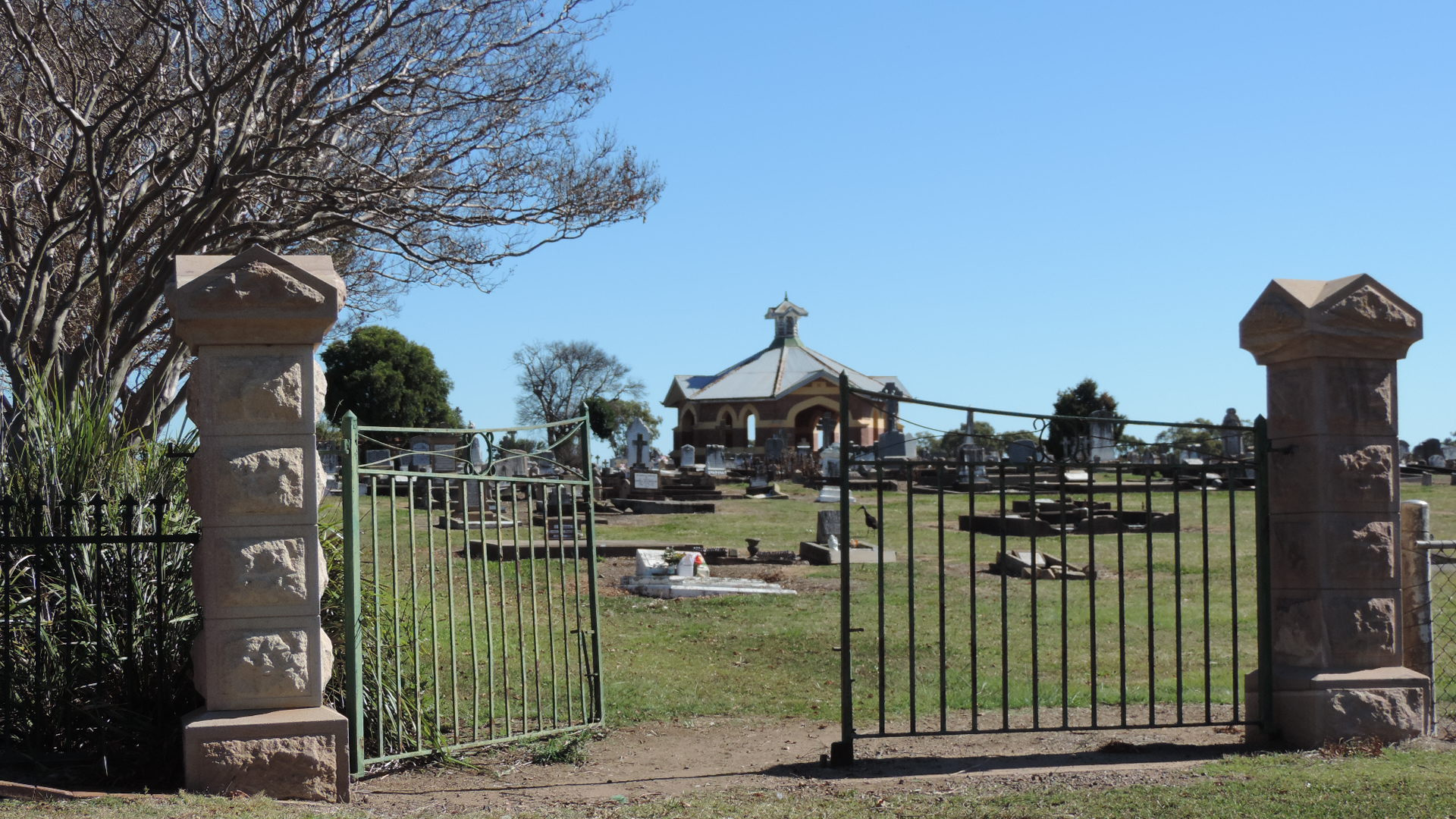
- Warwick General Cemetery, 2015

- Location within Queensland Location within Australia
- 28.2099°S 152.0032°E
- Location: Wentworth Street, Warwick, Southern Downs Region, Queensland, Australia

History
- Design period: 1840s–1860s (mid-19th century)
- Built: 1853–

Site notes
- Architect: Dornbusch & Connolly
- Architectural style: Gothic

Queensland Heritage Register
- Official name: Warwick General Cemetery
- Type: state heritage (built)
- Designated: 27 April 2001
- Reference no.: 602152
- Significant period: 1853– ongoing (fabric, historical use)
- Significant components: memorial/monument, pathway/walkway, crypt / vault, shed – shelter, headstone, gate – entrance, grave marker, denominational divisions, road/roadway, burial/grave, tower – bell / belfry, seating, memorial – pavilion, sculpture, plaque, columbarium, grave surrounds/railings
- Builders: Phil Thornton

Warwick General Cemetery is a heritage-listed cemetery at Wentworth Street, Warwick, Southern Downs Region, Queensland, Australia. It was designed by Dornbusch & Connolly and built from 1853 onwards by Phil Thornton. It was added to the Queensland Heritage Register on 27 April 2001.

== History ==
The first section of the Warwick General Cemetery was surveyed in 1850, when the town of Warwick was officially laid out, and the earliest burial is understood to have been in 1853. Warwick General Cemetery is located to the west of the Warwick central business district, on an elevated area near a bend in the Condamine River. While the size of the cemetery has changed it has always been organised with denominational sections and includes monuments and memorials pertaining to those who lived in Warwick and the surrounding district, including the prominently situated William Mitchner Shelter-shed.

Allan Cunningham's exploration of the southern Darling Downs in 1827 first revealed the potential of the Darling Downs for pastoral and agricultural usage. In the 1840s pastoralists moved into the area, and in the late 1840s the township of Warwick was established by the NSW colonial government as an administrative and service centre for the surrounding pastoral district. An initial survey of the town was undertaken in 1849, with further survey in 1850. The latter included 8 acres reserved as general cemetery, to the northwest of the township. The first sale of Warwick town lots took place in July 1850.

While deaths and burials occurred in the region and there are early graves on pastoral properties, the first known burial in the Warwick General Cemetery was that of Thomas Howard in 1853. On 23 February 1864 a Deed of Grant was issued to three trustees for 2 acres of land for sole use as by the Church of England. It does not seem that the other denominations acquired such a document. Subsequently, an area to the west and north to the Condamine River of the burial grounds became a reserve for extension of the general cemetery.

Management of this cemetery has often been controversial. A visitor to the region complained in 1859 that the cemetery needed a pig-proof fence. Complaints about the cemetery continued with comments about locals using it for their dairy cows being raised by an alderman in Council in late March 1867. The 1865 Cemeteries Act provided for the regulation of cemeteries throughout Queensland and required Trustees to make by-laws in accordance with the Act. After public meetings in January 1868 the names of five denominational Warwick General Cemetery trustees were gazetted in June 1868. The Trustees formulated regulations and charges. Prior to this no cemetery records existed, however, cemetery transcriptions revealed 11 burials in the Methodist section, 5 in the Presbyterian, 19 in the Catholic and 25 in the Anglican section, pre-1868.

In 1898 the Trustees believed that more land for burial purposes was required. As the area reserved for extension included low-lying land liable to flood from the Condamine River they asked for Portions 328 and 333 to the south of a road and the road adjoining the cemetery to be added as it would allow extension of the Church of England and Roman Catholic sections. Warwick Cemetery Reserve was gazetted on 10 June 1899; it included the additional land. However it was not until 25 March 1908 that the Queensland Governor signed a Deed of Grant in Trust that named five Trustees for a Cemetery Reserve of 56½ acres.

The Trustees' income was derived from sale of gravesites, interments and donations and they had to pay the sexton's salary and maintenance costs. They were conservative with expenditure – for example not fencing the additional land until overcrowding warranted this in 1903. However, in 1911 the cemetery Trustees used 500 pegs of recent design manufactured locally by R Reyburn Warwick Foundry to replace wooden grave pegs. By 1917 prickly pear became a major problem for the Trustees. To assist with its eradication they sought permission, unsuccessfully, for selling off about 26 acres.

In January 1914 the Cemetery Trustees proposed erecting a cemetery rest-house. Local architects Dornbusch and Connolly had prepared plans and specifications and had estimated the cost of the timber structure with red asbestos roof tiles at £100. The core was to be 12 feet (3.7 m) wide with 6-foot (1.8 m) arms stretching out on the four compass corners, and was to be located where two pathways intersected at right angles. An earlier scheme was for a shelter to stand near the centre, on an intersection where the principal roadways intersected. The structure would "harmonise with the foliage of the trees". While the community obviously felt the need, a shelter-shed was not erected until a bequest from William Mitchner enabled its construction.

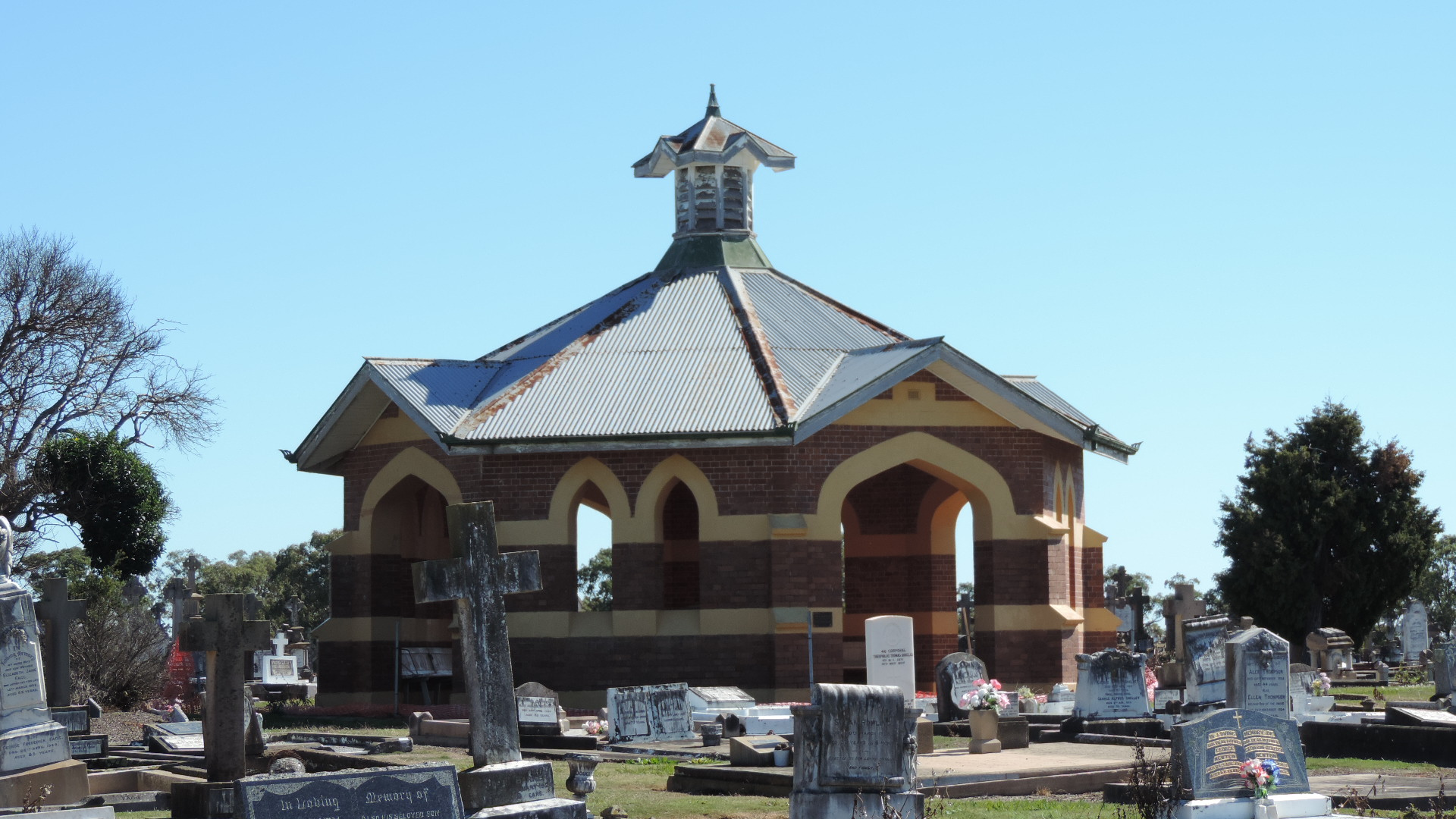
William Mitchner shelter, 2015

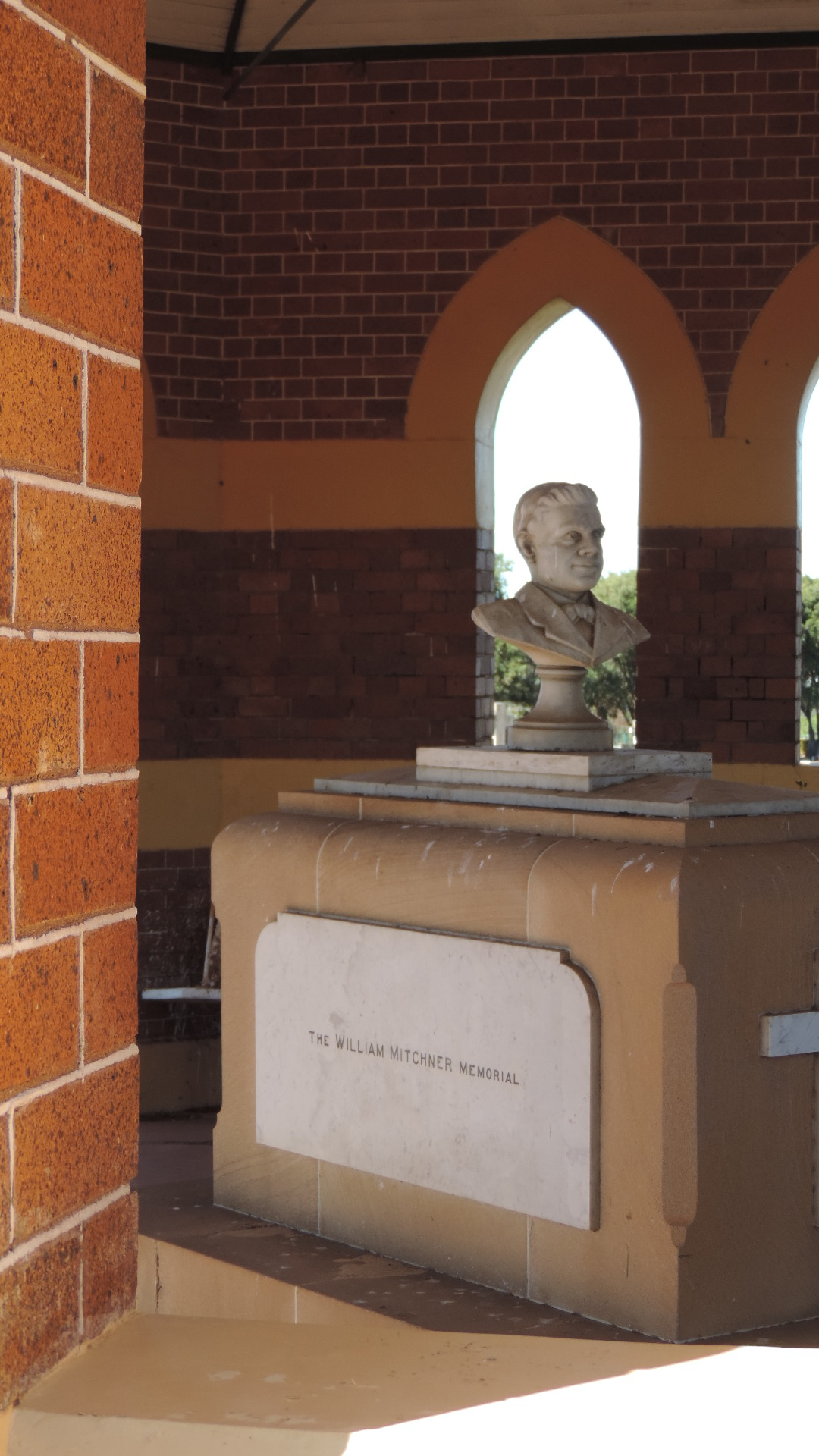
Vault and bust of William Mitchner in the shelter, 2015

A dominant landmark, erected in 1926, the octagonal William Mitchner Shelter-shed is a single-storey, brick and tin building situated in the middle of the Warwick General Cemetery. German born William Mitchner of Allora died in Toowoomba on 1 June 1918. Under his will, £1,500 was to be used to erect a memorial shelter-shed. He left explicit instructions in his will, including that it was to be built of brick and was "to contain in the left hand wing thereof a marble monument with an emblem of a simple marble cross resting thereon, the said monument to be surrounded with iron railings and to be inscribed as follows: – 'This Shelter-shed is the gift of William Mitchner for the benefit of the Public'" and the date of his birth and death. The shelter shed was to include a vault for his body and on or near this a plaster bust of himself. To enhance the structure he wanted an appropriate steeple, bell and belfry. The vault and bust were to cost £150 and bell could cost between £150 and £200. The Cemetery Trustees were to invest £200 and use the income for the maintenance of the shelter and bust. The bell was to be tolled whenever a funeral was approaching. He also set aside £800 for a smaller shelter shed at the Allora Cemetery.

William Mitchner, born on 2 August 1841 in Germany, arrived in Allora about 1872 where he gained employment as a fireman or engineer in fellow German Francis Kates' flourmill. Later he was a storekeeper in the shop that was replaced by the Commercial Hotel. He acquired interests in Allora, Warwick and Toowoomba and his death certificate gave his occupation as an investor. His inventory for probate revealed an estate of over $30,000. Mitchner left bequests to both the Warwick and Toowoomba hospitals, money for the Anglican and Catholic churches in both Warwick and Allora and money for the erection of an Anglican church in Hendon.

He also left money to his relatives and hometown in Germany. As Australia was at war with Germany in 1918 legal problems arose from this bequest. The distribution of his estate went to the Full Court in Brisbane in 1921 and on appeal to the High Court of Australia in 1922. Perhaps these legal issues explain why the memorial shelter shed was not put out to tender until 1926.

Established Warwick architects Dornbusch and Connolly, who accepted the tender of Phil Thornton for £1,236 in February 1926, designed the William Mitchner Shelter-shed. This octangular brick and cement structure was designed with a bell tower and seating accommodation inside. It did not have the wing's detailed in Mitchner's will but the shelter-shed does include a vault with marble crosses at either end and marble plaque giving his details but no iron railing. In 1926 the Warwick and Allora Cemetery Trustees agreed to share the cost of a clay model for the bust. However, it is thought that Charles Astley created the Allora Mitchner bust and Petrie's Stonemasons were involved with the Warwick sculpture.

As the Cemetery Trustees died, moved out of the district, or resigned, the pertinent religious denomination appointed their replacements, although these appointments were not always gazetted. By September 1936 there were only two gazetted Trustees even though Churches had nominated new appointees. Meanwhile, there had been no Trustee meeting since 24 December 1933 and the Warwick City Council had been looking after the cemetery. While it was government policy to vest Cemetery Reserves in local councils, the Trustees were keen to retain their positions believing that as volunteers they saved taxpayers money especially as the cemetery was in the Shire of Rosenthal and not within the Warwick City boundaries.

Warwick City Council complained in February 1938 to the Lands Department about the cemetery's condition. A memo from the Toowoomba Land Office to Brisbane commented that the Cemetery Reserve comprised 52? acres including the original 8 acres. The Trustees had recently surveyed 5 new sections with spaces for 500 graves marked off in good order and proper alignment. The southern boundary fence, along Lancaster Street, was renewed and a painted sawn picket fence with suitable gates was erected along the eastern boundary, Wentworth Street, and the northern and western boundaries were adequately fenced. A properly formed gravelled roadway lead from the main entrance and most paths were well maintained although some were much overgrown with grass. The shelter shed containing the remains of William Mitchner in a vault was being repaired and painted at the time of inspection.

It was in 1938 that the Warwick City Council proposed the construction of a sewerage treatment works in the northern section of the cemetery. The Council sought Lands permission to divide the cemetery into two land parcels, with the southern part for Cemetery purposes and the northern for its Sewerage Treatment Works. For various controversial reasons, it was not until late 1940 that legislation was passed that vested Warwick City Council as the new Trustees of the cemetery. The Council's sewerage works were completed during the 1940s.

In April 1946, the Warwick City Council and Imperial (later Commonwealth) War Graves Commission officially established the Warwick War Graves Cemetery; that section of the cemetery then containing 22 graves. A pilgrimage to the war cemetery was held on Anzac Day that year. In July 1947, the local R.S.S.A.I.L.A. proposed to establish an area adjacent to the war cemetery for the burial of returned servicemen. Their request was approved in August 1947. The Commonwealth War Graves Commission records Warwick General Cemetery as containing three Australian services war graves (in different parts of the cemetery) from the First World War and 25 from the Second, the majority (21) of the latter being buried in Rows A and B of Plot A.

Council set aside a section of land for a columbarium in 1964. However, the first interment was not until 1972.

In the early 1970s the Warwick City Council established a council depot for machinery and road making materials on part of the northern cemetery reserve, between the cemetery and the sewerage works. By 1974 the Cemetery Reserve was being used for three functions: that of Cemetery, Works Depot and Sewerage Treatment Works. Because it was necessary to gazette the three different uses of this reserve the Deed of Grant upon Trust for the Cemetery was surrendered in 1976 so that Lands could re-survey the land, dedicate roads and issue new Deeds of Grant.

Gazettal of the Warwick Shire Council as Trustees of the three reserves did not occur until 16 May 1997. At this time the former cemetery reserve bounded by the Condamine River in the north, Wentworth Street, Lancaster Street, Taylor Street and Lots 325 and 326 became a reserve for sewerage, a council depot and a reserve for cemeteries, crematoriums and mortuaries. The cemetery was reduced to an area of 13.63 HA (30 acres) and is separated from the depot by a road. While it is still located to the west of the CBD, it no longer includes the low-lying area adjoining a bend in the Condamine River as that area is used for other local government purposes.

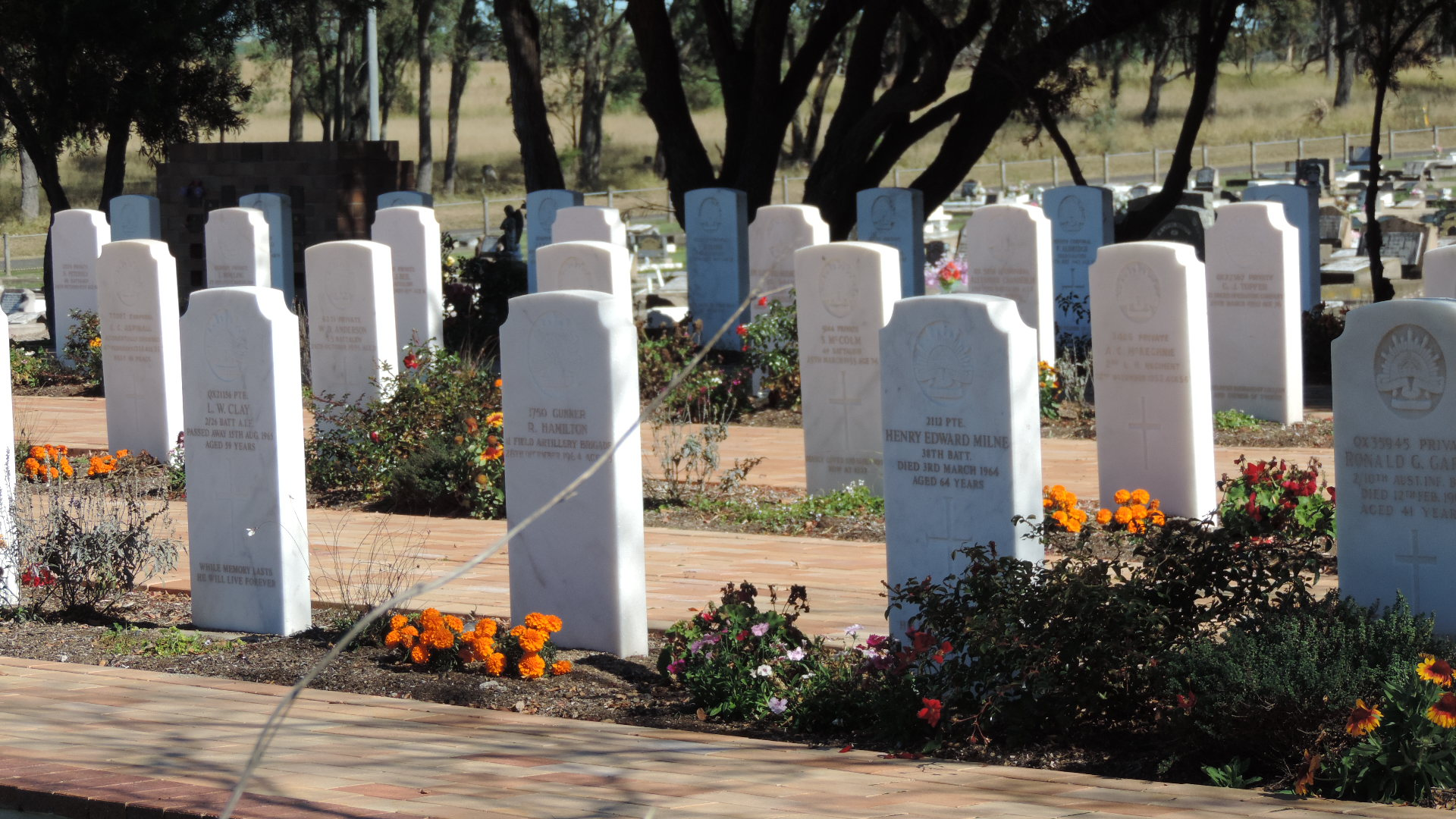
War cemetery within Warwick General Cemetery, 2015

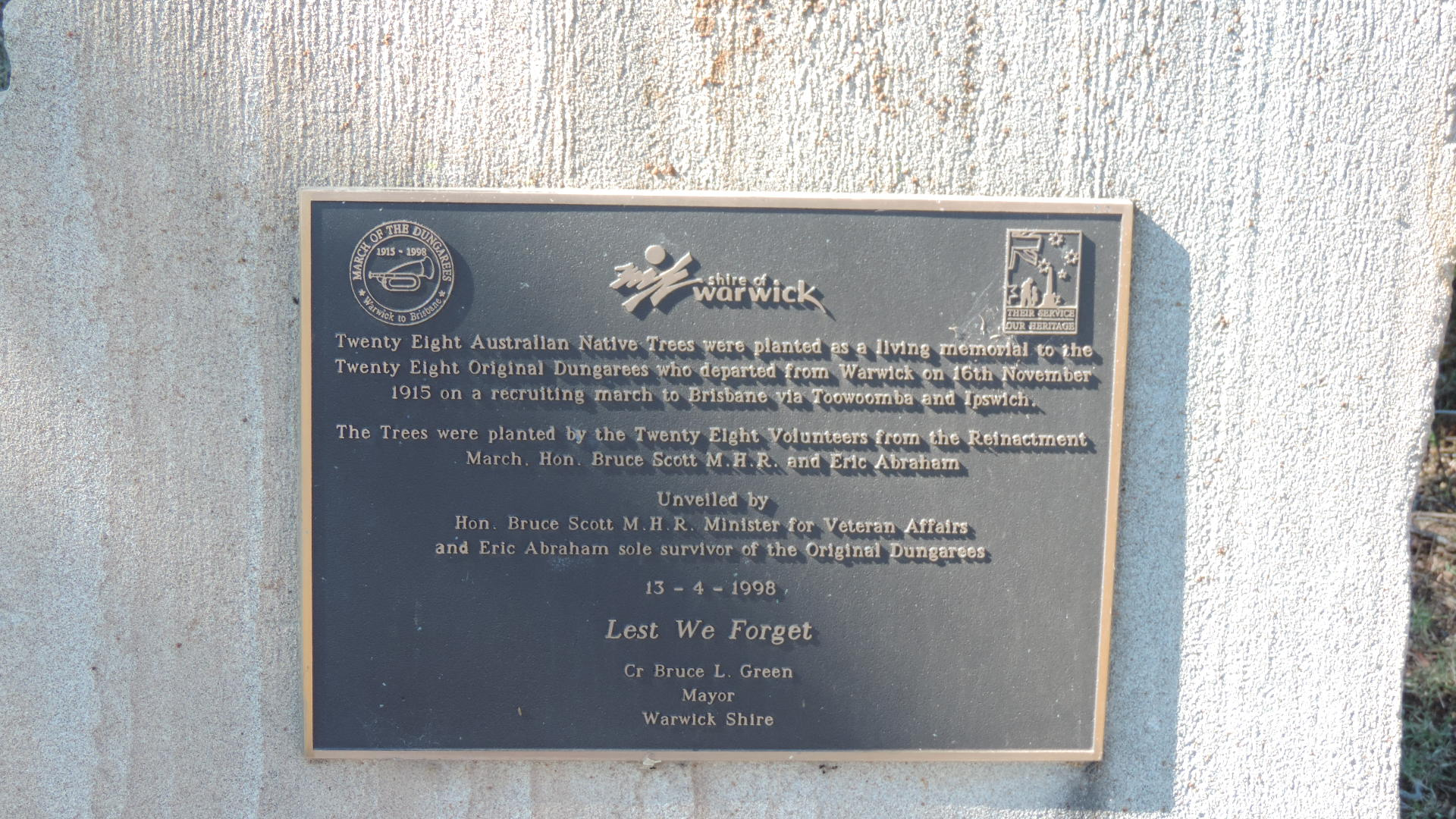
Memorial to the original 28 Dungarees, adjacent to Warwick General Cemetery, 2015 01

In the late 1990s the Australian War Graves office refurbished the Warwick War Cemetery (located within Warwick General Cemetery) for $30,000 and this section includes a new lawn cemetery, columbarium and memorials to all fallen servicemen. It was re-opened on 12 April 1998, the same day that 28 trees were planted along Wentworth Street, opposite the Warwick War Graves, and dedicated in honour of the 28 original "Dungaree" recruits who departed Warwick on 16 November 1915 for service in the First World War.

There are many extant early graves and memorials in this burial ground. They include an 1863 grave of James Jackson who is credited with the founding of Freemasonry in Queensland. His grave is still maintained by the Warwick Masons. An early doctor, Dr Jonathon Labatt born in Ireland in 1808 and died in 1869, lobbied for a vaccine institution on the Downs. Accidents often caused deaths. Octavius Frederick Farquharson aged 22 was buried in 1867 after a fall from his horse.

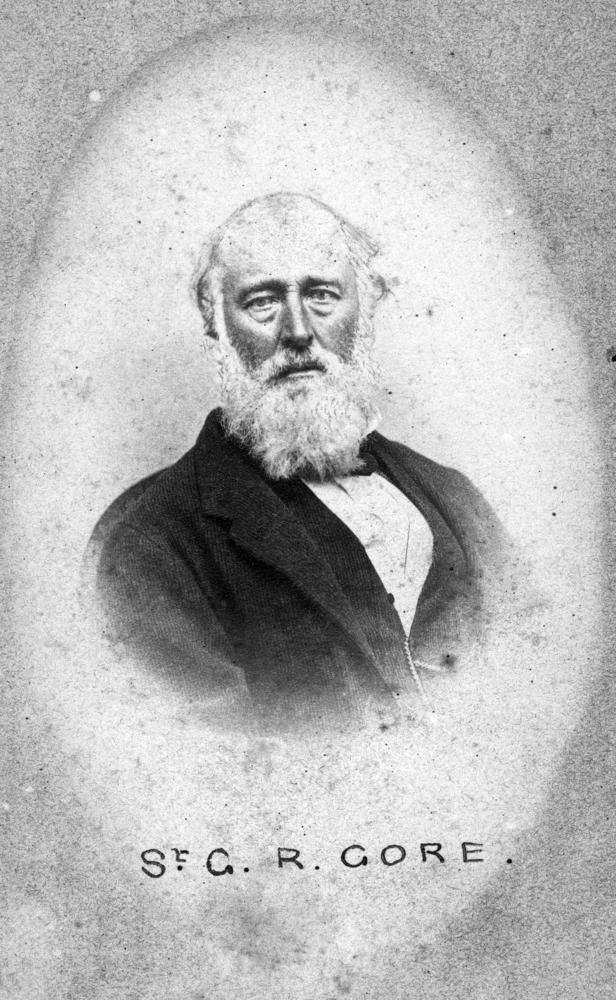
St. George Richard Gore, 1862

Andrew Fitzherbert (Herbert) Evans died in 1870; he was Warwicks first Clerk of Petty Sessions and he purchased the land that became the first part of the Cemetery Reserve. St George Richard Gore who died in 1871, was an early pastoralist, the district's first Member of the Queensland Legislative Assembly and Queensland's first Minister of Lands and Public Works. Scottish born John Deuchar worked for the pastoralist Leslie brothers before established his own merino sheep station in 1855 and in 1867 built his two-storey homestead, the well-known Glengallan Homestead. Deuchar was responsible for monuments in memory of his many employees and servants. He died in 1872 and was survived by his wife who is also buried in the Deuchar family plot. Another politician's grave is that of James Morgan who died in 1878. Morgan was instrumental in Warwick becoming a municipality in 1861, was an alderman in the first council, editor of the Warwick Argus, and the local state politician 1869–70 and 1873–76. Not all graves are those of important people, a South Sea Islander was buried in 1879 and another in 1881, and an 1880 grave is that of James Caulfield who died as a result of a railway blasting operation.

There are numerous children's graves as child mortality used to be high. The Clark family contains a gravestone to three children; Maria died in 1866, her 3-year-old brother and an 18-day-old sister on 21 August 1872. Their father, Charles Clark moved to the Darling Downs in 1861 where he and a partner established the first flourmill in Warwick. In 1868 Charles and his brother George bought Old Talgai which became well known for high-grade merino wool.

Warwick General Cemetery includes monuments for immigrants such as that of Frederich Reimers. He was born in Schleswich-Holstein in 1839, settled in the municipality of Warwick during the 1860s becoming a local cabinetmaker and undertaker. He died in 1915. Warwick's first stonemason, Scottish born John McCulloch established his business in 1863 on the corner of Wood and Dragon Streets. He was responsible for many of the cemetery monuments and his name is associated with masonry buildings such as St Marks Church, the Warwick Court House, the Warwick Town Hall and the Warwick railway goods shed. He died in 1918.

A 1944 grave is that of Monsignor Michael Potter who founded the Warwick Catholic Young Men's Society in 1894. He was nicknamed "the Builder", as he was responsible for the construction of several rural churches, and Warwick's St Mary's Cathedral and Christian Brothers College. The Sterne family plot includes Warwick born Henry Sterne who died in 1954. He was an Alderman for 28 years and editor of the Warwick Examiner and Times for 29 years. Buried beside him is his second wife Elizabeth Sterne OBE who was involved with various community organisations such as the Country Women's Association.

Early pastoralists imported Chinese to work as shepherds, servants and gardeners and after the discovery of gold and tin in the district more Chinese moved to the area. Between 1875 and 1897 there were 24 Chinese buried in the pagan section, with a further 20 between 1990 and 1919. While many of the remains of those interred in this cemetery were later sent home to China and other markers have been lost, there are still marked graves in the pagan section of the cemetery. The Council is currently considering how to fence this area and recognise the contribution of these immigrants to the development of the district.

== Description ==
The northern end of the Warwick General Cemetery has the oldest graves and from the northern end the cemetery is divided into the old section which includes the Pagan, Jewish, Methodist, Congregational, Presbyterian, Catholic and Church of England sections. The southern end towards Lancaster Street is also divided into sections. The highest point of the Warwick General Cemetery is dominated by the Mitchner Memorial with the land descending gradually down to Wentworth and Lancaster Streets and the council depot and on the western elevation the terrain declines to a flatter area used as the lawn cemetery.

The Wentworth Street cyclone wire fence is divided by gates hinged on sandstone pillars that mark the entrance to each section. Within the monumental cemetery roads and pathways form a grid pattern and dividing it into denominational sections, while a road separates the lawn graves from the monumental sections. At its northern end this road curves separating the pagan and Methodist sections before straightening near the central north south road.

The most prominent structure in the cemetery is the Mitchner Memorial Shelter-shed, to one side of the central roadway and in the Church of England section. This memorial is octagonal in shape with 430-millimetre (17 in) English bond brickwork with fine white pointing. The openings on the four points of the compass have gothic arches while alternative walls have a pair of smaller unglazed gothic arches.

Surmounting the octagonal corrugated iron roof is a ventilated octagonal timber belfry with a bell installed. The belfry and roofs have wide low-pitched gables over each door. Each corner is delineated by buttresses and stuccoed bands give an horizontal emphasis. The arch of all openings also has stucco surround. These bands are external and internal.

The floor is concrete while the ceiling is tongue and groove with eight iron ties radiating out from a central circle. Long timber pew- like seats abut walls. A sandstone vault is centrally located, on each end is a marble plaque with cross and the eastern aspect has a marble tablet inscribed: The William Mitchner Memorial This shelter shed is the gift of William Mitchner for the benefit of the public Under this stone lies his body Born August 2, 1841 Died Jude 1st 1918 A marble bust stands on a marble slab above the sarcophagus.

Complementing this 1926 rest area and nearby on the south is an E-shaped columbarium (c.1972), protected on the east by a modern garden.

Many of the tombstones are by local stonemasons, including James McCulloch, and others were transported from afar. Gravestones vary from simple upright tablets to more elaborate late Victorian types, including obelisks, broken columns, Celtic and Calvary crosses, urn- topped columns, horizontal slabs with tablets and more modern heart shaped memorials. War graves are simple white slabs with the brass tablet.

An unusual memorial is a bodystone, a horizontal tombstone in the shape of a burial casket. A 1908 memorial in memory of a wife who died shortly after her marriage is a marble angel that appears to drops fresh flowers onto his beloved's grave. A 1924 memorial to a young man features a football and a broken column symbolising a life cut short. A large 1939 monument near the Lawn Cemetery has a pink granite base below crafted sandstone with an urn framed by columns. The 1942 grave of a farmer who studied taxidermy has a small kingfisher in a glass-fronted niche at the base of his heart shaped polished black granite headstone. This tombstone is further embellished with fern sprays and a dove in flight.

Inscriptions can provide biographical information, personal history and cause of death. The 1866 gravestone of Elizabeth Diamond Hammersley includes that she died at Glengallan and was a servant to John Deuchar. The words on the McLeod tombstone, which includes the names of a three-year-old and 8-month-old child who both died in September 1864, suggest an epidemic or tragedy. A rough headstone of a man killed accidentally has the words "Thy Will Be Done". Martin Otto Roggenkamp's inscription not only provides date of birth and death it also includes his occupation of painter. Inscriptions often include place of birth, words such as "native of Westmeath, Ireland" and "born Taunton Somerset England". Inscriptions also reveal if it is a monument for a single person or several persons, and usually provides the relationships. In the Jewish section there is a memorial to two young children. The inscription is in both Hebrew and English. The few extant Chinese memorials are tablets with inscriptions in Chinese characters.

Grave plots can be for a single person or a family group. Some of the older graves have cast-iron picket fencing such as the Clark family's which also has a gate. The majority of graves have a concrete kerbing.

While pine trees are along the road beside the Lawn Cemetery few exist in the older parts of the cemetery. Graves often seem crowded in this older section and the paths and graves do not have the rigid grid layout as in the post-1930s sections.

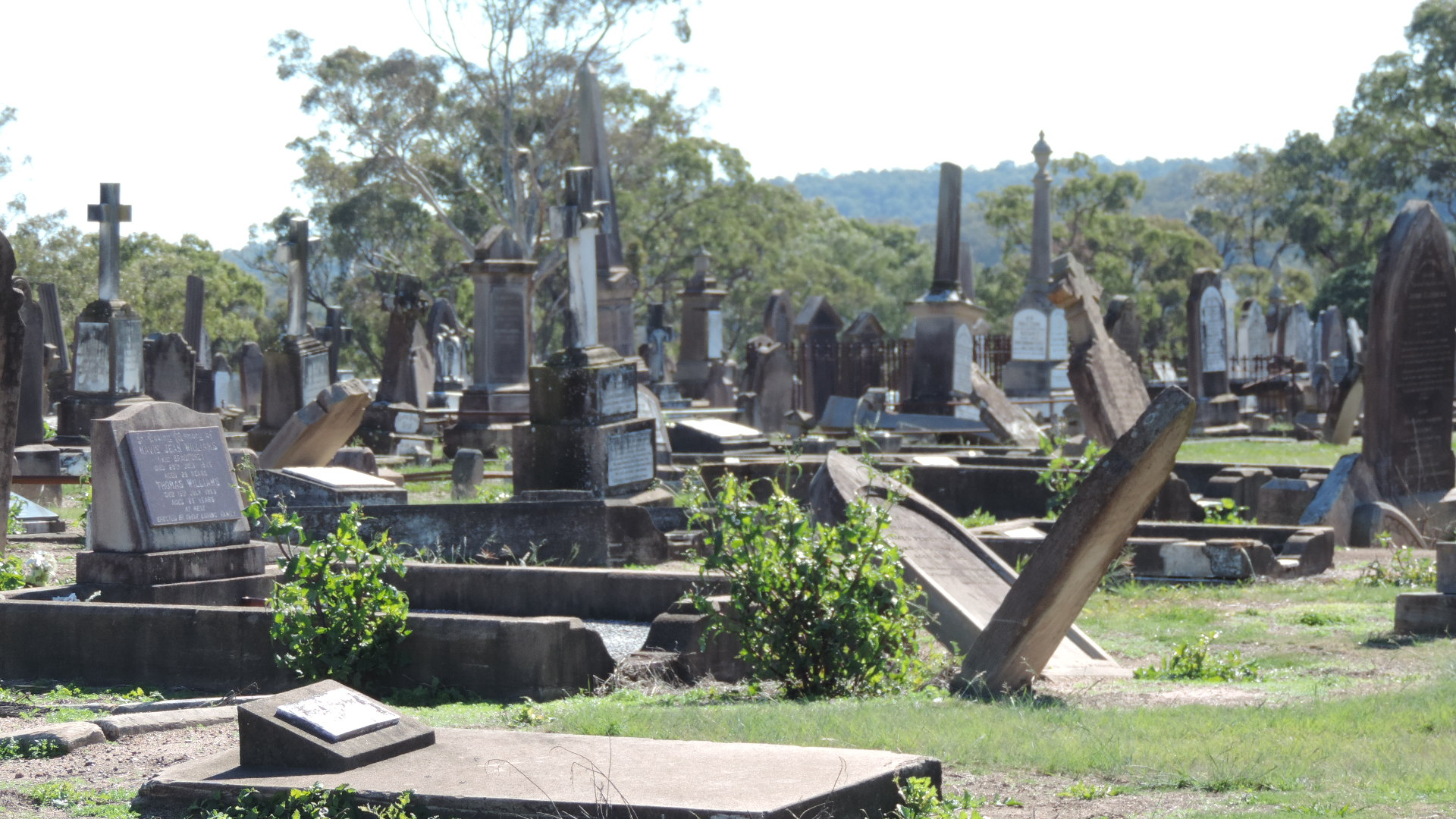
Deteriorating headstones, 2015

The cemetery is well maintained, however, in the older sections some monuments have deteriorated and others lean at oblique angles.

== Heritage listing ==
Warwick General Cemetery was listed on the Queensland Heritage Register on 27 April 2001 having satisfied the following criteria.

The place is important in demonstrating the evolution or pattern of Queensland's history.

Warwick General Cemetery is important in demonstrating the evolution of Queensland history in that it provides evidence of the occupations, social status and demography of the Warwick district, particularly displaying the diversity of the town's cultural, religious and ethnic groups since the 1850s. Warwick General Cemetery has significance as one of the oldest cemeteries in Queensland. Brisbane's two oldest extant cemeteries are Dunwich Cemetery gazetted in 1849 and the Nundah Cemetery which dates from the 1840s. The Toowoomba Drayton cemetery like that at Warwick was surveyed in 1850. Thomas Ayers was buried in the Drayton cemetery on 11 September 1850 and the earliest known Warwick Cemetery burial occurred in 1853.

The place is important in demonstrating the principal characteristics of a particular class of cultural places.

Warwick General Cemetery survives as a good example of its type, with a variety of headstones and monuments illustrating changing public attitudes to commemoration of the dead. While monuments and headstones vary in size, quality and condition they reflect the social, religious and architectural history of Warwick from the 1850s to the 21st century.

The place is important because of its aesthetic significance.

The form and design of the shelter-shed and its dominating central position exhibits aesthetic characteristics valued by the community as do the diversity of headstones, grounds, and formal arrangement of graves.

The place has a strong or special association with a particular community or cultural group for social, cultural or spiritual reasons.

The large masonry Mitchner Shelter-shed, designed by prominent Warwick architects Dornbusch and Connolly, was a given to the community by William Mitchner for the benefit of the community as a roofed rest area for use during interments, when visiting, refuge from the weather and as a meeting place. It has a special association with the Warwick community for social, cultural and spiritual reasons.

The place has a special association with the life or work of a particular person, group or organisation of importance in Queensland's history.

The cemetery has a special association with many notable individuals and families who have contributed to the historical evolution of Warwick and district and to the mythology associated with pastoral and pioneering life.
