= Glennie Hall =

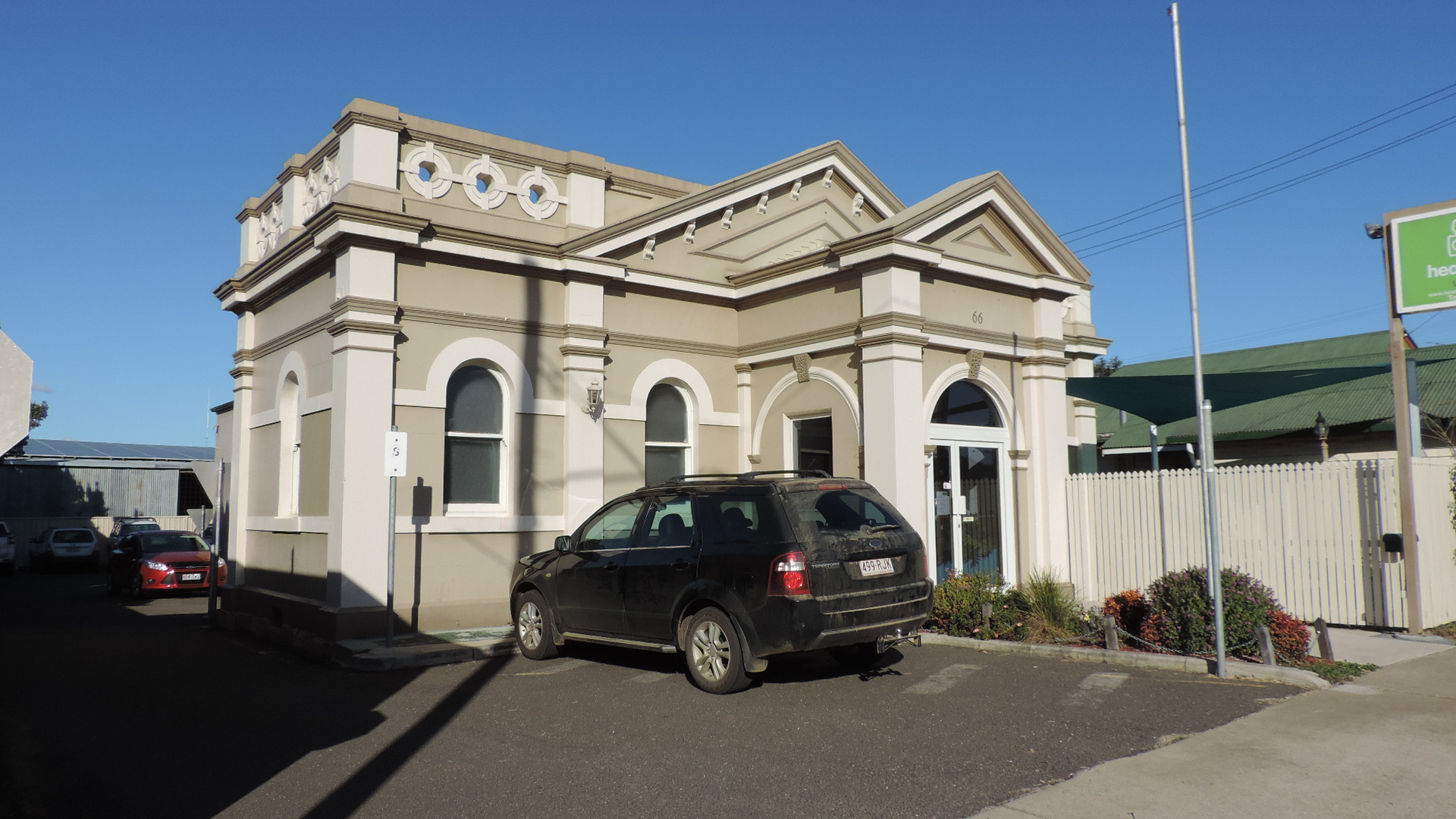
- Glennie Hall, 2015

- Location within Queensland Location within Australia
- 28.2181°S 152.035°E
- Location: 66 Albion Street, Warwick, Southern Downs Region, Queensland, Australia

History
- Design period: 1870s–1890s (late 19th century)
- Built: 1880–1891

Site notes
- Architect: Wallace & Gibson
- Architectural style: Classicism

Queensland Heritage Register
- Official name: Glennie Hall, Odd Fellows Hall
- Type: state heritage (built)
- Designated: 5 July 2001
- Reference no.: 601505
- Significant period: 1880–1881, 1891 (fabric); 1881–1912, 1921, 1935, 1957–1970 (historical)
- Builders: E B Budgen

Glennie Hall is a heritage-listed community hall at 66 Albion Street, Warwick, Southern Downs Region, Queensland, Australia. It was designed by Wallace & Gibson and built from 1880 to 1891 by E B Budgen. It is also known as Odd Fellows Hall. It was added to the Queensland Heritage Register on 5 July 2001.

== History ==
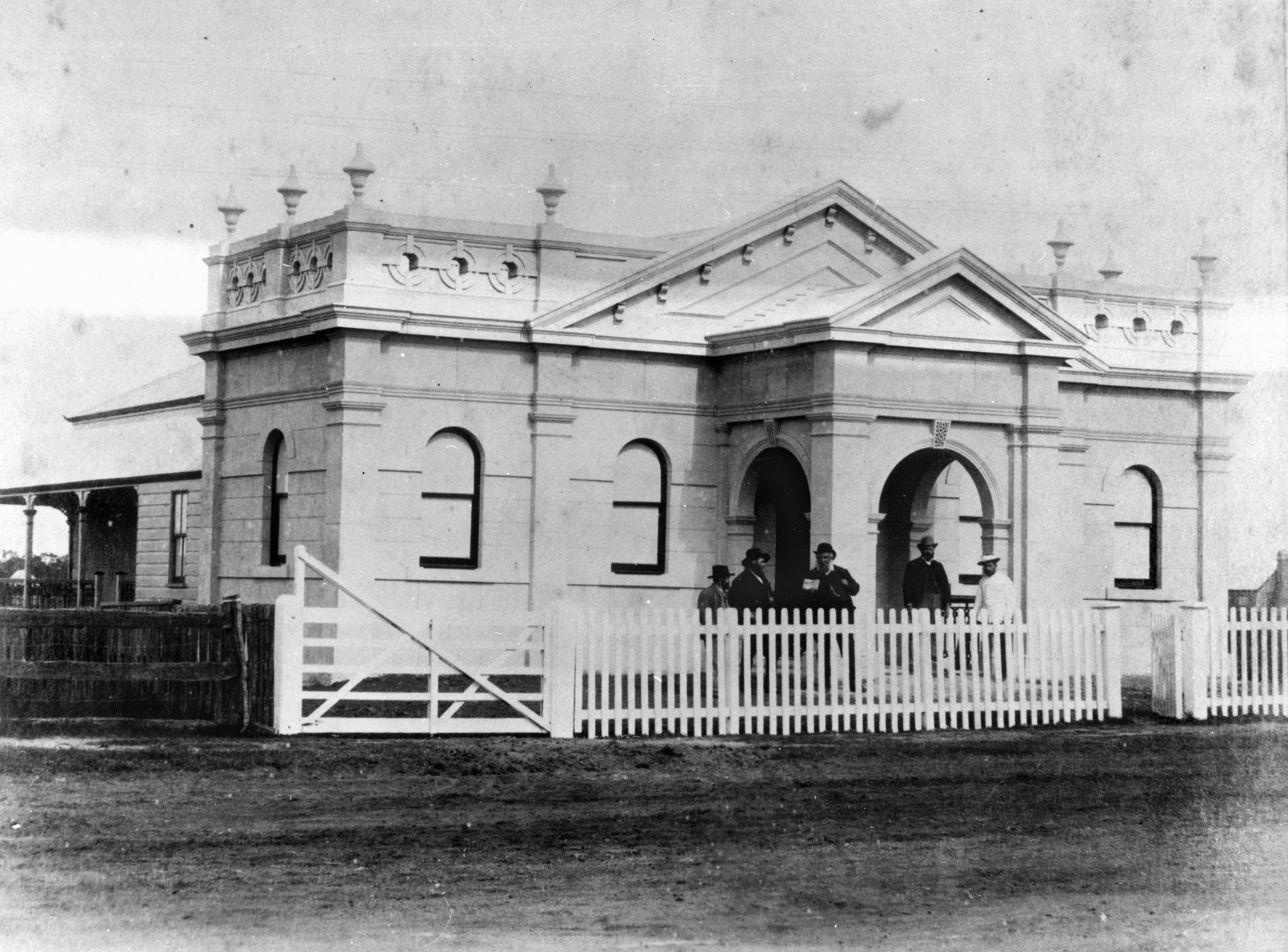
Oddfellows Hall in Warwick

A single-storey masonry hall designed by architects William Wallace and Richard Gibson was built 1880–81 on the southern end of Albion Street for the Royal Rose of Warwick Manchester Unity Independent Order of Odd Fellows (MUIOOF) Lodge. Wallace and Gibson were responsible for the entrance lobby and parapeted front rooms added in 1891.

Allan Cunningham's exploration of the southern Darling Downs in 1827 revealed the potential of the area for pastoral and agricultural usage. However, it was not until the 1840s that pastoralists moved into the district. It was at the end of the decade that Warwick started emerging as an administrative centre and a town serving the local pastoralists. The northern end of Albion Street, near the Condamine River ford, developed as the main administrative and business area, but flooding resulted in movement away from this area by the 1870s.

While the first Oddfellows Lodge in Queensland opened in Brisbane in 1847 it was not until 1871 that the Rose of Warwick MUIOFF was founded. Friendly societies believed in self-help, and by making regular set contributions members and their families secured benefits when ill, unable to work, for funeral service and clothes for the widow and family. Lodges were meant to practice universal brotherhood and be open to all religious persuasions. Each lodge was an individual financial entity run on democratic lines and the aim was for good fellowship, benevolence, charity and improving of morals. Lodges met fortnightly and often concluded with a paper or talk. They ran social events and raised funds to ensure profitability of the lodges. Oddfellowship did practice secrecy, wore regalia and had specified ceremonies. Acceptance into an Oddfellows lodge was after being medically checked, approval by members, payment of an initiation fee and the actual ceremony. Lodges employed a local doctor to look after members and paid for approved medicines from the selected pharmacist/chemist.

By 1878 there were two MUIOOF lodges in Warwick with the Loyal Rose Lodge meeting fortnightly in their Town Hall lodge room. Lodge members were actively involved in the community and raised funds by organising balls and athletic events. It was on 30 August 1880 that the local state parliamentarian, Jacob Horwitz, laid the foundation stone for the Oddfellows Hall at the southern end of Albion Street. It was designed by prominent Warwick architects Wallace and Gisbon with brickwork by Brother EB Budgen and cost £268. The hall was formally opened at the January 1881 meeting of the Loyal Rose Lodge.

In 1891 the Oddfellows decided to enlarge their hall and again employed architects Wallace and Gibson. The tender for these additions that included an imposing front facade, front rooms and side verandahs was for £413/10/- and the total cost was over £600. The Warwick Argus of 25 July 1891 commented that builder John Longwill was making rapid progress with the Oddfellows Hall and "The new front, which will be very imposing when complete, is now nearly high enough to obscure the main portion of the hall. When complete, the building will present a very neat and roomy appearance".

The Oddfellows Hall was used for fortnightly MUIOOF lodge meetings, WPO meetings and dancing classes. It was also a venue for Oddfellows social evenings and rented as a hall to many other local organisations, for example football clubs. Over 100 couples attended a fancy dress ball in the Hall when the first anniversary of the formation of Female Oddfellows was celebrated in August 1907. About 1908 a new floor costing £80 was laid in the Lodge Hall.

Old-age pensions of £26 per year were introduced by the Queensland government on 1 July 1908 and in September delegates from the various Warwick friendly societies met to discuss the benefits of forming an association. By 31 October 1908 the Warwick and District Friendly Societies Association was founded and office bearers elected. The Commonwealth Government's introduction of the old age pension in 1909 which was soon supplemented by an invalid pension and introduction of the maternity bonus in 1912, was the onset of the welfare state and a death knoll for friendly societies.

Throughout 1909, 1910 and 1911 the three Warwick MUIOOF lodges continued to meet in the Oddfellows Hall and rent it out for social events and as a meeting place for other organisations. Perhaps the government social welfare legislation had reduced the number of members, or the need for a hall was no longer felt to be a necessity, or for some other reason, but by early 1912 the Royal Rose of Warwick MUIOOF was sold to John Lamb for a four figure price. Lamb used the hall as a wine and spirit store in connection with his already established business. In 1915 Lamb leased the business to William Reuben McEwin. The hall ceased being used as a wine and spirit store about 1916.

The Church of England purchased the Oddfellows Hall in 1921 for £800. After spending over £400 on refurbishment including adding modern conveniences the hall was official opened by the Anglican Archbishop of Brisbane on 21 August 1921 as the home of the St Marks Young Men's Club. It was renamed the Glennie Hall in honour of Archdeacon Benjamin Glennie who conducted the first Warwick Anglican Church services in September 1848. In 1860 Archdeacon Glennie moved to Warwick to serve as the parish priest until 1872. He was responsible for the erection of St Mark's Anglican Church and encouraging regular church attendance.

St Mark's Young Men's Club was formed on 10 August 1920 with 21 members, one year later membership had increased to 129. The Club aimed for the development of mental and social culture amongst its members. The Club's fortnightly meetings included public debating, mock banquets, preparing articles for the magazine, giving of papers, addresses from visiting speakers. Another important activity was social fund raising evenings such as dances.

While the Warwick MUIOOF lodges held their fortnightly meetings in the Masonic Lodge they continued to use Glennie Hall for social events as did other local organisations.

A dramatic change of use occurred in 1935 when radio station 4WK inaugurated broadcasting to the district within 50 miles (80 km) of Warwick from Glennie Hall on 6 May 1935. One of the 1920s innovations was radio communication. Radio broadcasting was used for not only news broadcasting but for the spread of information and education and 4WK presented poetry in Children's programs, provided intelligence on local happenings and helped raise funds for organisations such as the Lord Kitchener's Cheapside Mission.

Rosenthal Shire Council purchased the land from the Church by 20 December 1957 with the hall becoming the shires administration centre. The shire used the hall for functions including Health Department inoculations. While this long block of land had space for the Shire's heavy equipment and a workshop the increasing heavy highway traffic was to prove problematic for the moving of machinery in and out. While Rosenthal Shire adjoined Warwick Town Council and there were various boundary changes, the Shire offices were always in the Warwick central business district. It is probable that the Shire installed a fireproof safe for secure storage of council records.

Vacated by the Shire in 1970, by 1974 Glennie Hall had new owners and became a gymnasium. Subdivided in 1991, with the larger rear area used as a bus depot, the hall was sold and became an antique shop. Put up for auction on 26 March 1994, when it was described as including kitchen, toilets, offices and display areas, it had been recently painted inside and outside. Internally there was a central hall with rooms of various sizes opening off it including a strongroom. After, 1994 it was used as a restaurant, and was vacant for a period.

In January 2001 Glennie Hall was again for sale. A sign informed those interested that the building contained a fully renovated gourmet kitchen, a cold room and bar, sealed rear carpark, two-room accommodation fully furnished and fitted out to down to crockery, and the place was suitable for nightclub, bar, showroom, restaurant, office or other use.

In 2012, the hall was renovated for and taken over by mental health service Headspace, who continue to operate out of the building as of 2015.

A 1921 photograph shows that there was a convex verandah on the actual hall's northern elevation. This photograph and another when Glennie Hall was a radio station show that urns surmounted the pilasters. A low picket fence and shrubs have replaced the front picket fence, the verandah has disappeared and an awning added to the front entrance. As the place has not been inspected internal changes are not known.

== Description ==
Glennie Hall is a single-storey symmetrical masonry building. It is set close to Albion Street, which is a section of the busy Cunningham Highway linking Brisbane to Sydney and Melbourne.

Glennie Hall appears to have an inverted T-shape plan, with a rectangular front and the rectangular stem of the hall has a corrugated iron gable roof. The 1891 front wing is designed in a symmetrical neoclassical style.

The 1891 section has an ornate parapet broken by a central gable and small gable roof entry lobby. This gable has an open-bed pediment above the central front opening. The openings on either side of the entrance have rectangular windows surmounted by an arched concrete moulding descending to a dripstone and broken by a keystone. The pair of windows either side of the entrance and side windows are casement windows and are delineated by concrete moulding that is horizontal beneath the sill and outlines the arch of the window shape. All windows are recessed into the wall.

The architects employed geometric shapes to enhance this hall. The base has a strong horizontal emphasis that is reinforced by the horizontal window moulding and entablature beneath the parapet. Roundness is emphasised by the semi-circle window heads and mouldings and the circular decorations in the parapet. Supporting vertical brackets and gable like moulding infill enforces the oblique line of the parapets central gable.

The northern elevation of the 1881 hall is not ornate and appears to have two windows and a door near where it adjoins the 1891 section.

== Heritage listing ==
Glennie Hall was listed on the Queensland Heritage Register on 5 July 2001 having satisfied the following criteria.

The place is important in demonstrating the evolution or pattern of Queensland's history.

While Albion Street was once the Warwick administrative and business area, this place is the only remaining colonial structure. This place demonstrates a way of life during the late nineteenth and early twentieth centuries when friendly societies were a prominent and expanding part of Queensland society. The Oddfellows like other Friendly Societies was a voluntary association where members paid periodic payments and received sickness and funeral benefits. That Glennie Hall has been used as a hall for specific groups and the community, a wine and spirits store, radio station, shire office, gymnasium, shop and restaurant demonstrates the growth of Warwick and changing social needs of the community.

The place is important in demonstrating the principal characteristics of a particular class of cultural places.

The Oddfellows hall, designed by prominent Warwick architects Wallace and Gibson, opened in 1881. The front wing, also designed by Wallace and Gibson, was added in 1891. This single-storey hall's front facade with its articulated geometry is important in illustrating the design, materials and construction techniques of late-19th century masonry building in Queensland.

The place has a strong or special association with a particular community or cultural group for social, cultural or spiritual reasons.

The Oddfellows played an important community role in pre social welfare days. The hall was the venue for their meetings and social events and other community activities. As Glennie Hall, and home to St Mark's Young Men's Club, it social usage continued as it was rented out for community activities to various organisations including the Oddfellows.

The place has a special association with the life or work of a particular person, group or organisation of importance in Queensland's history.

That this place has retained the name Glennie Hall since 1921 reveals the strong association of Warwick with Archdeacon Glennie even though the place has been employed for broadcasting and local government administration.
