= Arthur Morgan (Australian politician, born 1856) =

Australian politician

The Honourable Sir Arthur Morgan
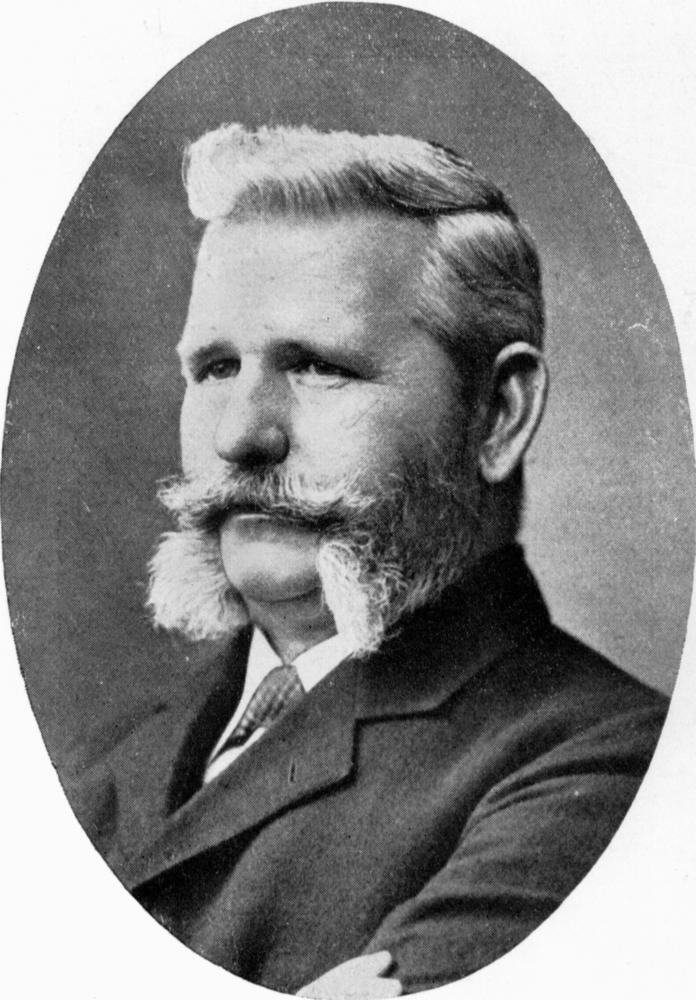
- Morgan in 1908

16th Premier of Queensland
- In office 17 September 1903 – 19 January 1906
- Preceded by: Robert Philp
- Succeeded by: William Kidston
- Constituency: Warwick

Speaker of the Queensland Legislative Assembly
- In office 16 May 1899 – 15 September 1903
- Preceded by: Alfred Cowley
- Succeeded by: Alfred Cowley
- Constituency: Warwick

Member of the Queensland Legislative Assembly for Warwick
- In office 18 July 1887 – 4 April 1896
- Preceded by: Jacob Horwitz
- Succeeded by: Thomas Byrnes
- In office 22 October 1898 – 19 January 1906
- Preceded by: Thomas Byrnes
- Succeeded by: Thomas O'Sullivan

Member of the Queensland Legislative Council
- In office 19 January 1906 – 20 December 1916

Personal details
- Born: 19 September 1856 Warwick, Queensland
- Died: 20 December 1916 (aged 60) Paddington, Brisbane, Queensland, Australia
- Resting place: Toowong Cemetery
- Party: Ministerialist
- Other political affiliations: Opposition
- Spouse: Alice Augusta Clinton
- Relations: James Morgan (father) Arthur Morgan (son)
- Occupation: Newspaper proprietor

Sir Arthur Morgan (19 September 1856 – 20 December 1916) was an Australian politician who was Premier of Queensland from 1903 to 1906.

== Early life ==
Morgan was born in Warwick, Colony of New South Wales, the fourth son of James Morgan, who later represented Warwick in the Legislative Assembly of Queensland and became the chairman of committees, and his wife Kate (née Barton). Morgan was educated at a public school at Warwick and then joined the staff of the Warwick Argus, which was owned and edited by his father. Morgan married Alice Augusta Clinton, daughter of H. E. Clinton, on 26 July 1880.

== Career ==
Morgan became a member of the Warwick Municipal Council in 1885 and served as mayor since 1886–1890 and again in 1898. In 1887 he was elected a member of the Queensland Legislative Assembly for the district of Warwick, and held this seat until 1896. In 1899, he was re-elected to this seat, and in that same year was chosen as the Speaker of the Legislative Assembly of Queensland.

In 1903, businessman and politician Robert Philp resigned as Premier of Queensland on account of defections from his party, and the leader of the Labor party being unable to form a ministry. Morgan was asked to lead a combination of a group of liberals and the labour party. He later resigned the speakership, and went on to form a ministry. After that, he held the positions of the premier, chief secretary, secretary for railways, and vice-president of the executive council. Morgan's policy of retrenchment made him unpopular, and his alliance with the labour party was seen as questionable by his former associates. In January 1906, after the death of Sir Hugh Nelson, Morgan was appointed as president of the Queensland Legislative Council and was acting-governor on two occasions. In 1908 he was appointed to the seat of Lieutenant-Governor of Queensland.

He published a manuscript in 1902 entitled Discovery and Development of the Downs, and was knighted in 1907.

== Later life ==
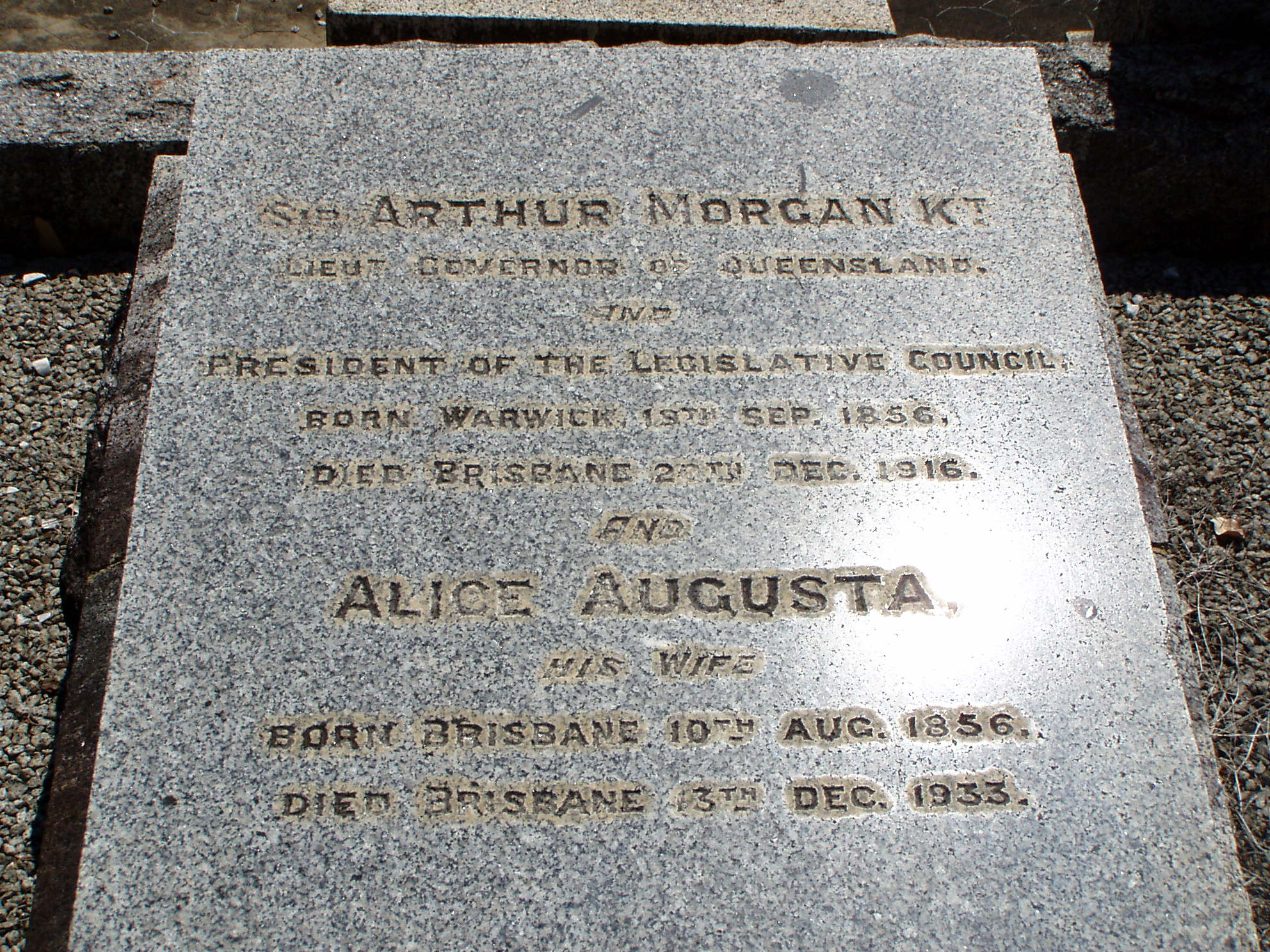
Sir Arthur Morgan's headstone at Brisbane's Toowong Cemetery.

In his later years, Morgan's health began to fail, and he died on 20 December 1916. Morgan was survived by his wife, five sons and three daughters.

Political offices
Preceded by Robert Philp	Premier of Queensland; 1903 – 1906	Succeeded by William Kidston
Parliament of Queensland
Preceded by Alfred Cowley	Speaker of the Legislative Assembly; 1899 – 1903	Succeeded by Alfred Cowley
Preceded by Jacob Horwitz	Member for Warwick; 1887–1896	Succeeded by Thomas Byrnes
Preceded by Thomas Byrnes	Member for Warwick; 1898–1906	Succeeded by Thomas O'Sullivan
