= Edmond Thornton =

Australian politician in Queensland (1841–1901)

Member of the Queensland Legislative Assembly for Warwick
- In office 23 September 1868 – 10 August 1870
- Preceded by: George Clark
- Succeeded by: James Morgan

Member of the Queensland Legislative Assembly for Eastern Downs
- In office 22 July 1871 – 6 November 1873
- Preceded by: Arthur Macalister
- Succeeded by: Seat abolished

Personal details
- Born: Edmond Lambert Thornton; August 1841 Burton in Lonsdale, Yorkshire, England
- Died: 13 March 1901 (aged 59) Brisbane, Queensland, Australia
- Resting place: South Brisbane Cemetery
- Spouse: Margaret Horrigan (m.1869 d.1920)
- Occupation: Grazier

Edmond Lambert Thornton (1841–1901) was a politician in Queensland, Australia. He was a Member of the Queensland Legislative Assembly.

He represented Warwick, 23 September 1868 to 10 August 1870, and represented Eastern Downs, 22 July 1871 to 6 November 1873.

== Early life ==
He was born in August 1841 at Burton-in-Lonsdale, Yorkshire, England.

In 1869 he married Margaret Horrigan in Warwick and together had 8 sons and 6 daughters.

== Later life ==
He owned a property in Warwick "Lonsdale" on Freestone Road and was mayor in Warwick in 1869–1870. He died 13 March 1901 at Brisbane, Queensland, Australia and was buried in South Brisbane Cemetery.

Parliament of Queensland
Preceded by George Clark	Member for Warwick; 1868–1870	Succeeded by James Morgan
Preceded by Arthur Macalister	Member for Eastern Downs; 1871–1873	Abolished
