= The Talgai Skull =

The Talgai Skull: An Investigation Into the Origin of the Australian Aborigines
- Directed by: Tom Haydon
- Release date: 1968
- Running time: 58 min
- Country: Australia
- Language: English

The Talgai Skull: An Investigation Into the Origin of the Australian Aborigines is a 1968 Australian film about the Talgai Skull. It shared the 1968 Australian Film Institute Award for Best Documentary and won the 1969 Logie Award for Best Documentary.
