= Talgai Homestead =

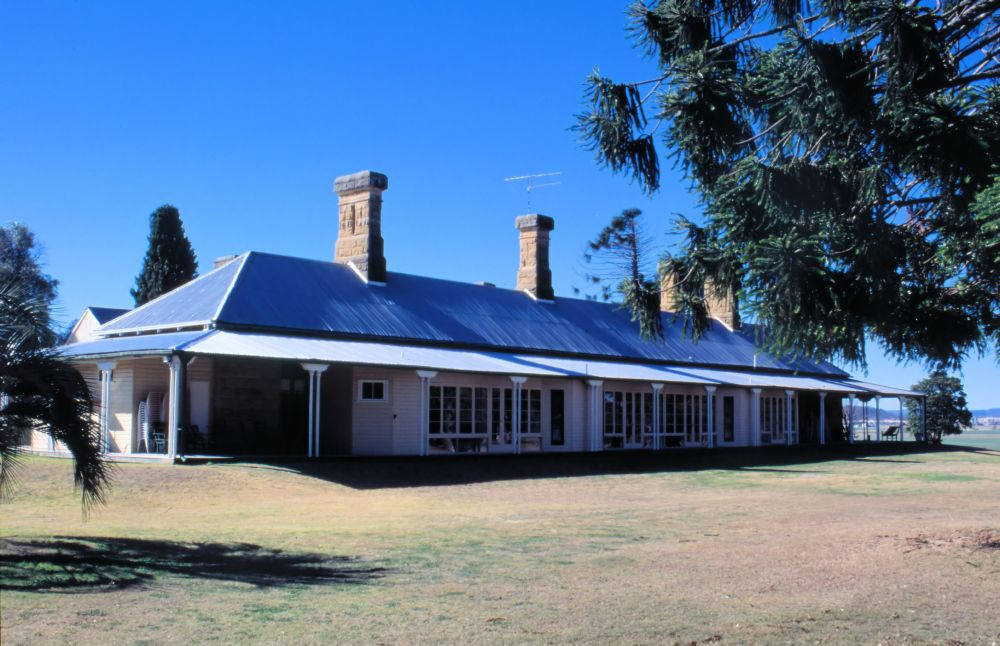
- Talgai Homestead, 1995

- Location within Queensland Location within Australia
- 28.0505°S 151.9333°E
- Location: Allora, Southern Downs Region, Queensland, Australia

History
- Design period: 1840s–1860s (mid-19th century)
- Built: 1868–1934
- Built for: George Edwin Clark

Site notes
- Architect: Richard George Suter

Queensland Heritage Register
- Official name: Talgai Homestead
- Type: state heritage (landscape, built)
- Designated: 21 August 1992
- Reference no.: 600006
- Significant period: 1860s–1880s (historical); 1860s–1880s, 1910s–1920s (fabric); 1860s–1940s (social)
- Significant components: driveway, store/s / storeroom / storehouse, butcher's shop / killing shed / slaughter house (pastoral), residential accommodation – staff quarters, farm buildings, stables, trees/plantings, farmhouse, tennis court, chimney/chimney stack, farmstead, residential accommodation – main house, weir, well

Talgai Homestead is a heritage-listed homestead at Allora, Southern Downs Region, Queensland, Australia. It was designed by architect Richard George Suter for Queensland pastoralist and politician George Clark and was built in 1868. It was added to the Queensland Heritage Register on 21 August 1992. It is also known as East Talgai Homestead to distinguish it from the West Talgai Homestead built by Clark's brother, Charles Clark. The homestead is now a private residence, owned by the Nioa family.

== History ==
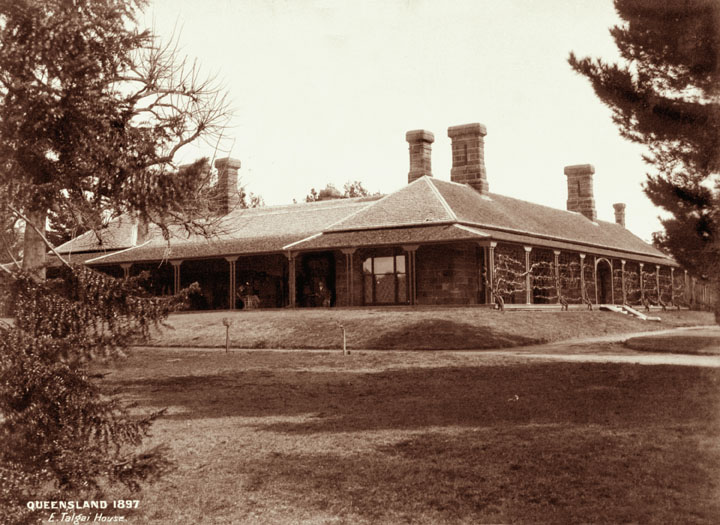
Homestead at East Talgai, 1897

Talgai Homestead was built in 1868 for George Edwin Clark, then owner of that part of the old Talgai run which lies east of the present Toowoomba–Warwick rail line and was designed by prominent Queensland architect Richard George Suter. This substantial sandstone homestead was first known as "East Talgai" the second of three "Talgais" to be constructed on what was part of the original "Talgai" run taken up by Ernest Elphinstone Dalrymple in 1840.

Ernest Elphinstone Dalrymple was part of the first wave of European settlers, who included Patrick and George Leslie, and George and John Gammie, to drive stock to the newfound Darling Downs area on receiving instructions from explorer Allan Cunningham who first recognised the potential of the area for pastoral settlement in 1827. These early squatters overlanded their stock through the New England district from Sydney as access to the Darling Downs through the penal settlement of Moreton Bay was not allowed, nor was any settlement within 50 miles (80 km) of the penal colony permitted. This group of pastoralists were instrumental in settling the land which in subsequent decades was to become Queensland's prime pastoral and agricultural district and which also became a seat of political power in 19th century Queensland.

Dalrymple only held the Talgai run until his death in 1844 after which Talgai passed through several owners, possibly being owned by the Gammie brothers at one point. In 1862, the property was divided, with the southern portion becoming "North Toolburra" and Clark and Hamner acquiring the portion known as Old Talgai where they ran a high-grade wool merino stud. This partnership was later broken and the property remained in Hamner's possession until his death, when it passed to the Queensland Cattle Company, and later to Lucht, who sold it to George and Charles Clark in 1865.

The Clark brothers divided the land again, George taking East Talgai and Charles taking the western portion, on which the Old Talgai homestead had stood. In 1874 Charles Clark constructed his own home, Ellinthorpe Hall (the third Talgai) on this western portion of the run and this homestead later became known as "West Talgai". Charles Clark left Talgai in 1890, the western portion of the land eventually being subdivided for closer settlement with the homestead falling into decay and the sandstone blocks from the ruins of the homestead being used to construct a modern home at Flagstone Creek.

When George Clark secured the eastern portion of the Talgai run in 1865 the only structure on the land was an old shepherd's hut. It was under George Clark's direction that the grand East Talgai Homestead and its many outbuildings were erected.

The stone building situated near the entrance to Talgai was apparently built as a residence for the architect, Richard George Suter and his wife, during the construction of the homestead and the property's huge woolshed. This building later became a storehouse and residence for the station storekeeper.

Richard George Suter (1827–1894) trained as an architect in London under his father after completing a Bachelor of Arts at Trinity College at Cambridge in 1850. By 1865 Suter was working for Brisbane's leading architect Benjamin Backhouse while establishing his own practice. Suter was one of Queensland's most prolific and prominent architects of the late 19th century and was responsible for such grand designs as Jimbour House (Suter & Voysey 1873), St Mark's Church, Warwick (1867–70) and is recognised for his influence on the standard designs of schools in Queensland with the Board of Education using his designs almost exclusively until 1875. After a decline in his success, Suter moved to Melbourne in 1876 and became a priest for the Catholic Apostolic Church, where he died of heart disease in 1894.

Talgai Homestead was built of sandstone and covered sixty squares. The original roof was of shingles and the verandahs of hand and pit-sawn spotted gum, with cedar doors and architraves. Unlike the usual design for that period, the kitchen was attached to the main house.

George and Ellen Clark lived an affluent life at the grand East Talgai. The homestead was richly furnished and featured antique pieces which were probably a part of Ellen's dowry. George Clark was active in local affairs and Queensland politics, sitting on the Warwick Bench of Magistrates, holding an official position on the St. Mark's Church Committee as well as the Warwick School of Arts, the Warwick Hospital Committee and the Royal Agricultural Society. He also had a short- lived but very controversial period as a member of Queensland Parliament. During this time, he set up the "Warwick Examiner and Times" newspaper which was a pro-squatter vehicle and was constantly engaged in editorial clashes with the "Warwick Argus" established by James Morgan, the former Talgai manager and a staunch anti-squatter advocate.

George Clark was involved in accusations of collusion with the Survey Office in 1871, allegedly using his position to avoid the restrictions of the Land Act 1868 to acquire additional land for his East Talgai run.

During the 1860s and 1870s Talgai was becoming what was arguably the most successful sheep stud in Queensland producing immense amounts of quality merino wool and trading in high quality rams which were exported to Tasmania and Germany. Talgai peaked in its production during the 1880s when stock figures reached 20 000 sheep and 3000 Devon cattle.

Talgai Station was a fully developed self-contained estate village during the 1880s. It incorporated employee's cottages, a smithy, stables, barn, woolshed, slaughterhouse, dairy and school. Beside the Olive tree, which still remains today near the back gate of the property, George also constructed a stone chapel which was used for family worship but was never consecrated. This chapel was pulled down in 1942 as, according to George's son, George Carr Clark's will, the sandstone was to be used to construct a tower for St Mark's Church, Warwick, however this never came to pass. Talgai had three different watering systems which serviced the crops, the kitchen garden and formal English garden. Talgai also had vines of table grapes and an orchard of stone fruit.

It was in 1886 when a major anthropological discovery was made at Talgai. William Naish, fencing contractor, inadvertently discovered a skull where heavy rain had scoured out a creek bed. It was not until 1914 that Professor Edgeworth David, Professor of Archaeology at Sydney University on paying a visit to Talgai, presented a theory that the skull was 20,000 years old and provided a "missing link" in the evolutionary chain. Interest in the skull and the site at which it was found persisted until the 1960s, during which time the CSIRO and the Queensland Museum had conducted archaeological surveys at the site. Interest in the skull waned in the following decades as newer theories eclipsed those attached to the Talgai Skull. The original skull is housed at the Sydney Museum.

George Clark died in 1907 and the property passed to his son George Carr Clark at which time he sold-off 5000 acres of Talgai and purchased "Yanna" station on the Warrego River. About 2000 special stud ewes remained at Talgai and the stud sires were bred there and transferred to Yanna for fattening. Aberdeen Angus stud cattle were introduced to Talgai in 1916 and ultimately became the main business of Talgai.

In 1934 both the cattle and the sheep studs were sold at public auction, leaving about 750 acres on the homestead block around East Talgai house. George Carr Clark resided there with his wife and various family members until his death in 1942 when the entire property was sold.

Talgai was purchased by Harry and Jill Frizzell from the Bardwell family, eventually taking residence in 1965. They carried out extensive restoration and renovation work enabling all rooms of the homestead to be used. In 1968 Talgai was acquired by Mr and Mrs D Panton who added another residence and more renovations to the homestead. Talgai Homestead operated as a function and luxury accommodation centre but has since become a private residence of Rob and Eliza NIOA, Of NIOA Firearms

== Description ==
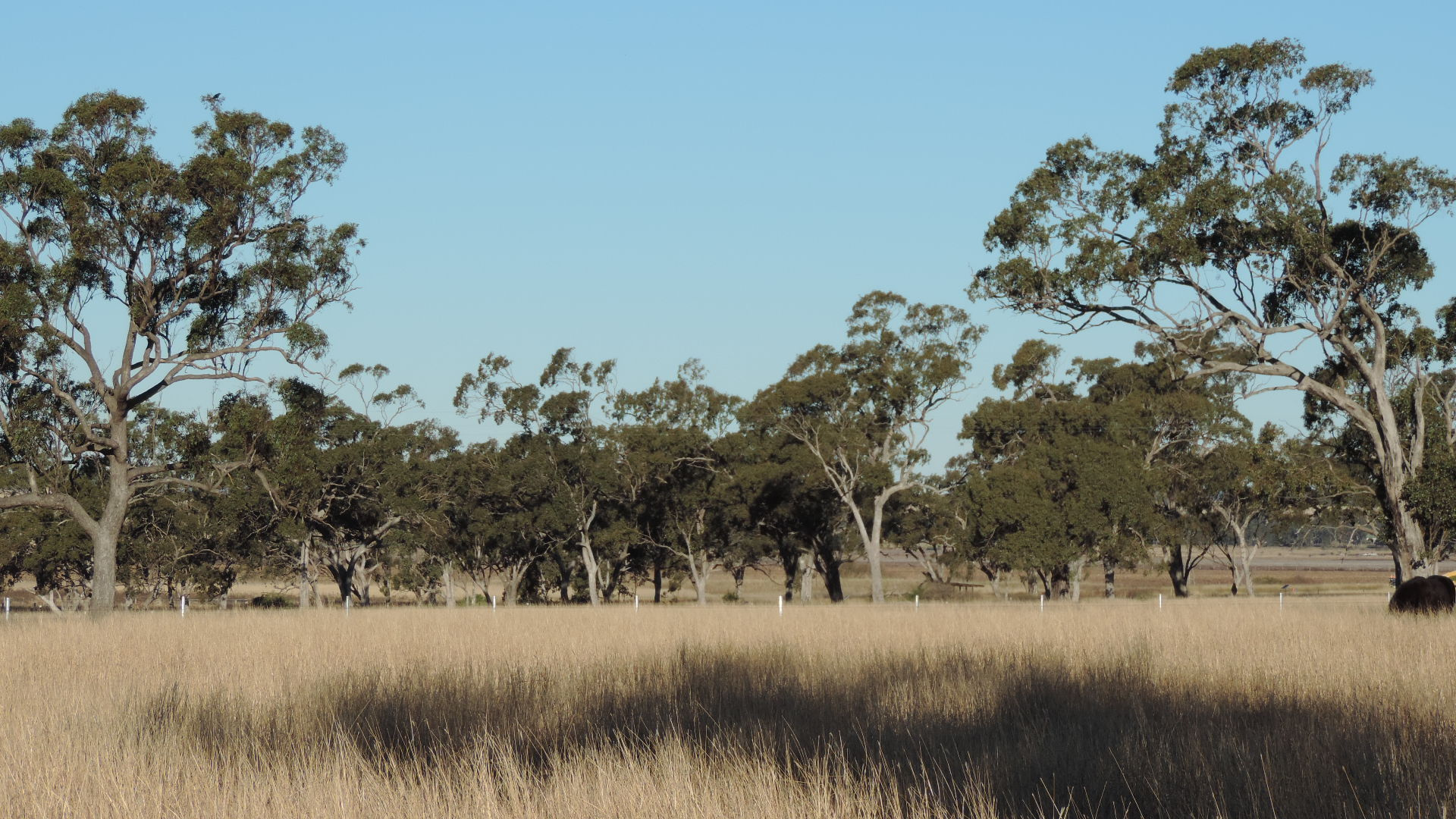
Talgai pastoral station, 2015

Talgai Homestead, located approximately 6 kilometres (3.7 mi) west of Allora on the Dalrymple Creek Road, consists of the homestead and grounds, an office/store and the remains of a stone weir on Dalrymple Creek. The homestead has views across a valley to the east.

The homestead is a large single-storeyed U-shaped sandstone building with a corrugated iron hipped roof and verandahs all round. The verandahs have lesser pitch skillion roofs, with the verandahs to the outer side of the building having paired round cast iron columns with timber capitals, and the verandahs fronting the courtyard having square timber posts. The sandstone ashlar is dressed around openings and has rock-faced finish to the outer verandah walls and picked finish to the courtyard walls. The building has seven rock-faced sandstone chimneystacks, and French doors with glass fanlights and sash windows open onto the verandahs from most rooms. The main entry is on the northern side and is accessed via a flight of stone steps with a timber arch between timber posts. The entry door assembly consists of a panelled cedar door with glass fanlight and sidelights with cedar framing.

The east elevation has a verandah with a deep central loggia created by the projection of the northern and southern wings beyond the east cross wing. This loggia has two pairs of cast iron columns, centrally located along the line of the verandah wall, supporting a timber truss beam. The ceiling to this space has timber boarding, raked at the sides, with a central pendant lamp. Each projecting wing has a square timber bay with sash windows to floor level.

The southern verandah of the northern wing has been enclosed with chamferboard, French doors and some glazing to accommodate service rooms off the kitchen, and the western end of this wing has notched stonework for the originally intended extension. The southern verandah of the southern wing has been enclosed with chamferboard and large areas of glazing along much of its length to accommodate sitting rooms and ensuite bathrooms for the adjacent guest rooms.

Internally, the ceilings are boarded and raked at the sides, and the building has rough rendered stone walls, panelled cedar doors and ornate timber fireplace surrounds. Circulation throughout the building is mainly via the verandahs, and the southern wing has been refitted as guest rooms. The eastern wing contains two sitting rooms, one of which houses a grand piano which is the only surviving original piece of furniture in the homestead. The northern wing contains a formal dining room at the eastern end adjacent to the main entry, and an informal dining room at the western end which has two skylights. An office and large kitchen are located in the midsection of the wing, and are accessed from the main entry via an arched doorway and corridor. A cellar with a concrete floor is located under the mid- section of the northern wing, and is accessed by a timber stair located in the southern verandah.

The grounds include a clay tennis court to the east of the homestead, an avenue of Bunya Pines to the south, and the remains of a sandstone slaughter house/acetylene store consisting of an L-shaped wall with two sash windows and a concrete floor to the west. A circle of sandstone blocks in the ground to the west of the courtyard may be the remains of a well. A gravel driveway enters the home paddock to the northeast of the homestead, and swings along the northern side bordering a pond with fountain to access a carpark to the west. A large Olive tree is located on the northern side of the kitchen, and a concrete water tank is situated adjacent to the western end of the northern wing. Palms are located either side of the entry pathway from the driveway.

Staff quarters are located to the northwest of the homestead. This single-storeyed building has a hipped corrugated iron roof and weatherboard cladding, and was originally the stables/carriage house. A large metal water tank (originally from a railway station) is located at the western end of the building.

A sandstone office/store is located to the north of the home paddock. This building has a corrugated iron gable roof, with an office at the southern end, store at the northern end and a basement located centrally. The office is accessed via a doorway on the eastern side, and has a boarded ceiling which is raked to the collar beam, timber floor, whitewashed walls, louvred windows, and a central fireplace on the southern side. The store is accessed from both east and west by double timber doors, and has exposed beams and rafters, earth floor, casement windows and a central raised timber platform, under which is located the basement. The basement is accessed via an external sandstone stair on the western side, and has ventilation slits on the eastern side and a stone flagged floor.

A timber cottage with a hipped corrugated iron roof and front verandah is located to the northeast of the office/store on the opposite side of the driveway. A shearing shed with a hipped corrugated iron roof is located to the east of the office/store.

The remains of a stone weir across Dalrymple Creek is located southeast of the homestead. The western side is extant, but the eastern side has been washed away. The line of the footings for the weir is visible in the stone embankment of the creek bed, and the remains of a water control mechanism is located at the western end. The property also has an airstrip to the south of the homestead.

== Heritage listing ==
Talgai Homestead was listed on the Queensland Heritage Register on 21 August 1992 having satisfied the following criteria.

The place is important in demonstrating the evolution or pattern of Queensland's history.

Talgai Homestead is important in demonstrating the evolution of Queensland's history as it reflects the earliest phase of pastoral settlement on the Darling Downs which significantly influenced the subsequent development of the region as the prime agricultural and pastoral region in Southeast Queensland. Talgai homestead also reflects the immense wealth that the early pastoralists were able to amass from wool production on the Darling Downs.

The place demonstrates rare, uncommon or endangered aspects of Queensland's cultural heritage.

Talgai Homestead is a rare surviving example of the early affluent development by squatters on the Darling Downs which was a feature of this pastoral district in the mid to late 19th century.

The place has potential to yield information that will contribute to an understanding of Queensland's history.

Talgai Homestead has the potential to yield information about Queensland's history due to the age and former complexity of the settlement. The scope for further archaeological discoveries, (similar to that of the Talgai Skull) and discoveries through historical research has realistic potential.

The place is important in demonstrating the principal characteristics of a particular class of cultural places.

Talgai Homestead is a good example of an affluent pastoral settlement demonstrating the principal characteristics of a 19th-century homestead complex.

The place is important because of its aesthetic significance.

Talgai Homestead has significant aesthetic value as a well composed substantial stone residence in a picturesque setting of landscaped gardens showing a high level of skilled design. The building's aesthetic significance draws largely on its contextual setting for the overall effect of balance.

The place has a special association with the life or work of a particular person, group or organisation of importance in Queensland's history.

The homestead has a special association with the life and work of prominent 19th architect R.G. Suter as a significant example of his work. It is also has a long association with the Clark family who established the station and homestead and who were an influential family in the evolution of the Darling Downs.
