= George Clark (Queensland politician) =

Australian politician

Member of the Queensland Legislative Assembly for Warwick
- In office 26 June 1867 – 23 September 1868
- Preceded by: Arnold Wienholt Sr.
- Succeeded by: Edmond Thornton

Personal details
- Born: George John Edwin Clark; 19 March 1834 Ross, Van Diemen's Land, Australia
- Died: 6 February 1907 (aged 72) Allora, Queensland, Australia
- Resting place: Allora Cemetery
- Spouse: Ellen Louisa Henrietta Smith
- Relations: Charles Clark (brother)
- Occupation: Bookkeeper, farmer

George John Edwin Clark (19 March 1834 – 6 February 1907) was an Australian farmer and politician.

== Early life ==
Born in Van Diemen's Land, he was educated in England at Camberwell Collegiate School.

== Pastoral life ==
In 1865 he settled in the Darling Downs in Queensland, where his older brother Charles had been living since 1861. In 1868 the brothers bought the Old Talgai sheep farming station, where George proved to be a very successful breeder of sheep.

In 1868, George Clark commissioned architect Richard George Suter to construct a grand homestead. Talgai Homestead is now listed on the Queensland Heritage Register.

== Political life ==
He served as in the Legislative Assembly of Queensland from 1867 to 1868 as the Member (MLA) for Warwick. The seat was later held from 1871 to 1873 by his brother Charles.

== Later life ==
Clark died in 1907 and was buried in Allora Cemetery.

Parliament of Queensland
Preceded by Arnold Wienholt Sr.	Member for Warwick; 1867–1868	Succeeded by Edmond Thornton
