= Arnold Wienholt Sr. =

Politician in Queensland, Australia

Arnold Wienholt Sr

Member of the Queensland Legislative Assembly for Warwick
- In office 10 June 1863 – 25 June 1867
- Preceded by: John Jones
- Succeeded by: George Clark

Personal details
- Born: Arnold Wienholt; 22 January 1826 Laugharne, Carmarthenshire, Wales
- Died: 16 January 1895 (aged 68) Locarno, Switzerland
- Relations: Edward Wienholt (brother); Arnold Wienholt (nephew)
- Occupation: Station Owner

Arnold Wienholt, senior, (22 January 1826 – 16 January 1895) was a politician in Queensland, Australia. He was a Member of the Queensland Legislative Assembly, representing Warwick from 10 June 1863 to 25 June 1867. Wienholt was born in Laugharne, Wales and arrived in Australia c. 1847. His brother Edward Wienholt was also a Member of the Queensland Legislative Assembly and a landowner.

Parliament of Queensland
| Preceded by John Jones | Member for Warwick; 1863–1867 | Succeeded by George Clark |
