= Camberwell Collegiate School =

Coordinates: 51.4697°N 0.0859°W

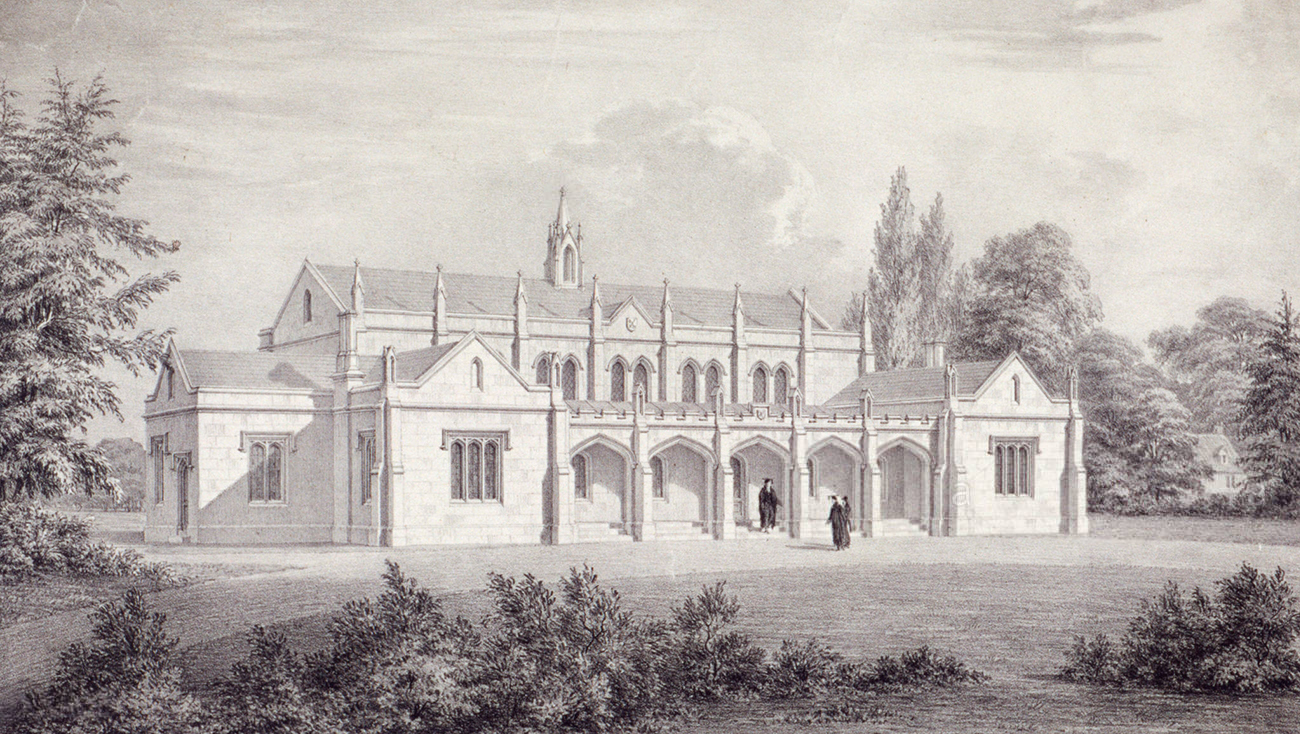
- Camberwell Collegiate School (lithograph by Frederick Mackenzie, 1834)
- Camberwell, London; England

Information
- Religious affiliation: Anglicanism
- Established: 1835
- Closed: 1867
- Affiliation: King's College London

The Camberwell Collegiate School was a private school in Camberwell, London, England. It was located on the eastern side of Camberwell Grove, directly opposite the Grove Chapel.

The school was opened in 1835 as an Anglican school under the patronage of the Bishop of Winchester and with the support of J. G. Storie, the vicar of the nearby St Giles' Church. It was affiliated with King's College London, which had been established as an Anglican alternative to the secular University College London. The council of King's College offered an annual prize for the school's best pupil.

The Collegiate School was situated on a two-acre site laid out as a pleasure ground and flower gardens, and housed in a purpose-built building constructed the previous year to the designs of Henry Roberts, who had also designed the Fishmongers' Hall. Built at a cost of about £3,600 in white brick with stone dressings, and incorporating some aspects of Tudor style, it had a frontage of 300 feet, and was notable for the cloister which formed the centre of its entrance front.

The building included an entrance hall, a library, three classrooms, the master's accommodation, and a schoolroom designed to accommodate 200 boys. The large schoolroom was 60 feet long, 33 feet wide, and its 20-foot height was topped by a lantern with pinnacles.

The Collegiate School had some success for a while, leading to the closure for some decades of the Denmark Hill Grammar School. However, it had difficulty competing with other nearby schools, including Dulwich College, and was closed in 1867. The school was demolished the same year, and the land was sold for building.

== Headmasters ==
In 1834, John Allen Giles was appointed to the headmastership, but on 24 November 1836 was elected headmaster of the City of London School. Rev. Robert Eden was appointed as headmaster in 1837.

The headmaster in 1840 was Rev Joseph Sumnner Brockhurst, a graduate of St John's College, Cambridge, whose poem, Venice, had won the Chancellor's Gold Medal in 1826. He left in 1840, the year after the death of his wife.

From 1860 to 1863, the head was Rev. Frederick Aubert Gace.

== Notable pupils ==
- Sir Francis Barry, 1st Baronet (1825–1907), Conservative MP for Windsor
- George Edmund Street (1825–1907), architect
- James Conway Brown, musician (1838–1908)
- The brothers Charles Clark (1832–1896) and George Clark (1834–1907), both Australian politicians
