= Talgai Skull =

Hominin fossil

Front and side view of the Talgai Skull.

The Talgai Skull is a human fossil found on the Talgai Station, near Allora, Southern Downs Region, Queensland, Australia. It has been dated indirectly, based on the radiocarbon date of a carbonate nodule found in stratigraphic proximity, at 13,500 years old.

== History ==
The Talgai Skull was discovered in 1886 on Talgai Homestead, as the first fossil evidence of early human occupation in the area. It was found by fencing contractor, William Naish. It had been embedded in the wall of Dalrymple Creek, which had been scoured out by heavy rain. In 1896 the skull was sent to Sydney where it was examined by the trustees of the Australian Museum. The museum was interested in purchasing the fossil but could not agree on an acceptable price. Eventually the skull was returned to its owner. It remained at the homestead until 1914 when Professor Edgeworth David, Professor of Archaeology at Sydney University visited Talgai and presented a theory that the skull was 20,000 years old and provided a "missing link" in the evolutionary chain. This sudden change in attitude towards the skull was motivated in part by the recent "discovery" of the Piltdown Man fossils in England. Although later proven to be hoax, the Piltdown find encouraged others to search for similar evidence of early man. CSIRO and the Queensland Museum conducted archaeological surveys at the site.

Severe cracks in the skull led some observers to conclude that a blow to the head had been the cause of death. However, later investigation showed that the cracks were produced by expansion and contraction of the clay soil where the skull was found.

The original skull is housed at the Sydney Museum. In 1968 the Australian Broadcasting Commission made an award-winning documentary about the skull called The Talgai Skull.
