= Jacob Horwitz =

Australian politician

Member of the Queensland Legislative Assembly for Warwick
- In office 19 November 1878 – 2 July 1887
- Preceded by: James Morgan
- Succeeded by: Arthur Morgan

Personal details
- Born: Jacob Horwitz; 1830 East Prussia, Kingdom of Prussia
- Died: 24 March 1920 (aged 89-90) Berlin, Germany
- Occupation: Shopkeeper, Flour miller

Jacob Horwitz (or Horowitz) (1830 – 24 March 1920) was a politician in Queensland, Australia. He was a Member of the Queensland Legislative Assembly.

== Early life ==
Horwitz was born in 1830 in East Prussia (now part of Poland). Together with his brother, he ran the Exchange Store general store in the town of Warwick, and owned the local Ellenthorpe Flour Mill.

== Politics ==
Horwitz began public life as Mayor of Warwick from 1876 to 1878. He resigned in 1878 to successfully contest the seat of Warwick in the Queensland Legislative Assembly. A member of the Liberal party, Horwitz was elected to the seat in 1878, defeating James Morgan who was dying from an injury sustained some months earlier. Horwitz served two terms as member for the district from 1878 to 1887. In February 1887, he embarked on a trip to Europe. Despite some pressure, he did not initially resign his seat in parliament; but in June 1887 he sent a cablegram from London announcing his resignation. A by-election was held on 2 July 1887, which was won by Independent candidate Arthur Morgan (son of James Morgan) who later became Premier of Queensland.

== Later life ==
Horwitz was a prominent philanthropist in the Darling Downs region, including gifting £7500 to the Warwick General Hospital for the creation of a new ward.

He died in Berlin on 24 March 1920.

Parliament of Queensland
Preceded by James Morgan	Member for Warwick; 1878–1887	Succeeded by Arthur Morgan
