= Electoral district of Warwick =

Former state electoral district of Queensland, Australia

Warwick Queensland—Legislative Assembly
- State: Queensland
- Created: 1860
- Abolished: 2001
- Namesake: Warwick, Queensland

Warwick was an electoral district of the Legislative Assembly in the Australian state of Queensland from 1860 to 2001. It centred on the town of Warwick.

The electorate was represented by two Premiers: Arthur Morgan and Thomas Joseph Byrnes. It was also the seat of former Opposition Leader Lawrence Springborg.

== Members for Warwick ==
| Member | Party | Term |
|---|---|---|
| St. George Richard Gore | | 1860–1862 |
| John Gore Jones | | 1862–1863 |
| Arnold Wienholt, Sr. | | 1863–1867 |
| George Clark | | 1867–1868 |
| Edmond Thornton | | 1868–1870 |
| James Morgan | | 1870–1871 |
| Charles Clark | | 1871–1873 |
| James Morgan | | 1873–1878 |
| Jacob Horwitz | Liberal | 1878–1887 |
| Arthur Morgan | Independent | 1887–1890 |
| Arthur Morgan | Opposition | 1890–1896 |
| Thomas Joseph Byrnes | Ministerial | 1896–1898 |
| Arthur Morgan | Ministerial | 1898–1903 |
| Arthur Morgan | Liberal | 1903–1906 |
| Thomas O'Sullivan | Liberal | 1906–1907 |
| Thomas O'Sullivan | Kidstonites | 1907–1908 |
| George Powell Barnes | Farmers' Rep. | 1908–1909 |
| George Powell Barnes | Liberal | 1909–1917 |
| George Powell Barnes | National | 1917–1922 |
| George Powell Barnes | United | 1922–1925 |
| George Powell Barnes | Country and Progressive National | 1925–1935 |
| John Healy | Labor | 1935–1947 |
| Otto Madsen | Country | 1947–1963 |
| David Cory | Country | 1963–1975 |
| David Cory | National Country | 1975–1977 |
| Des Booth | National Country | 1977–1982 |
| Des Booth | National | 1982–1992 |
| Lawrence Springborg | National | 1992–2001 |

== See also ==
- Electoral districts of Queensland
- Members of the Queensland Legislative Assembly by year
- Category:Members of the Queensland Legislative Assembly by name
