= Charles Clark (Australian politician) =

Australian politician

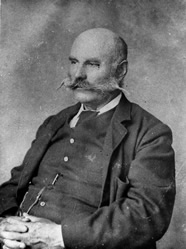

Member of the Queensland Legislative Assembly for Warwick
- In office 21 July 1871 – 10 November 1873
- Preceded by: James Morgan
- Succeeded by: James Morgan

Personal details
- Born: Charles George Henry Carr Clark; 25 May 1832 Ross, Van Diemen's Land, Australia
- Died: 16 September 1896 (aged 64) Tenterfield, New South Wales, Australia
- Resting place: Tenterfield Cemetery
- Spouse(s): Phyllis Seal (m.1858 d.1874), Amy Ralph (m.1877)
- Relations: George Clark (brother)
- Occupation: Grazier

Charles George Henry Carr Clark (1832–1896) was an Australian politician. He was a Member of the Queensland Legislative Assembly.

== Early life ==
Born in Van Diemen's Land, he was educated in England at Camberwell Collegiate School.

In 1861 he settled in the Darling Downs in Queensland, where he and his brother George established a successful sheep farm.

== Politics ==
Clark served as in the Legislative Assembly of Queensland from 1871 to 1873 as the Member (MLA) for Warwick. The seat had been held from 1867 to 1868 by his brother George.

== Later life ==
Clark died in 1896 and was buried in Tenterfield Cemetery.

Parliament of Queensland
Preceded by James Morgan	Member for Warwick; 1871–1873	Succeeded by James Morgan
