= Warwick Argus =

Newspaper in Warwick, Queensland, Australia

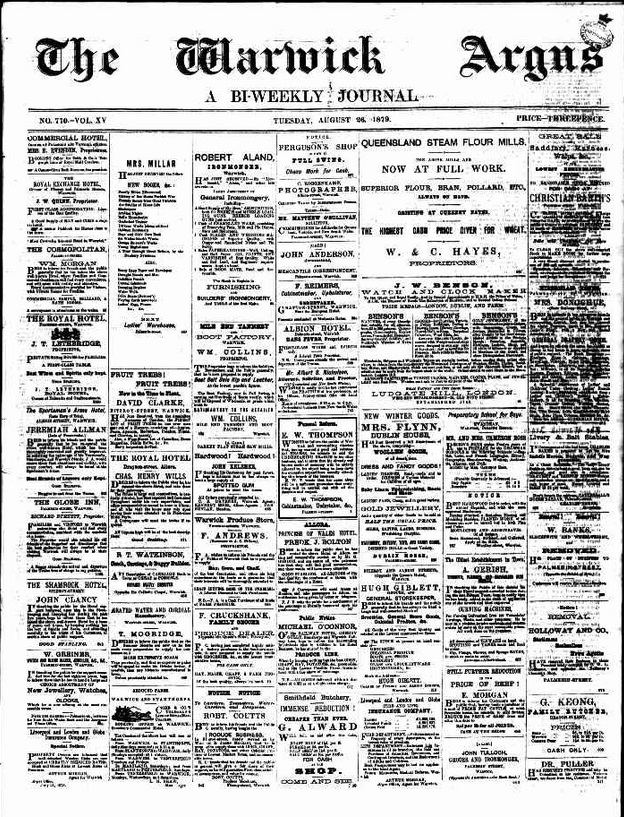
- Warwick Argus front page 26 August 1879
- Owner(s): Andrew Dunn
- Editor: William Dunn
- Founded: 1879
- Language: English
- Ceased publication: 1919
- Headquarters: Warwick, Queensland
- ISSN: 1839-6836

The Warwick Argus was a newspaper published in Warwick, Queensland, Australia from 1879 to 1919.

== History ==
The Warwick Argus was preceded by the Warwick Argus and Tenterfield Chronicle published between November 1864 and 21 August 1879.

The Warwick Argus was first published on Tuesday 26 August 1879, as a bi-weekly newspaper published on Tuesdays and Saturdays.

Later it was published three times a week.

Andrew Dunn bought the Warwick Argus in 1914 and installed his son William Dunn as editor. The last issue was published on 31 January 1919.

It was subsequently merged with the Warwick Examiner and Times to create the Warwick Daily News.

== Digitisation ==
Issues of the Warwick Argus and Tenterfield Chronicle from 1866 to 1869 and from 1874 to 1879 and of the Warwick Argus from 1879 to 1901 have been digitised and made available online as part of the National Library of Australia's Newspaper Digitisation Project.
