= List of sites on the Queensland Heritage Register in Warwick =

There are a number of sites on the Queensland Heritage Register in Warwick. These include:

| Place ID | Image | Listed place | Address | Coordinates | Notes |
|---|---|---|---|---|---|
| 600947 | | St Mark's Anglican Church | 55 Albion Street | 28.2160°S 152.0345°E | |
| 601505 | | Glennie Hall | 66 Albion Street | 28°13′05″S 152°02′06″E | |
| 600525 | | Canning Downs Homestead | Canning Downs | 28°13′22″S 152°03′27″E | |
| 600944 | | The Commonage | 69A Dragon Street | 28°13′07″S 152°01′37″E | |
| 600945 | | Pringle Cottage | 81 Dragon Street | 28°13′13″S 152°01′36″E | |
| 600946 | | Warwick War Memorial | Fitzroy Street | 28°12′46″S 152°01′55″E | |
| 600947 | | Warwick East State School | 45 Fitzroy Street | 28°12′52″S 152°02′21″E | |
| 601725 | | Plumb's Chambers | 82 & 84 Fitzroy Street | 28°12′51″S 152°01′55″E | |
| 600948 | | Warwick Court House | 88 Fitzroy Street | 28°12′51″S 152°01′52″E | |
| 600950 | | National Hotel | 35 Grafton Street | 28°13′00″S 152°02′23″E | |
| 601756 | | Tulloch's Central Stores | 110–114 Grafton Street | 28°12′58″S 152°01′52″E | |
| 601757 | | Warwick Uniting Church | 37 Guy Street (corner of Fitzroy Street) | 28°12′50″S 152°01′49″E | |
| 600951 | | Residence, 50 Guy Street | 50 Guy Street | 28°13′01″S 152°01′50″E | |
| 600952 | | St George's Masonic Centre | 50A Guy Street | 28°13′01″S 152°01′50″E | |
| 602497 | | Warwick Central State School | 55B Guy Street | 28°13′03″S 152°01′45″E | |
| 600954 | | Assembly Hall | 8 Locke Street | 28°13′34″S 152°01′40″E | |
| 600953 | | Our Lady of Assumption Convent | 8 Locke Street | 28°13′03″S 152°02′28″E | |
| 600955 | | Warwick railway station | Lyons Street | 28°13′03″S 152°02′28″E | |
| 602076 | | T J Byrnes Monument | Palmerin Street | 28°12′58″S 152°01′57″E | |
| 650062 | | Warwick State High School | Palmerin Street | 28.2105°S 152.0329°E | |
| 600960 | | Johnson's Building | 64–70 Palmerin Street | 28°12′54″S 152°01′59″E | |
| 600961 | | Warwick Town Hall | 72 Palmerin Street | 28°12′56″S 152°02′00″E | |
| 600962 | | Criterion Hotel | 84 Palmerin Street | 28°12′56″S 152°02′00″E | |
| 600956 | | Barnes and Co. Trading Place (aka Smith & Miller building) | 118 Palmerin Street | 28°13′03″S 152°01′58″E | |
| 600957 | | Langham Hotel | 133 Palmerin Street | 28°13′01″S 152°01′55″E | |
| 602585 | | St Mary's Presbytery | 142 Palmerin Street | 28°13′08″S 152°01′58″E | |
| 600958 | | First St. Mary's Roman Catholic Church, Warwick | 163 Palmerin Street | 28°13′09″S 152°01′53″E | |
| 600959 | | Second St Mary's Roman Catholic Church, Warwick | 163 Palmerin Street | 28°13′09″S 152°01′53″E | |
| 602199 | | Oddfellows Home Hotel | Wantley Street | 28°13′09″S 152°01′31″E | |
| 600942 | | Hillside, Warwick | 25 Weewondilla Road | 28°12′13″S 152°01′45″E | |
| 602152 | | Warwick General Cemetery | Wentworth Street | 28°12′36″S 152°00′12″E | |
| 601772 | | Aberfoyle, Warwick | 35 Wood Street | 28°13′13″S 152°02′05″E | |
