= Warwick (disambiguation) =

Warwick is the county town of Warwickshire, England.

Warwick may also refer to:

== Places ==
=== Australia ===
- Warwick, Queensland, a town
- Warwick, Western Australia, a suburb of Perth

=== Bermuda ===
- Warwick Parish, a parish
  - Warwick Camp (Bermuda), a British Army base

=== Canada ===
- Warwick, Alberta
- Warwick, Ontario, village and township in Lambton County
- Warwick, Quebec, a town
- Warwick Mountain, Alberta

=== England ===
- Warwick District, a local government district of Warwickshire
- Warwick Bridge, a village in Cumbria
- Warwick-on-Eden, Cumbria

=== New Zealand ===
- Warwick, an area of the town of Feilding

=== United Kingdom ===
- Warwick (UK Parliament constituency), a former constituency in Warwickshire, England

=== United States ===
- Warwick, Delaware, an unincorporated community
- Warwick, Georgia, a city
- Warwick, Maryland, an unincorporated community
- Warwick, Massachusetts, a town
- Warwick, New York, a town
  - Warwick (village), New York, a village
- Warwick, North Dakota, a city
- Warwick, Oklahoma, a town
- Warwick, Pennsylvania, an unincorporated community
- Warwick, Rhode Island, a city
- Warwick, Virginia, a former independent city, now part of Newport News
- Warwick, Virginia (Chesterfield County), an unincorporated town and port
- Warwick, West Virginia, an unincorporated community
- Warwick Township (disambiguation)

== People and fictional characters ==
- Warwick (given name), a list of people and fictional characters
- Warwick (surname), a list of people
- Earl of Warwick, title in the English Peerage, including a list of title-holders

== Businesses ==
- Warwick (car), a British small production car company
- Warwick (guitar manufacturer), a German bass guitar manufacturer
- Warwick Hotel (disambiguation)
- Warwick Records (United Kingdom), a record label
- Warwick Records (United States), a record label
- Warwick Films, a British film production company
- Warwick's, American bookstore

== Other uses ==
- Vickers Warwick, a Second World War RAF patrol aircraft
- University of Warwick, Coventry, West Midlands, England
  - Radio Warwick, at the University of Warwick
- Warwick Airport (disambiguation)
- Warwick station (disambiguation)

== See also ==
- Warwick and Leamington (UK Parliament constituency), in Warwickshire, England
- Warwick Bridge, a village in Cumbria, England
- Warwicksland, Cumbria, England in the List of United Kingdom locations: Wam-Way
- Warwickshire, a county in England
