= Warwick Hotel =

Warwick Hotel may refer to:

- National Hotel, Warwick, a heritage-listed hotel at 35 Grafton Street, Warwick, Queensland, Australia
- Langham Hotel, Warwick, a heritage-listed hotel at 133 Palmerin Street, Warwick, Queensland, Australia
- Criterion Hotel, Warwick, a heritage-listed hotel at 84 Palmerin Street in Warwick, Queensland, Australia
- Warwick Hotel (Toronto), a hotel in Toronto, Ontario, Canada
- The Warwick, a historic hotel in the Rittenhouse Square neighborhood of Philadelphia, Pennsylvania, US
- Warwick New York Hotel, a luxury hotel in Midtown Manhattan, New York City, US
- Warwick Hotels and Resorts, a global hospitality company headquartered in New York, US
- Hotel Warwick, a historic hotel building in Newport News, Virginia, US
- Warwick Allerton - Chicago, a hotel skyscraper in Chicago, Illinois, US
