= Warwick Township, Pennsylvania =

Warwick Township is the name of three places in Pennsylvania, USA:

- Warwick Township, Bucks County, Pennsylvania
- Warwick Township, Chester County, Pennsylvania
- Warwick Township, Lancaster County, Pennsylvania

== See also ==
- Warwick Township (disambiguation)
