= Warrick =

Warrick may refer to:

== People ==
=== Given name ===
- Warrick Brown, fictional character on CSI: Crime Scene Investigation
- Warrick Brownlow-Pike (born 1985), British puppeteer
- Warrick L. Carter (1942–2017), music educator
- Warrick Couch (born 1954), Australian astronomer
- Warrick Dunn (born 1975), American football running back
- Warrick Fynn, South African cricketer
- Warrick Gelant, rugby character
- Warrick Giddey, Australian basketball player
- Warrick Holdman (born 1975), American football linebacker
- Warrick Palmateer (born 1969), Australian artist
- Warrick Scheffer, darts player
- Warrick Sony (born 1958)

=== Surname ===
- Bryan Warrick (born 1959), American basketball player
- Cynthia Warrick, American academic administrator
- Delia Juanita Warrick (1942 – 2008), American soul singer
- Douglas Warrick, Oregon State University assistant professor
- Earl L. Warrick (1911–2002) chemist
- Frank Warrick (1944–2021), Australian journalist
- Hakim Warrick (born 1982), American basketball player
- Harley Warrick, American barn painter - noted for Mail Pouch tobacco signs
- J. K. Warrick (born 1945), minister and general superintendent in the Church of the Nazarene
- Joby Warrick, (born August 4, 1960) American author, Pulitzer Prize-winning journalist
- Kevin Warrick, American golfer
- Marie Dionne Warrick (born 1940) American singer, actress, TV-show host and United Nations Global Ambassador
- Meta Vaux Warrick Fuller (1877–1956), born Meta Vaux Warrick, American Afrocentric artist
- Patricia S. Warrick (1925–2023), American academic, science fiction editor
- Peter Warrick (born 1977), American football wide receiver
- Dr. Richard J. Warrick (December 29, 1880 - December 17, 1957), American co-founder of Sigma Pi Phi and former United States Civil Service examiner
- Ruth Warrick (1915–2005), American singer, actress and activist
- Wicket W. Warrick, Star Wars character

== Other uses ==
- USS Warrick, cargo ship of the United States Navy
- Warrick County, Indiana, United States
  - Warrick Area Transit System
  - Warrick County School Corporation, a public school-governing body
  - Warrick Power Plant
- Warrick House (Meadow Grove, Nebraska)

== See also ==
- Warrack (surname)
- Warwick (disambiguation)
