= Warrack =

Warrack is a surname. Notable people with the surname include:

- Allan Warrack (born 1937), Canadian politician
- Grace Harriet Warrack (1855–1932), Scottish editor and translator
- Guy Warrack (1900–1986), Scottish composer and conductor
- Harriet Warrack (c. 1825–1910), Scottish school founder and headmistress
- John Warrack (born 1928), English music critic and oboist

== See also ==
- Warrick (disambiguation)
- Warwick (surname)
