= Warwick (surname) =

Warwick is a habitational surname derived from the English town of the same name. It may refer to the following people:

- Carl Warwick (1937–2025), American baseball outfielder
- Carl Warwick (musician) (1917–2003), American jazz trumpeter
- Cathy Warwick (born 1968), English chess player and writer
- Cathy Warwick (midwife), Scottish midwife, trade union leader, and abortion rights activist
- Charles F. Warwick (1852–1913), American author, lawyer, and politician
- Christopher Warwick, American politician
- Clint Warwick (1940–2004), English musician
- Derek Warwick (born 1954), British Formula One driver
- Diana Warwick, Baroness Warwick of Undercliffe (born 1945), British Labour politician and life peer
- Dionne Warwick (born 1940), American singer
- Dee Dee Warwick (1945–2008), American singer
- Eden Warwick, pen name of the author of Nasology, parody nose classification
- Ernest Warwick (1918–2009), British author and prisoner of war
- Ernest Warwick (boxer) (1904–1986), British boxer
- Ethel Warwick (1882–1951), British stage actress
- James Warwick (actor) (born 1947), English actor
- Joan Warwick (1898–1973), English croquet and hockey player
- John Warwick (disambiguation) – multiple people
- Joseph Warwick Bigger (1891–1951), Irish politician and academic
- Keith Warwick (born 1975), Scottish actor and musician
- Kevin Warwick (born 1954), British scientist and cyberneticist
- Kim Warwick (born 1952), Australian tennis player
- Lonnie Warwick (1942–2024), American football player
- Lyn Warwick (born 1946), Australian politician
- Mildred Warwick (1922–2006), Canadian baseball player
- Norman Warwick (1920–1994), British cinematographer
- Nurham O. Warwick (1940–2020), American politician
- Paul Warwick (disambiguation) – multiple people
- Richard Warwick (1945–1997), English actor
- Richard Turner-Warwick (1925–2020), British urologist
- Ricky Warwick (born 1966), the frontman for the Scottish band The Almighty
- Robert Warwick (1878–1964), American actor
- Septimus Warwick (1881–1953), British architect
- Virginia Warwick (1903–?), American actress
