= Residence, 50 Guy Street, Warwick =

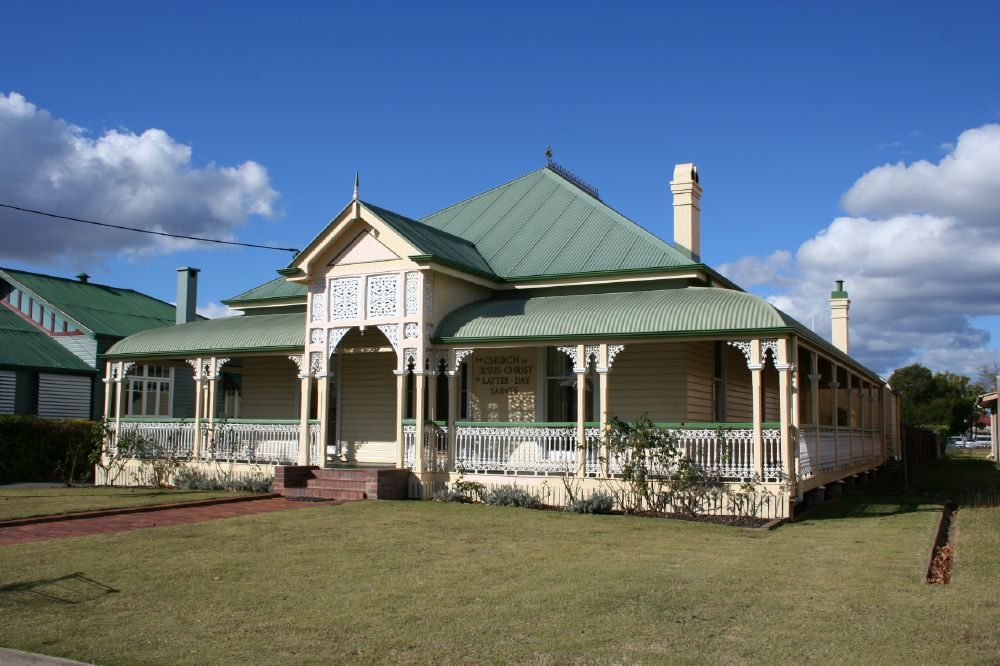
- Church of Jesus Christ of Latter Day Saints, 2015

- Location within Queensland Location within Australia
- 28.2169°S 152.0305°E
- Location: 50 Guy Street, Warwick, Southern Downs Region, Queensland, Australia

History
- Design period: 1870s–1890s (late 19th century)
- Built: c. 1891

Queensland Heritage Register
- Official name: Residence
- Type: state heritage (built)
- Designated: 21 October 1992
- Reference no.: 600951
- Significant period: 1890s circa (fabric, historical)
- Significant components: residential accommodation – main house

Residence is a heritage-listed detached house at 50 Guy Street, Warwick, Southern Downs Region, Queensland, Australia. It was built c. 1891. It was added to the Queensland Heritage Register on 21 October 1992. It is currently used as a church by The Church of Jesus Christ of Latter Day Saints.

== History ==
The residence situated at 50 Guy Street, Warwick was constructed for Francis Vaudeville Douyere, a local merchant, and son of Wellmand and Bridget (Bessie) Douyere

Warwick was established as an administrative centre of the emerging Darling Downs regions in 1847, with a post office being established in the town in 1848. This year saw the first survey work of the embryonic town completed by surveyor, James Charles Burnett, with further surveys in 1850, and the first sale of crown land in July 1850. On 25 May 1861, Warwick was granted the status of a municipality (the Borough of Warwick), and discussions soon after for the introduction of the Southern railway line which was in elementary stages of planning in Queensland.

The property, being 1 rood 35 perches, on which the house was constructed was acquired by Deed of Grant by William Tidman of Ipswich in September 1860, and transferred the following year to Henry Clinton of Main Range, and then to Arnold Weinholt of Maryvale in June 1862. Elizabeth Bridget Douyere, a widow, acquired the property in July 1880 and on her death on 26 August 1882 the property was left to Francis Vaudeville Douyere and Diamantina Douyere (Francis's sister). The Warwick rate books for this period indicate that a house, valued at £35 was indeed on the property from 1888. These books show that Francis Vaudeville Douyere who is variously described as a draper, grocer and storeman both dwelt in and owned the property from 1891, when its value increased from £35 to £150. This sudden rise in value seems to indicate that a house may have been constructed in this year.

William Kennedy Hyslop acquired the property at 50 Guy Street in May 1903 and retained it until November 1929 when the property was transferred to his wife, Mary Maria Hyslop. 50 Guy Street passed from the Hyslop family in February 1940 after the death of Mary Hyslop, when it was transferred to Alice May Charles. It changed hands many times and then, in 1985, was purchased by the Corporation of the Presiding Bishop of The Church of Jesus Christ of Latter-day Saints. To accommodate the auditorium of the church in the residence internal walls were removed to turn three rooms on the north of the central hallway into a small auditorium.

== Description ==
The former residence at 50 Guy Street is a one storeyed timber building with simple rectangular plan and encircled by verandahs on three sides. The building, which is slightly elevated from the ground level on short timber posts, is timber framed and clad externally with horizontal chamfered timber boards. The hipped roof of the building is clad with sheets of corrugated iron. The verandahs, on the principal facade to the east and on the northern and southern facades of the building have a bull nose curved corrugated iron awning supported on paired timber columns with decorative cast iron brackets. The verandahs are lined with cast iron balustrading.

Centrally located on the symmetrically arranged eastern facade of the building is the entrance door which is emphasised with a gable projecting from the main roof and projecting above the verandah line of the building. The gable features a triangular pediment supported on paired timber posts, projecting forward from those supporting the verandah, and these are infilled below the pediment to the level of the verandah line with timber fretwork panels. The principal entrance, a four panelled unpainted timber door, with the upper panels removed and glazed substituted for the panelling.

Internally the former residence is planned around a central hall from the front door which terminates at a rear deck on the western side of the building. All the major rooms of the building are accessed on either side of this hallway, which features a silky oak round headed archway about mid way along its length. The four panelled timber doors providing access to the internal rooms from the hallway have transom openings above, infilled with timber fretwork panels.

== Heritage listing ==
Residence was listed on the Queensland Heritage Register on 21 October 1992 having satisfied the following criteria.

The place is important in demonstrating the evolution or pattern of Queensland's history.

The residence at 50 Guy Street demonstrates the growth of Warwick at about the turn of the century, and also, more recently, the spread of American Christian religions to regional areas of Queensland.

The place is important because of its aesthetic significance.

The house is a well-composed Victorian timber building which contributes to the Guy Street streetscape.
