= Warwick station (disambiguation) =

Warwick railway station is a railway station in Warwick, Warwickshire, England.

Warwick station or Warwick railway station may also refer to:

== England ==
- Warwick Parkway railway station, a railway station in Warwick, Warwickshire, England
- Warwick (Milverton) railway station, a former railway station in Leamington Spa, Warwickshire, England
- Warwick Road railway station, a former name for what is now Old Trafford tram stop in Greater Manchester, England
- Warwick Avenue tube station, a London Underground station in London, England

== Australia ==
- Warwick railway station, Queensland, a railway station in Warwick, Queensland, Australia
- Warwick railway station, Perth, a railway station in Warwick, Western Australia
- Warwick Farm railway station, a railway station in Sydney, Australia
- Warwick Farm Racecourse railway station, a former railway station in New South Wales, Australia

== See also ==
- Warwick (disambiguation)
