= The Commonage =

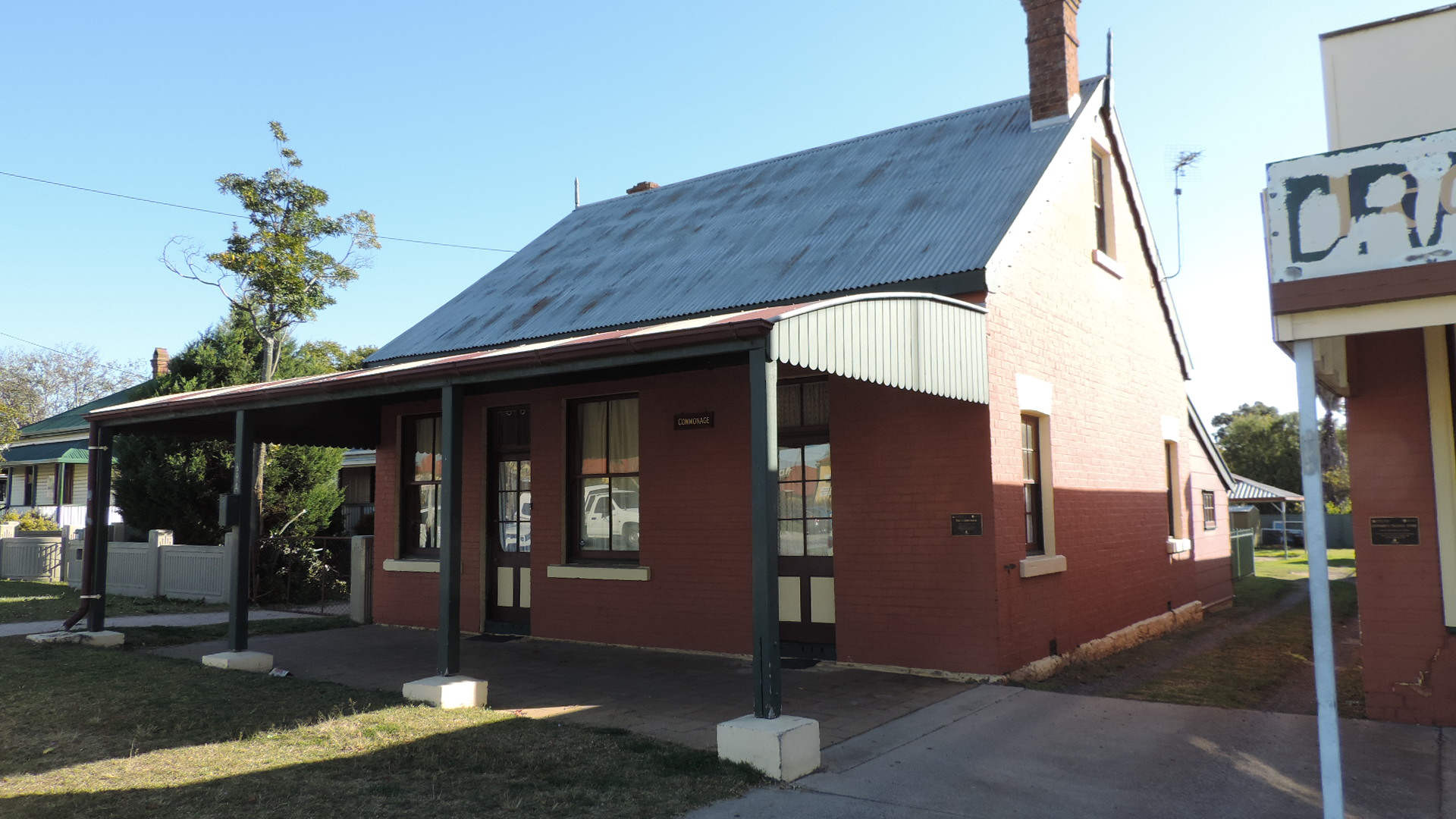
- The Commonage, 2015

- Location within Queensland Location within Australia
- 28.2187°S 152.027°E
- Location: 69A Dragon Street, Warwick, Southern Downs Region, Queensland, Australia

History
- Design period: 1870s–1890s (late 19th century)
- Built: c. 1870
- Built for: John Leonard

Queensland Heritage Register
- Official name: The Commonage
- Type: state heritage (built)
- Designated: 21 October 1992
- Reference no.: 600944
- Significant period: 1870s (fabric, historical)
- Significant components: residential accommodation – main house, attic

The Commonage is a heritage-listed cottage at 69A Dragon Street, Warwick, Southern Downs Region, Queensland, Australia. It was built c. 1870. It was added to the Queensland Heritage Register on 21 October 1992.

== History ==
Evidence indicates that this brick cottage, known as the Commonage, was erected during the late 1860s or early 1870s for John Leonard of Warwick.

Warwick was established as an administrative centre in 1847, and a post office established there in January 1848. From late 1848 an embryonic town was emerging, and surveyor James Charles Burnett made an initial survey of the town of Warwick in March 1848. Burnett undertook further survey work in April 1850 and the first sale of crown land in Warwick took place on 31 July 1850. By 1859 Warwick was recognised as a major urban centre on the Darling Downs, and on 25 May 1861 Warwick was proclaimed a municipality (the Borough of Warwick) under the 1858 Municipalities Act (NSW). The municipal boundary followed the original Warwick Town Reserve of five square miles. At the first Queensland census taken in April 1861 the town of Warwick recorded 241 houses (34 of which were either uninhabited or unfinished).

The allotment on which the cottage is located was acquired by Isaac Bennett in 1862, and transferred to Leonard, then described as a carrier, in 1863. The 1868 Warwick Post Office Directory records Leonard's address as Albion Street, however by 1874 Leonard's address was given in the Directory as the Commonage.

The building appears to have been erected as a residence and shop for Leonard, who was subsequently listed as a shopkeeper. The building included two street entrances and large front windows.

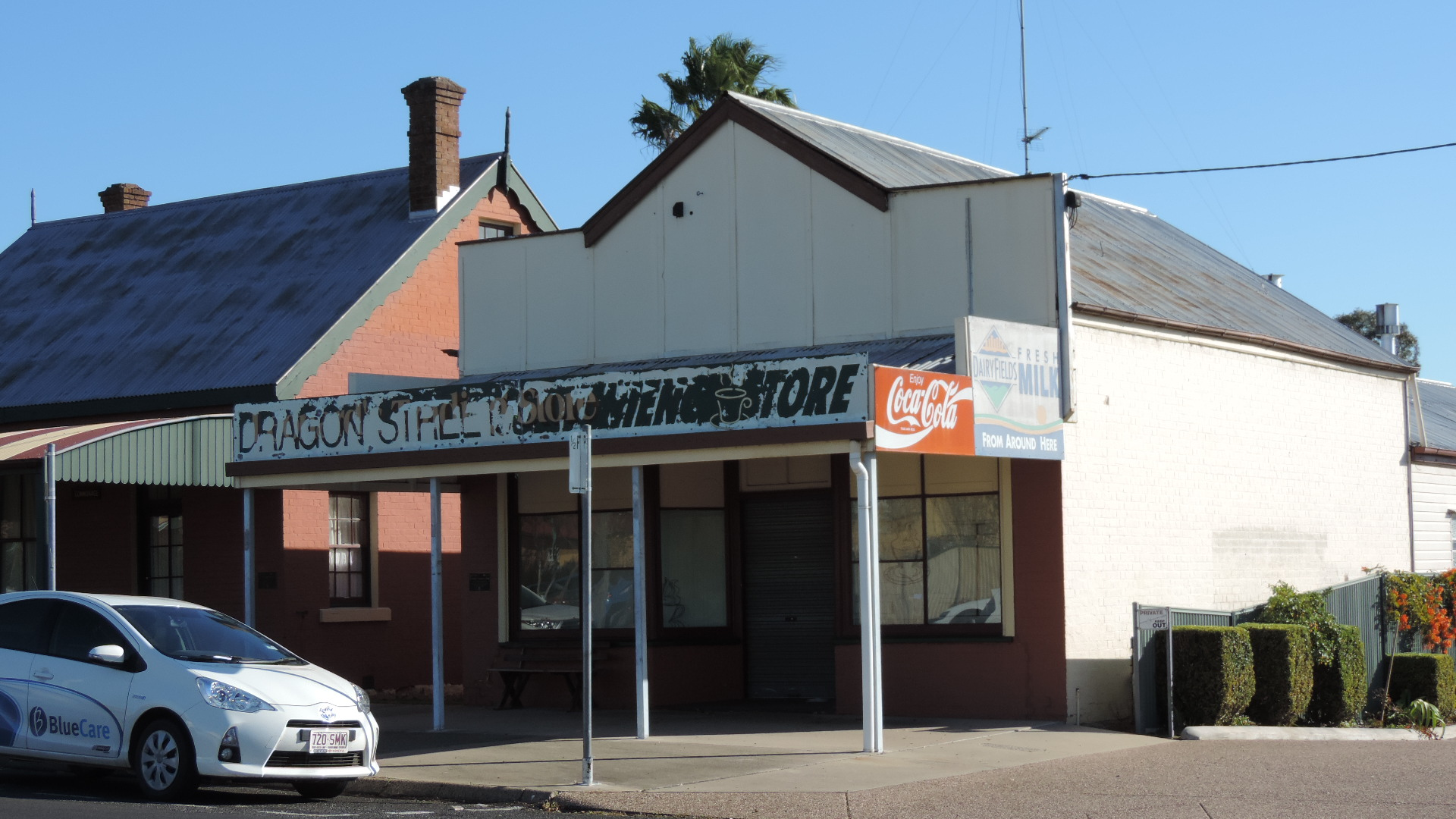
Leonard's trading store, 69 Dragon Street (The Commonage is to the left), 2015

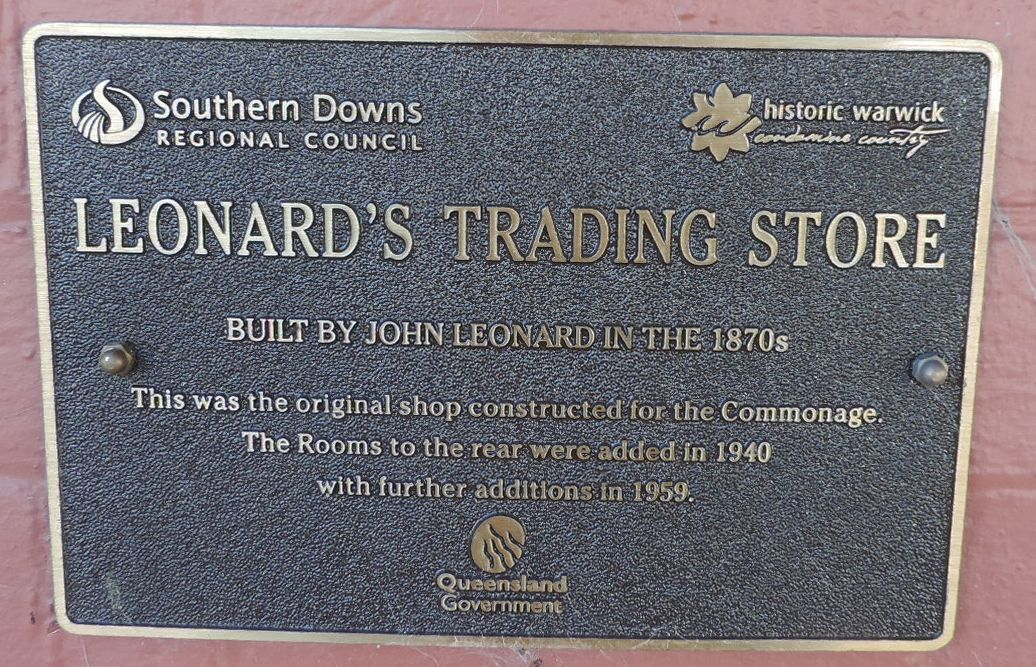
Plaque for Leonard's trading store, 2015

Locally it is understood that the shop to the north of the Commonage was erected by Leonard at a later date. Rate books from 1881 provide separate valuations for a house and shop on the allotment, indicating that a new detached shop may have been erected by this time. This shop is now listed on the Southern Downs Local Heritage Register as Leonard's trading store.

In January 1890, Leonard advertised the whole of his Dragon Street property for sale. At this time it comprised a half acre of land on which were erected a brick dwelling house of 4 rooms downstairs and 2 rooms upstairs, with kitchen, large produce shed and horse and cart shed, and a new brick store with a good 3-roomed dry store at the rear. The new store was stocked with drapery, groceries, boots and shoes, and Leonard advertised as the National Stores, Dragon Street.

The property did not sell at this time, and following Leonard's death in May 1898 was transmitted to his widow, Annie Leonard. Annie continued to run Leonard's business as a general storekeeper until c. 1914 at which time she disposed of the stock.

Annie died in 1924 and the property passed to Thomas John Holland. The property subsequently changed hands a number of times. The original out house and wash house were demolished c. 1949, and a skillion-roofed weatherboard addition erected at the rear of the house.

The allotment was subdivided in 1951, creating separate allotments for the Commonage and the shop.

The property was acquired in 1977 and substantial conservation work was done to the building, including reconstruction of the front awning, repainting the exterior and interior of the building and renovation of the c. 1949 addition.

== Description ==
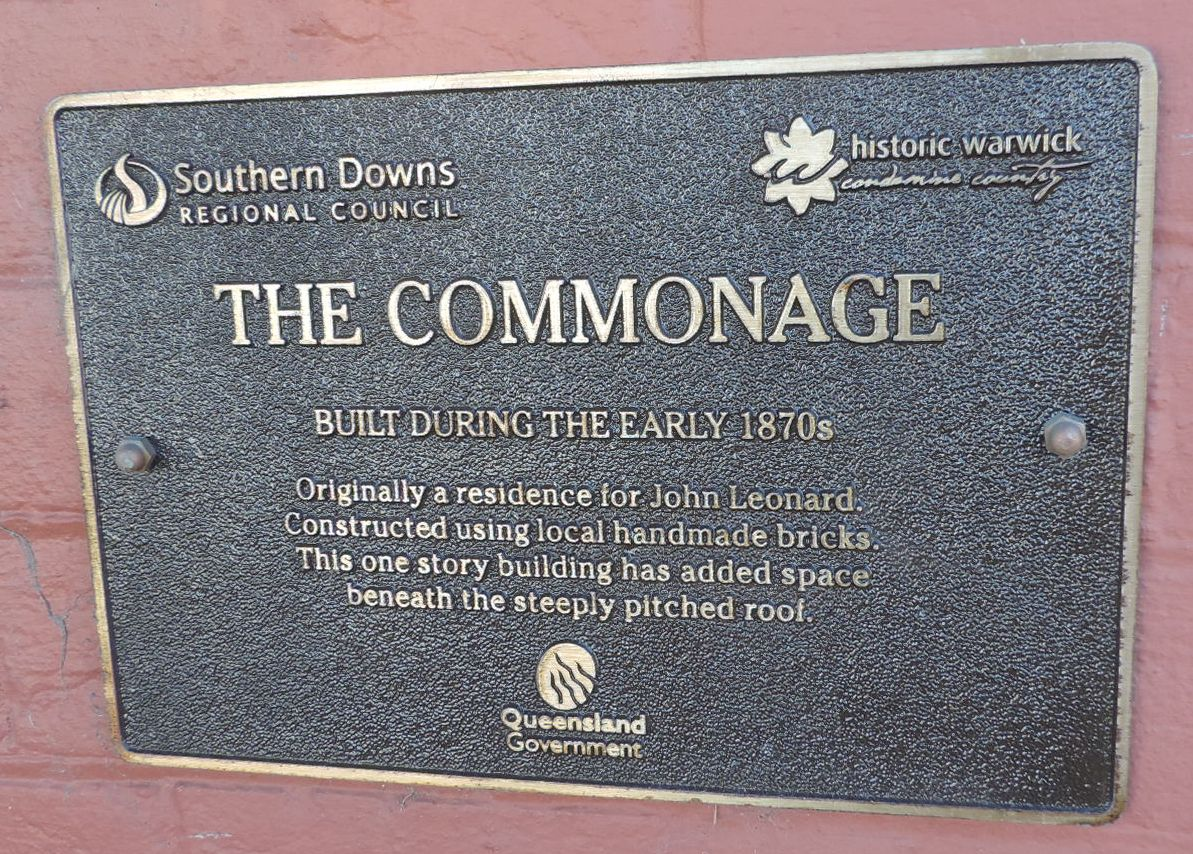
Plaque, 2015

The Commonage is a single-storeyed brick cottage with an attic space beneath its steeply pitched roof. It faces east onto Dragon Street, a residential street only several blocks from the main street of Warwick. Nearby, on the same side of this street is Pringle Cottage. The front wall of the Commonage is at the street alignment, with an awning overhanging part of the present footpath. There is a narrow laneway to the north, between the cottage and the adjoining shop, giving access to the rear yard.

The bricks, laid in Flemish bond, are reputedly hand-made locally but, apart from the two chimneys, are painted externally to resemble their unpainted colour. The footings, doorsteps, thresholds and window sills are of local sandstone. There is a steeply pitched corrugated iron gabled roof with fretted barge boards and turned finials. To the front is a reconstructed convex corrugated steel awning at the front extending to the former kerb line. To the rear is a contemporary yet sympathetic skillion addition with a corrugated steel roof and fibrous cement plank cladding.

The frontage has two doors, apparently separate entrances for the shop and the residence. These doors each have flush lower panels, a glazed upper panel of six panes, and a glazed fanlight above. The two large double-hung windows are either side of the southern door indicating this was probably the shop. There are smaller double-hung windows to the sides, including the attic space, some of which are original. The plan is rectangular with four rooms and a central corridor running from the shop to the recent addition at the rear. This addition contains the kitchen, dining and bathroom areas.

The plasterwork to the interior walls extends upwards from the chair rail, leaving a dado of exposed brickwork whilst the rising damp dries out. The rooms of the lower level have polished 200-millimetre (7.9 in)wide floorboards, most of which are original. The high ceilings are lined with wide beaded boards. The polished cedar joinery includes two chimneypieces and internal flush four-panelled doors.

From the room which was formerly the shop, is the straight varnished cedar staircase leading to the attic. It has turned balusters and newel, a panelled spandrel below, and a beaded board soffit over the doorway. The balustrade to the attic is simpler with squared posts and balusters. The attic is a single long room with tongue-and groove beaded boards to the side walls, flat and raked ceiling, and end walls of painted brick.

== Heritage listing ==
The Commonage was listed on the Queensland Heritage Register on 21 October 1992 having satisfied the following criteria.

The place is important in demonstrating the evolution or pattern of Queensland's history.

Constructed of brick, the dwelling is illustrative of the use of this building material in Warwick during the late 1860s and early 1870s.

The place demonstrates rare, uncommon or endangered aspects of Queensland's cultural heritage.

The Commonage is an unusual surviving example of a single-storeyed dwelling incorporating a shop; this dual function is reflected in the street elevation of the building, which has separate front entrances to house and shop.

The place is important because of its aesthetic significance.

The Commonage makes an aesthetic contribution to the Dragon Street streetscape, which includes Pringle Cottage. The building retains much original fabric including joinery, and plaster and boarded linings.
