= Warwick (given name) =

Warwick is a habitational given name derived from the English town of the same name. It may refer to:

== People ==
- Warwick Abrahim (born 1990), South African cricketer
- Warwick Adlam (born 1971), Australian cricketer
- Warwick Anderson (born 1958), Australian medical doctor, poet, and historian
- Warwick Angus (born 1969), Australian rules footballer
- Warwick Ball, Australian-born archeologist
- Warwick Banks (born 1939), British auto racing driver
- Warwick Braithwaite (1896–1971), New Zealand-born orchestral conductor
- Warwick Brown (born 1949), Australian Formula One driver
- Warwick Cairns (born 1962), British author
- Warwick Capper (born 1963), Australian Rules football player
- Warwick Cathro (born 1948), Australian librarian
- Warwick Collins (1948–2013), British novelist, screenwriter, yacht designer, and evolutionary theorist
- Warwick Dalton (born 1937), racing cyclist from New Zealand
- Warwick Davis (born 1970), English actor
- Warwick Deacock (1926–2017), British soldier, mountaineer and adventurer
- Warwick Draper (born 1976), Australian slalom canoeist
- Warwick Fairfax (born 1960), Australian businessman, son of Warwick Oswald Fairfax
- Warwick Fleury, New Zealand sailor
- Warwick Fox (born 1954), Australian philosopher and ethicist
- Warwick Freeman (born 1953), New Zealand jeweller
- Warwick Fyfe (born 1969), Australian operatic baritone
- Warwick Goble (1862–1943), British illustrator of children's books
- Warwick Green (born 1966), Australian rules footballer
- Warwick Gould (born 1947), Australian literary scholar
- Warwick Hele (1568–1626), English landowner and politician
- Warwick Henderson (born 1953), New Zealand gallerist and art collector
- Warwick Hough (1836–1915), Justice of the Supreme Court of Missouri
- Warwick Irwin (born 1952), Australian rules footballer
- Warwick Lightfoot, British politician, economist, and political adviser
- Warwick McKibbin (born 1957), Australian economist
- Warwick Moss (born 1947), Australian actor and television personality
- Warwick Murray (born 1972), New Zealand academic, educationalist and musician
- Warwick Nightingale (1956–1996), English guitarist and founder of the Sex Pistols
- Warwick Oswald Fairfax (1901–1987), Australian businessman, philanthropist, journalist and playwright
- Warwick Rimmer (born 1941), English football player and coach
- Warwick Rodwell (born 1946), English archaeologist, architectural historian and academic
- Warwick Saupold (born 1990), Australian professional baseball pitcher
- Warwick Smith (disambiguation) – multiple people
- Warwick Snedden (1920–1990), New Zealand cricketer
- Warwick Stevenson (born 1980), Australian bicycle motocross racer
- Warwick Taylor (born 1960), New Zealand rugby union player
- Warwick Thornton, Australian film director, screenwriter and cinematographer
- Warwick Tidy (born 1953), English cricketer
- Warwick Tucker, Australian mathematician
- Warwick Ward (1891–1967), English actor and film producer
- Warwick Waugh (born 1968), Australia rugby union team player
- Warwick Wright (born 1946), New Zealand field hockey player
- Warwick Yates (born 1951), Australian rules footballer

== Fictional characters ==
- Warwick, the Uncaged Wrath of Zaun, a playable champion character in the multiplayer online Battle Arena video game League of Legends
- Warwick Todd, a satirical Australian cricketer created by Tom Gleisner
