= Tulloch's Central Stores =

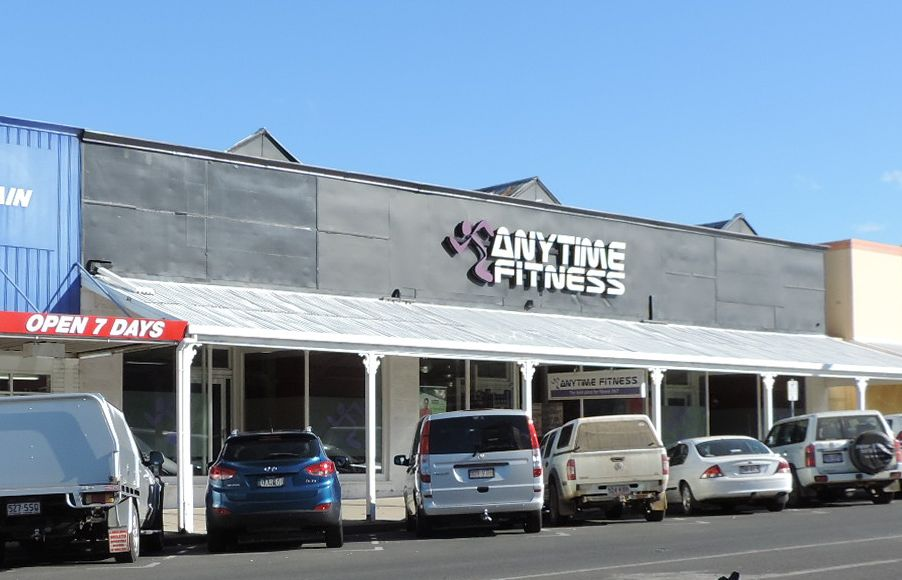
- Tulloch's Central Stores, 2015

- Location within Queensland Location within Australia
- 28.2162°S 152.031°E
- Location: 110–114 Grafton Street, Warwick, Southern Downs Region, Queensland, Australia

History
- Design period: 1870s–1890s (late 19th century)
- Built: c. 1873–1908

Queensland Heritage Register
- Official name: Olsen's Home Hardware Store, Tulloch's Central Stores, W.K. Hyslop & Sons (The Economists' Trading Centre), W.K. Hyslop's Reliance Stores
- Type: state heritage (built)
- Designated: 9 April 1998
- Reference no.: 601756
- Significant period: 1870s, 1900s (fabric); 1870s–ongoing (commercial use)

Tulloch's Central Stores is a heritage-listed general store at 110–114 Grafton Street, Warwick, Southern Downs Region, Queensland, Australia. It was built from c. 1873 to 1908. It is also known as W.K. Hyslop & Sons (The Economists' Trading Centre), W.K. Hyslop's Reliance Stores and Olsen's Home Hardware Store. It was added to the Queensland Heritage Register on 9 April 1998.

== History ==
Tulloch's Central Stores is a single-storeyed sandstone building constructed in at least two stages, mid-1870s and 1908.

The land on which the building is located was part of a larger town parcel (allotment 13 of section 28, parish of Warwick) alienated in 1859 for £7/16/-. However, by the time John Tulloch, a Warwick general storekeeper, purchased the land in 1872 from the original deed of grant holder for £50, there may well have been a small, shingle-roofed building, and possibly a cottage behind this, on the eastern part of the site (later occupied by Hyslops Furniture Store), which are evident in an 1899 photograph. Electoral rolls reveal that Tulloch was resident on his freehold land in Grafton Street from at least 1875 until c. 1880.

From October 1873 Tulloch was advertising in the local press as conducting the Central General Store, Grafton Street, and it is reasonable to suppose that this store was located on the land he had purchased in 1872. In 1876 he mortgaged his Grafton Street property to local "gentleman farmer" Bertie Chiverton Parr for £1000, and by September that year he was conducting the Central Stores, suggesting that he had more than one store on the site. It is likely that the eastern bay of the present stone building, which is of a smaller scale than the other bays, was erected at this time. In 1877 Tulloch took Emu Creek sawmill proprietor William Hall into partnership in his Central Stores, with Hall & Tulloch announcing plans to enlarge their business. What is now the middle bay of the present building may have been added at this time. The store was for some period one of the leading businesses of this town, but Tulloch lost the property to Parr when he defaulted on the mortgage. The firm conducted their final clearing sale in March 1879.

It is not known who then occupied the buildings until William Kennedy Hyslop, a young Scotsman who had been in the employ of GP Barnes at the Warwick Exchange (a drapery store), opened his own general grocery and drapery store in Grafton Street in September 1888, in the premises formerly known as Tulloch's Store. He leased these premises from Parr prior to purchasing the whole of the land and buildings in late 1892, for £600. According to rates records, the land contained a store/s and house at this time.

Hyslop had resided in Warwick from at least April 1886, when he married a local girl. He was to become a prominent member of Warwick's Good Samaritan Lodge of the Protestant Alliance Friendly Society of Australasia in Queensland, and an active community member in general. He called his Grafton Street business the Reliance Stores, importing many lines directly from Britain, avoiding wholesale costs and passing on those savings to the public, and the business proved immediately successful. He was prepared to deal in kind, and as late as 1897 was advertising that he would take farmers' butter, eggs and hides in exchange for drapery and groceries. In the second half of the 1890s he opened a branch store in Allora, run by his son James, but this had closed by 1903.

In September 1902, Warwick architect Hugh Campbell called tenders for three stores and a dwelling for WK Hyslop, adjoining the eastern side of the Reliance Stores in Grafton Street. Local builder Daniel Connolly won the contract with a price of £500, and the buildings were completed by late December. The shops were known as Hyslop's Buildings, and were constructed partly for rental purposes and partly to enable the firm to establish a furniture and bedding department. These shops occupied the corner of Grafton Street and Acacia Avenue, were of timber construction, and survive in a modified form as the present Hyslop's Furniture Store. They are not included within the listing in the Queensland Heritage Register.

The expansion of the dairy industry on the southern Darling Downs after the turn-of-the-century created boom years for Warwick businesses, and WK Hyslop was again able to expand his Grafton Street premises in 1908, when the stone buildings were extended and modified to form a larger, more cohesive building.

Warwick architects Wallace & Gibson (who later designed the new Barnes Emporium in Palmerin Street, 1910–11) called tenders for stone extensions to the WK Hyslop building in March 1908. The successful tenderer was HD Miller, with a price of £1089. Work commenced in May, and the new premises were opened in late October 1908. The modifications comprised: the addition of a third bay, extending the building to the western boundary of the property; an extension of 15 feet (4.6 m) to the rear of the existing stone buildings; remodelling of the existing shop fronts with large, fashionable plate- glass windows to match those of the new bay; and a new front awning and posts constructed across the whole. Physical evidence suggests that the stone blocks in the western and southern walls of the 1870s buildings were re-used in the construction of the 1908 western and southern walls: the semi-circular headed windows in these walls are more 1870s than early 20th century in design, and there are some oddly placed picked stones in the western and southern walls.

The additions to WK Hyslop's Reliance Stores were considered by his contemporaries to make a substantial improvement to Grafton Street, which was being transformed rapidly with the construction of a number of impressive masonry buildings, including The National Hotel (1907 & extensions in 1908–09) at the corner of Lyon Street; Devine's Buildings (1907) at the southwest corner of Grafton and Palmerin Streets; and a new Caledonian Stores (1907).

With the enlargement of his main premises, Hyslop was able to move all his departments into one building, and offer each of the shops in the 1902 Hyslop's Buildings for rental. Although Hyslop had opened a furniture and bedding department in the early 1900s, the firm continued to specialise in clothing and drapery until the 1920s at least. About 1914, the firm became WK Hyslop & Sons, and by 1922 was operating as The Economists' Trading Centre, Grafton Street.

In 1923, Hyslop let the stone building on a 10-year lease to The ACB, a Brisbane-based drapery firm which by 1933 had a chain of 30 stores throughout Queensland. During the 1920s the ACB was one of Warwick's three principal drapery stores, the competition being Barnes & Co. and Johnson & Sons. With the depression years of the early 1930s The ACB was bankrupted, and it is understood that the Warwick store reverted to being part of WK Hyslops & Sons, who had maintained their furniture business in the adjacent timber building.

William Hyslop had subdivided the land c. 1924, retaining title to the site of the stone building [subs 3 & 5] until his death in 1944, and transferring the 1902 Hyslop's Buildings (subs 1, 2 & 4) to his sons John and James. He does not appear to have resided in Warwick after the late 1920s. James Hyslop died in 1948, and in February 1949 title to the property containing the stone building passed out of the Hyslop family.

The building has functioned as a hardware store since the early 1940s. When Barnes & Co. liquidated c. 1938, their hardware business was purchased by members of the Connolly family of Warwick in partnership with Charles McKenzie, formerly the manager of Barnes' hardware department, and they formed The Warwick Hardware Company. This firm shifted to the Hyslop's stone building c. 1942, and purchased the property in 1949. The store remained The Warwick Hardware Company premises until 1970, when Dave Washbourne and Alexander McKenzie started trading there as M & W Hardware (a Mitre 10 franchise), purchasing the property in 1976. In the 1980s the property changed hands a number of times, but the hardware business has been sustained.

The property underwent a change of ownership in 1988, with a number of alterations subsequently made to the building, including opening up the street awning, (which had been enclosed), replacing the front verandah posts, removing the walls and ceilings of the front display windows, concreting the floor, and adding an office extension to the rear of the building.

Olsen's Home Hardware later shifted to a different Warwick location in Fitzroy Street. The store was vacant in 2010, but in 2015 was occupied by an Anytime Fitness gym.

== Description ==
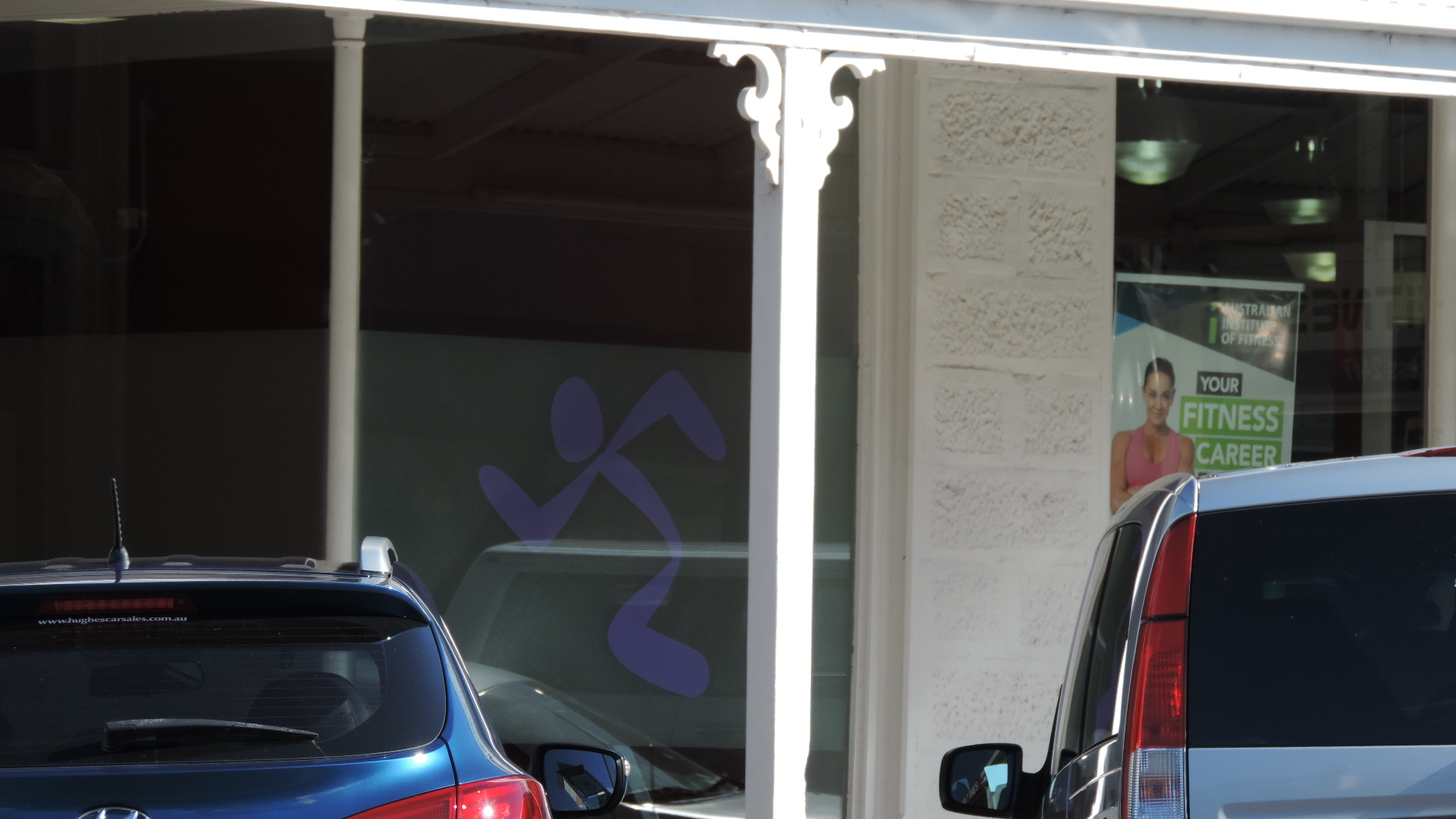
Close-up of timber posts and stonework, 2015

Tulloch's Central Stores, a single-storeyed sandstone structure, has a triple gable corrugated iron roof partly concealed behind a parapet wall. The building is located fronting Grafton Street to the north, and consists of a single shop-front at the eastern end separated from an adjacent double shop-front by a section of sandstone wall. A continuous corrugated iron skillion roof verandah is located over the footpath.

The verandah has timber posts with timber brackets, and the parapet wall supports signage. Each shop-front consists of recessed French doors flanked by glass bays. Each bay window has a turned timber corner post, with the front section and return section each containing a single pane of glass. The double shop-front also has high level glazing which has been sheeted over. The sections of sandstone wall and timber window surrounds are painted.

The western and southern walls are constructed of predominantly rough faced ashlar, with dressed stones around window and door openings. The western wall has three tall arched sash windows with steel bars, and the bottom course of stone, slightly expressed to suggest a base, has small vented openings. The southern wall of the western section of the building has two arched doorways, which have enclosed walkways attached, flanked by a tall arched sash window with steel bars to either side. The southern wall of the eastern section, which is three courses shorter than the western section, has an arched sash window with steel bars and a doorway with paired timber doors and a glass fanlight.

Internally, the western section of the building, with the double shop- front, has a central row of timber posts. The eastern section of the building is separated by a rendered sandstone wall, with access via an arched opening. A second arched opening has reportedly been bricked- in and is covered by display walls. Interior walls are rendered, and side and rear windows have been sheeted over with displays of merchandise. Both sections of the building have boarded ceilings, and concrete floors have been laid with a setback from the side and rear sandstone walls. This setback has been filled with gravel and covered with a raised display platform, and is intended to allow moisture to evaporate to alleviate rising damp in the stonework.

At the rear of the building, a small single-storeyed timber and fibrous cement clad structure has been attached via a covered ramping walkway. This structure, which is used as an office, has a corrugated iron hipped roof, timber stumps and sash windows. Paired timber doors open to the rear, and the structure is attached to a second walkway on the western side which accesses an adjacent corrugated iron clad storage shed. Neither of these structures is considered to be of cultural heritage significance.

An L-shaped shed with a skillion roof is located towards the rear of the property. This structure has timber stumps, corrugated iron cladding and is used for storage. It is not considered to be of cultural heritage significance.

== Heritage listing ==
Tulloch's Central Stores was listed on the Queensland Heritage Register on 9 April 1998 having satisfied the following criteria.

The place is important in demonstrating the evolution or pattern of Queensland's history.

Olsen's Home Hardware Store, constructed in at least two stages (mid-1870s and 1908), is significant in illustrating the principal phases of early Warwick and district development, and in particular the flow-on effects to Warwick businesses of the district's "dairy boom" in the early years of the 20th century. The place is important also in illustrating the strong and, for Queensland, unique tradition of stone construction in Warwick and district which was sustained from the mid-19th to early 20th centuries.

The place has potential to yield information that will contribute to an understanding of Queensland's history.

With further research, the place has the potential to reveal important information about stone construction and materials in Warwick, and about local historical processes and developments.

The place is important in demonstrating the principal characteristics of a particular class of cultural places.

The building clearly demonstrates the principal characteristics of an evolving late 19th century store of substance and quality, with a turn-of-the-century remodelling which reflected new attitudes to merchandise display and customer convenience, as well as the buoyant nature of the local economy. This is particularly evident in the inclusion of the large plate-glass display windows.

The place is important because of its aesthetic significance.

The building is significant for its strong contribution to the streetscape and to the Warwick townscape, in terms of materials, scale, form, design and intactness. The building makes a significant contribution to the unique nature of Warwick, with its substantial proportion of surviving 19th and early 20th century stone and brick buildings.

The place has a strong or special association with a particular community or cultural group for social, cultural or spiritual reasons.

The building is of significance to members of the Warwick community and of Queensland generally who value Warwick's historical reputation as "The Sandstone City".

The place has a special association with the life or work of a particular person, group or organisation of importance in Queensland's history.

The place has a strong association with the Hyslop family, who were prominent in the Warwick community from the 1880s to at least the 1940s, both as businesspersons and as active members of religious and social organisations, and who were respected for their charitable works.
