= Langham Hotel, Warwick =

Langham Hotel
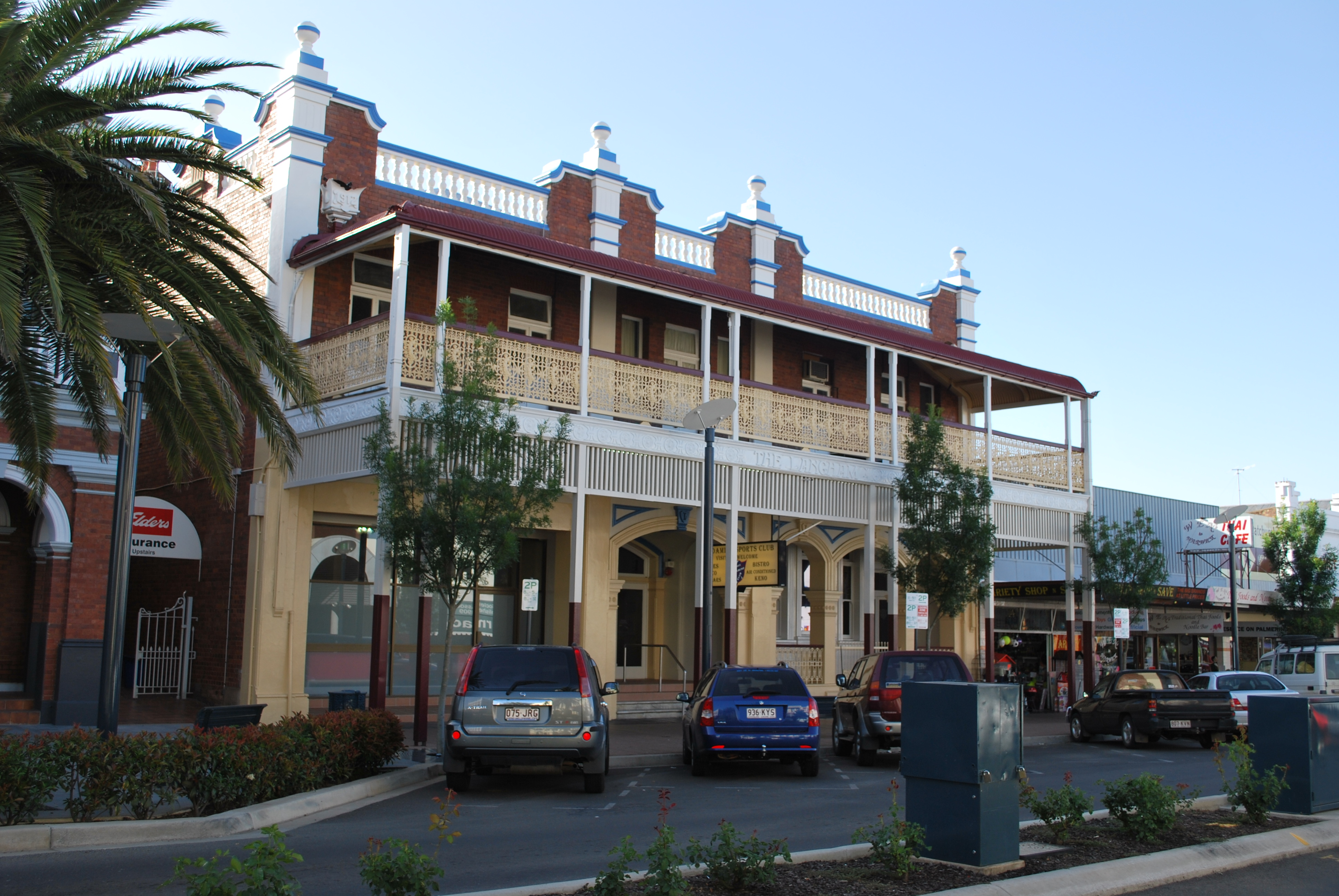
- Condamine Sports Club (formerly Langham Hotel), 2008

- Location within Queensland Location within Australia
- 28.2169°S 152.032°E
- Location: 133 Palmerin Street, Warwick, Southern Downs Region, Queensland, Australia

History
- Design period: 1900–1914 (early 20th century)
- Built: 1912–1913

Site notes
- Architect: Dornbusch & Connolly
- Architectural style: Classicism

Queensland Heritage Register
- Official name: Langham Hotel
- Type: state heritage (built)
- Designated: 21 October 1992
- Reference no.: 600957
- Significant period: 1910s (fabric); 1913–ongoing (historical use)
- Significant components: lead light/s, shop/s, garden – roof

Langham Hotel is a heritage-listed hotel at 133 Palmerin Street, Warwick, Southern Downs Region, Queensland, Australia. It was designed by Dornbusch & Connolly and built from 1912 to 1913. It was added to the Queensland Heritage Register on 21 October 1992. It is now home to a registered club, the Condamine Sports Club.

== History ==
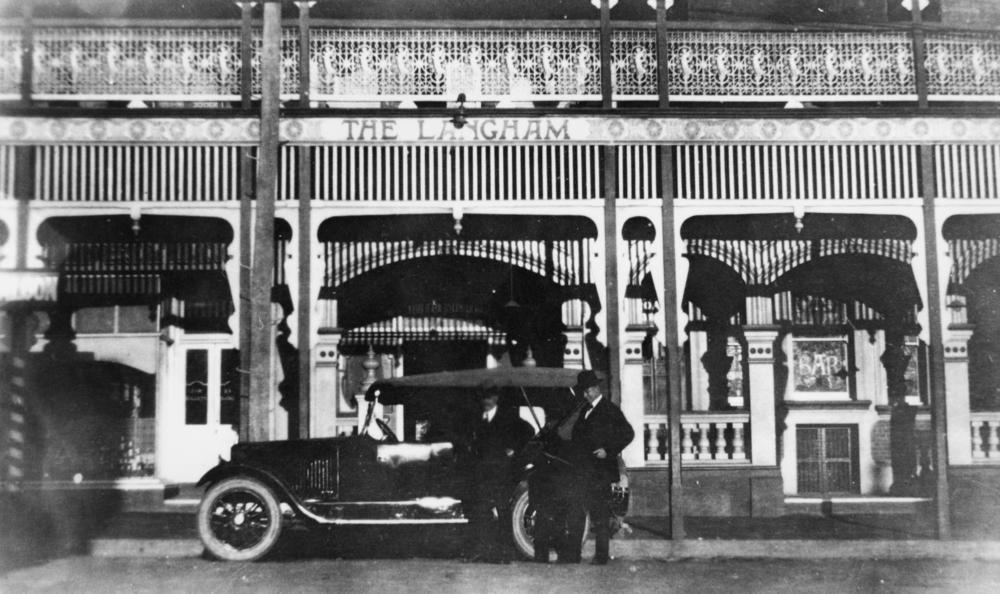
Langham Hotel in Warwick, circa 1928

Completed in 1913, the Langham Hotel was designed by Warwick architects Dornbusch and Connolly for Mrs Cobcroft. The Langham Hotel replaced an earlier hotel on the site known as the Rose Inn.

The property was acquired by Maria Dank in 1860, then transferred to John Heffernan in 1870 and to William Law in 1871. By 1881 records indicate that there was a hotel on the site, also a house and a cottage which fronted a lane. Records of licenses issued show that the hotel was known as the Rose Inn Hotel.

In 1911 the property was transferred to Arthur John Cobcroft, a Bank Manager of Warwick. In the same year Edward Portley, then licensee of the Rose Inn Hotel, was granted a licence to carry on business temporarily during the demolition and re-erection of the hotel premises. Title records indicate that Cobcroft leased the property to Daniel Allman from October 1911.

Tenders were invited in January 1912 for the erection and completion of the Langham Hotel, Palmerin Street Warwick for Mrs CA Cobcroft. A detailed description of the new hotel appeared in the Warwick Examiner and Times in August 1913. The erection of the hotel by Mrs Cobcroft was described as "... a progressive move on her part and provides an ornament to the town... , reflecting Mrs Cobcroft's optimistic view of the future of Warwick". The article noted that the Hotel will be conducted under the direction of Mr and Mrs Allman, and will be managed by Mrs Stokes, who has been managing Allman's Hotel in Grafton Street for the past four years. During the early twentieth century the Allman family owned and also operated the National Hotel (then Allman's Hotel) and the Criterion Hotel in Warwick.

Sample rooms were provided in the hotel, and stabling accommodation was available. The main staircase of the hotel was designed to enable the subsequent installation of a passenger lift, however there is no evidence to indicate that this ever occurred. The article also indicated that the walls of the hotel had been built of such a thickness that two additional stories could be added at any time which indicates a possible reason for the provision for a passenger lift.

The ground floor of the hotel included a shop to the southern side of the main Palmerin Street entry, and in August 1913 PR Woods, a Chemist, removed his business to the commodious new shop in the Langham Hotel premises.

The property was transferred to James Roach in 1919 and remained in the Roach family until 1948. The property was subsequently held by a number of people until 1964 when it was acquired by Anthony and Jacob Maroon. Jacob Maroon died in 1979 and his share transmitted to Anthony Maroon. In 1995, the lease on the property was held by Anthony Maroon and Marcell Maroon. In 2015, the premises are used by the Condamine Sports Club.

== Description ==
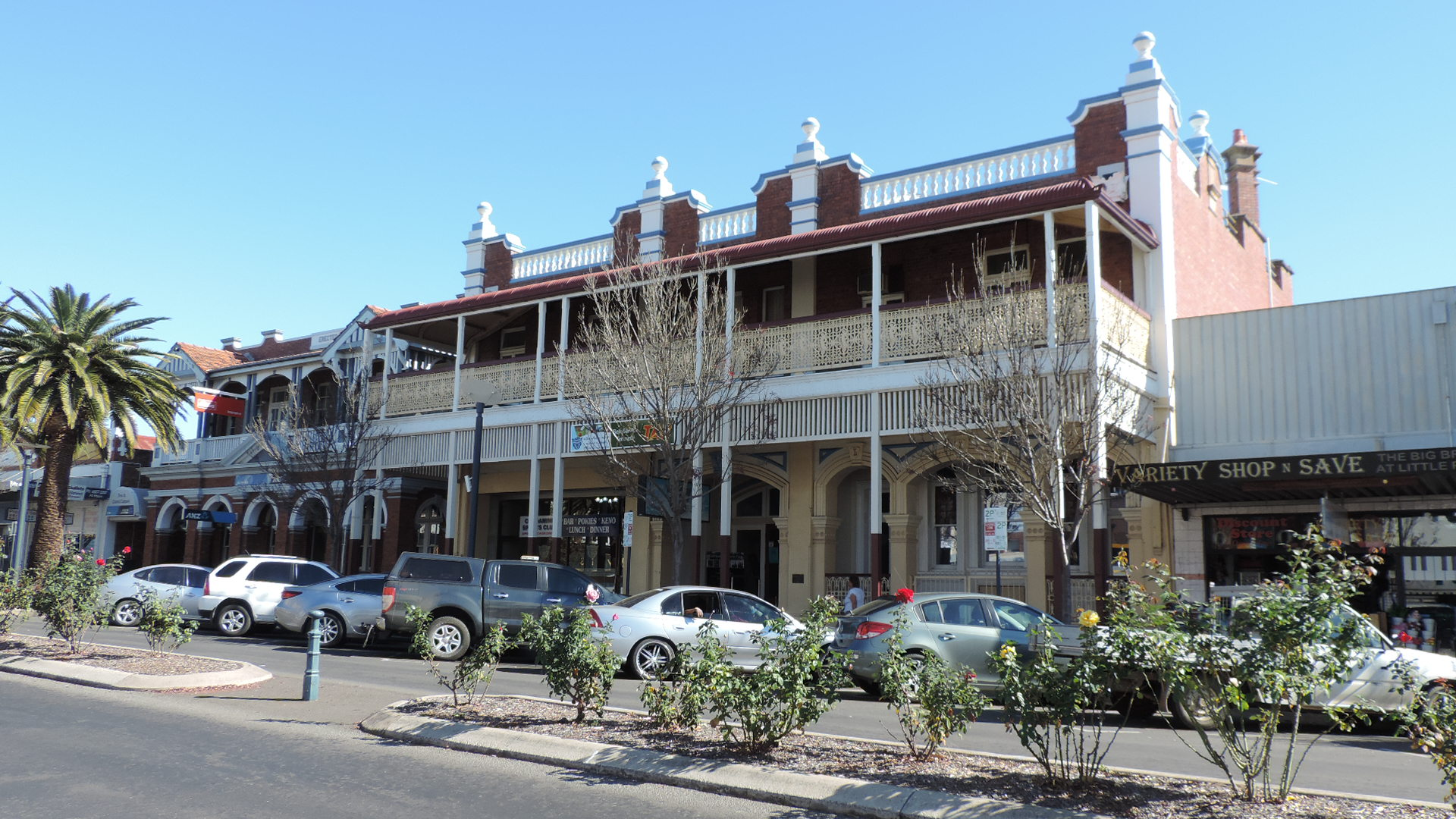
Langham Hotel, 2015

The Langham Hotel is a two-storeyed brick building on the southern end of the business centre of Palmerin Street, the main street of Warwick. The property is elongated, with the narrow eastern end facing the street. Its street elevation has a two-storey filigreed verandah extending over the footpath and a masonry facade beneath articulated with moulded archways and pilasters, and topped with a balustraded parapet of classical motifs. Behind this balustrade is a roof terrace giving commanding views of the main street and the roofs of the city.

The eastern end of the building contains mainly public spaces, and from it run two parallel accommodation wings along the northern and southern boundaries. These have simple elevations of face brickwork and window penetrations. Between these wings a roof has been added enclosing the lightwell below. The rear of the site extends into an extensive public carpark.

The front verandah has stop-chamfered timber posts, doubled at the central and end bays. The cast iron balustrade features the classical motif of a woman in flowing gowns at the centre of each panel. Below the balustrade is a pressed metal frieze, then a slatted timber valance. To the underside of the verandah has a ripple iron lining trimmed with moulded metal gutters. The hipped bullnose roof to the verandah is of corrugated iron, and framed with stop-chamfered purlins and shaped rafters. The gutter has a decorative metal acroterion remaining on one corner. Above is balustraded parapet of moulded plaster pedestals topped with ball motifs, concrete balusters and face brick surrounds. To each end are ornate metal rainwater heads announcing 1912 as the year of the building's construction. The balustrade returns at each end for only one bay, as the side elevations become much simpler and less ornate.

At street level, the facade is an arcade of moulded segmental archways with pilasters, ornate capitals and keystones engraved with the letter "L". At the northern end are stairs to two entries to the public bar with double doors of silky oak and etched glass, and double hung windows between. To the central archway are white marble steps to a pair of similar doors with matching sidelights and arched toplight, which leads to the entrance vestibule. Beside the central arch is a small illuminated sign of the hotel's name. To the south is the entry to a retail tenancy with a recent aluminium shopfront.

The entrance vestibule has a pressed metal ceiling, and leads to the former telephone lobby which features tessellated floor tiles and a leadlight window. Through a further triplet of moulded plaster archways with keystones, capitals and balusters, is the main stair hall. The stair has squared balusters and newels, and a panelled spandrel below. Adjoining is the public bar whose layout has been altered, but it retains its pressed metal ceiling with roses, cornices borders and beam linings.

The rear of the ground level has also been largely altered. The light area between the accommodation wings has been roofed over to form the lounge bar and the former billiard room and dining room have had walls removed, but the dining room retains its pressed metal ceiling.

The stair to the first floor was lit by leadlight windows which are now blocked by the addition of later bathrooms. The stair hall at the first floor level has similar archways leading to the lounge which in turn opens onto the verandah. Also from the stair hall lead the corridors to the accommodation wings, which both have pressed metal ceilings with roses and cornices, four-panelled doors with glazed fanlights, and tall timber skirtings. All the bedrooms also have pressed metal ceilings. The southern wing has a coloured glass door leading to a verandah, onto which open several glazed French doors to further bedrooms.

The lounge also features a pressed metal ceiling with borders, roses and cornice, also a picture rail and tall timber cornice. Opening from here and other rooms onto the balcony are panelled and glazed French doors with tilting fanlights. The facade treatment here is face brickwork with flat brick arch lintels, simple pilasters continuing from ground level to the parapet, and double-hung windows with moulded plaster sills.

The main stair continues to a third level, where the stair hall features the continuation of the stair balustrade, leadlight windows and pressed metal ceiling. Externally it is brick with a hipped roof of corrugated iron again with acroteria to the gutter corners. It opens onto the gravelled roof terrace with its views over the city. From here can also be seen the hipped roof of the north wing in metal deck, and the gabled roof of the south wing in corrugated iron. The brick chimney shafts have rendered mouldings and cornice, and terra cotta chimney pots. At the roof terrace they are grouped in stacks and turned on the diagonal, showing an Old English influence.

The building features many classical motifs, both internal and external, in its articulated street facade and ornamentation of the major rooms. There is an extensive range of pressed metal ceilings throughout the building, with the degree of ornamentation varying with the importance of the room. Also intact is a substantial amount of joinery, in particular the elaborate staircase.

== Heritage listing ==
Langham Hotel was listed on the Queensland Heritage Register on 21 October 1992 having satisfied the following criteria.

The place is important in demonstrating the evolution or pattern of Queensland's history.

The Langham Hotel survives as evidence of the role of Warwick as a commercial centre for the surrounding district.

The place is important in demonstrating the principal characteristics of a particular class of cultural places.

In street frontage, internal organisation and interior ornamentation, the building is typical of hotels erected in Warwick during the early 20th century. Internally, the building retains substantial amounts of original fabric including pressed metal ceilings, plaster mouldings and joinery.

The place is important because of its aesthetic significance.

Prominently located within the business centre of Warwick, this substantial two storey brick hotel with filligree verandah contributes to the Palmerin Street streetscape and the Warwick townscape.
