= Paul Warwick =

Paul Warwick may refer to:

- Paul Warwick (racing driver) (1969–1991), English racing driver
- Paul Warwick (rugby union) (born 1981), Australian rugby union player
