= Warwick Mountain =

Mountain in Alberta, Canada

- Location within Alberta

Highest point
- Elevation: 2,906 m (9,534 ft)
- Prominence: 566 m (1,857 ft)
- Listing: Mountains of Alberta
- Coordinates: 52°13′59″N 117°33′30″W

Geography
- Country: Canada
- Province: Alberta
- Protected area: Jasper National Park
- Parent range: Park Ranges
- Topo map: NTS 83C4 Clemenceau Icefield

Climbing
- First ascent: 1919 by the Interprovincial Boundary Commission
- Easiest route: rock/snow climb

Warwick Mountain is a mountain in Alberta, Canada.

It is located south of Warwick Creek in the Athabasca River Valley of Jasper National Park. It stands east of the Chaba Icefield and north of the Columbia Icefield.

The mountain was named in 1919 by Arthur O. Wheeler after Warwick Castle in England when he noted the castellated appearance of the mountain and it being situated just 8 km (5.0 mi) north of Mt. King Edward.
