= Warwick Township =

Warwick Township may refer to:

== Canada ==
- Warwick, Ontario (Warwick Township, Lambton County)

== United States ==
- Warwick Township, Benson County, North Dakota
- Warwick Township, Tuscarawas County, Ohio
- Warwick Township, Bucks County, Pennsylvania
- Warwick Township, Chester County, Pennsylvania
- Warwick Township, Lancaster County, Pennsylvania

== See also ==
- Warwick (disambiguation)
