= Plumb's Chambers =

Pair of shops in Queensland, Australia

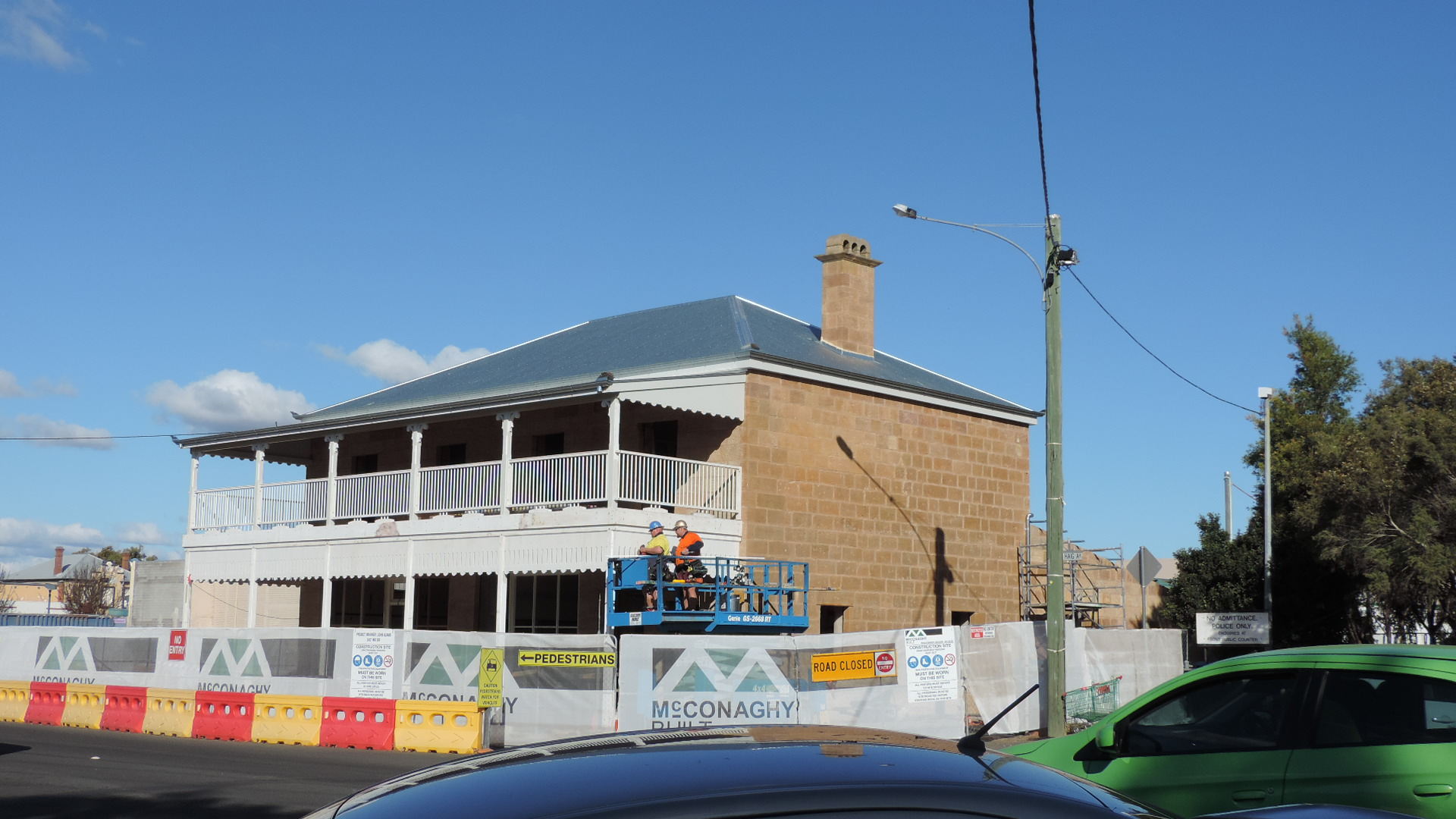
- Plumb's Chambers, 24 Fitzroy Street, being renovated, 2015

- Location within Queensland Location within Australia
- 28.2143°S 152.0319°E
- Location: 82 & 84 Fitzroy Street, Warwick, Southern Downs Region, Queensland, Australia

History
- Design period: 1840s–1860s (mid-19th century)
- Built: 1860s – c. 1910

Queensland Heritage Register
- Official name: Plumb's Chambers, Medical Hall
- Type: state heritage (built)
- Designated: 3 November 1997
- Reference no.: 601725
- Significant period: 1860s–c. 1910 (fabric); 1860s–1880s (historical)
- Significant components: service wing, out building/s, residential accommodation – house/quarters above shop/s, garage, shop/s, toilet block/earth closet/water closet

Plumb's Chambers is a heritage-listed pair of shops at 82 & 84 Fitzroy Street, Warwick, Southern Downs Region, Queensland, Australia. Despite being believed to be Queensland's oldest shop, No. 82 was demolished on 27 October 2014. However, a restoration of No. 84 commenced in March 2015. They were built from 1860s to c. 1910. It is also known as Medical Hall. It was added to the Queensland Heritage Register on 3 November 1997.

== History ==
Plumb's Chambers comprises two distinct buildings. One is a substantial, two-storeyed stone building with rear service wings, constructed in 1874–75 for Warwick chemist and seedsman David Clarke. This building functioned as shops on the ground floor with residential accommodation above. The second comprises a small, two-storeyed brick and timber building with brick extensions at the rear. From photographic evidence, sections of this building appear to pre-date the adjacent 1874–75 stone building.

The whole site was initially part of allotment 12 of section 21 in the Town of Warwick (comprising 2 roods (22,000 sq ft; 2,000 m^{2})), first sold at auction in September 1857 for £4. In 1866 title to the whole of the allotment passed to Frederick Hudson, public of Warwick, who purchased the land for £40. It is not known whether improvements had been made to the property by this date. Hudson transferred the property to his wife Margaret, who subdivided the block into three parts, selling off the western and eastern subdivisions in 1868. Mrs Hudson retained the middle subdivision, on which the present brick and timber building stands, until 1876.

=== The 1874–75 Stone Building (No.84 Fitzroy Street) ===
The western part of the allotment, about 29 perches (730 m^{2}), (later subdivision 1) was sold for £60 to David Clarke, chemist and druggist of Warwick, and title was transferred to him in May 1868.

Clarke, an Irish Protestant emigrant and dispensing chemist since c. 1856, arrived in Warwick in 1867. During the next 15 years he played an important role in the development of agriculture in the Warwick district, at a period when powerful local pastoralists were still strongly opposed to opening the land to selection. Clarke actively promoted the expansion of agriculture on the southern Darling Downs, specialising in the importation of seeds (including cotton and Indian wheat) and fruit trees likely to succeed in the district. In late 1867 he instigated the formation of the highly successful Eastern Downs Horticultural and Agricultural Association, established in October that year. He was the Association's first secretary, and retained that position for well over a decade. In the early 1880s Walter Hill, curator of the Botanic Gardens in Brisbane, said of David Clarke that he had ". . . done as much to foster and encourage agriculture as any man he knew of in the colony, and who had placed the district under considerable obligation to him . . .". Clarke also took an active role in Protestant work and was nominated for the 1880 Warwick town council elections.

In May 1867 Clarke had established a wholesale and retail Drug, Grocery and Seed Warehouse in Warwick in rented premises at the corner of Fitzroy and Albion Streets, opposite the first Bank of New South Wales. By October 1869, Clarke's business had proved so successful that he was able to separate the drug and seed departments from his grocery business, moving the former into a purpose-built addition which opened on 15 November 1869 as the Medical Hall. In the early 1870s business expanded with a branch opened at Quartpot Creek (Stanthorpe) following the discovery of tin early in 1872 (this branch seems to have been short-lived) and in May 1872 a move across Fitzroy Street to larger premises formerly occupied by the Bank of New South Wales.

Clarke's success in Warwick as a dispensing and manufacturing chemist and seedsman culminated in 1874 with the selling off of his grocery business to George P Barnes (formerly Clarke's assistant) and William Lavers in October, and the construction of substantial new stone premises on the Fitzroy Street land he had acquired in 1868 from Margaret Hudson. The site overlooked the Square (now Leslie Park) and was just down the road from the new Bank of New South Wales on the southwest corner of Palmerin and Fitzroy Streets.

The new Medical Hall must have been well under construction when Clarke called tenders for the carpenter's work in October 1874 and the plasterer's work in January 1875. In late February 1875 Clarke advertised for sale the portable building then occupied by his chemist shop - this was located in Fitzroy Street, but on which allotment is not clear - and the new stone building must have been close to completion at this time.

When completed, Clarke's two-storeyed stone building contained residential accommodation on the first floor and at least two shops on the ground floor. Besides accommodating Clarke's Medical Hall, from May 1875 Barnes & Lavers, grocers, also moved into part of the building. By August 1877 Barnes and Lavers had moved out, but two grocery shops as well as the Medical Hall were operating on the ground floor from August 1877 to March–April 1878.

The building was erected during the town's first "boom", when Warwick was transformed in the late 1860s and 1870s from a squatters' town into the principal urban centre of a prosperous pastoral and agricultural district. It was a substantial building and made a prominent contribution to the streetscape. Retailers in nearby premises frequently advertised in the 1870s-early 1880s as "adjoining" or "adjacent" to David Clarke's chemist shop.

In the early 1880s David Clarke passed the running of his business to his son, Charles De Lacy Clarke, also a licensed chemist, and left Warwick early in 1882. Charles Clarke then took over the Medical Hall in his own name, but by September/October 1882 had purchased a business in St George, advertising the Warwick building for rent. At that period the main building comprised 15 rooms, with a large shop and storeroom on the ground floor, residential accommodation on the first floor, bathroom, kitchen, stables, coach-house and a large underground water tank with pump.

Despite an attempt in 1893 by David Clarke's mortgagor, the Queensland Investment and Land Mortgage Co. Ltd, to sell the property, the title remained in Clarke's name until November 1909, when it was transferred to retired Freestone farmer and grazier, James Wilson. During the period 1883–1909 the property was let either as a house, store or both. Tenants included Dr William Tilley, surgeon at the Warwick hospital, from 1887 to 1889; Mrs WD Wilson, storekeeper and widow of a former Warwick businessman and Mayor, 1891–94; and S Benjamin, wine and spirit merchant, from 1899 until at least the early 1900s.

James Wilson occupied the stone building as his town residence for less than a year before his death in September 1910. However, in mid-1910 he had requested and received permission from the Warwick Town Council to erect a balcony over the footpath in front of his stone buildings, and was in the process of carrying out what were described in the local press as extensive alterations to his home when he collapsed. It is understood that the present balcony and some rear renovations date to this period.

=== The brick and timber building (No.82 Fitzroy Street) ===
Mrs Hudson retained the middle section of allotment 12 until 1876. Photographic evidence reveals several structures extant on the site c. 1872; whether any of these survive as part of the present brick and timber building has not been established, although it is possible. In April 1869 Mrs Hudson had advertised to let Borger's old blacksmith's shop adjoining the Royal Exchange Hotel, (the hotel was on the southwest corner of Fitzroy and Palmerin Streets, on the site later occupied by the Bank of New South Wales). Warwick historian Thomas Hall recalled in 1925 that Henry Borger opened a blacksmith's shop in Fitzroy Street, and it may have been on that part of allotment 12 which Mrs Hudson still held in 1869.

In November 1876, title to this property, about 34.5 perches (870 m^{2}) (later subdivision 3 of allotment 12 of section 21), was transferred to Charles Joseph Isambert, wine and spirit merchant of Warwick, who had paid £325 for the site. A c. 1899 photograph reveals two buildings on this site: the present two-storeyed brick and timber building, and a single-storeyed timber shop to its east. Warwick Municipal Council rate records reveal that Isambert ran a business in one of these buildings from at least 1881, and that the other was let from 1881 to 1894 to Henry Borger, blacksmith, and in 1895 to John Borger, also a blacksmith. The easternmost shop was replaced by 1901 with a cottage [since demolished] erected for Isambert's daughter, Mary Ann Saunders. No tenant occupied the site after 1895, suggesting that the blacksmith's shop was the single-storeyed timber structure replaced by 1901 with Mrs Saunders' cottage, and that Isambert's business was conducted from the present brick and timber building.

CJ Isambert had held the license for the European Hotel in Grafton Street, Warwick 1872–75. By December 1876 he had a boot warehouse in Guy Street, removing in March 1878 to larger and more convenient premises in Fitzroy-street, adjoining Mr Clarke's chemist shop. This is likely to be the present brick and timber building, on land he had acquired in 1876. No record has been found of premises being erected for Isambert on this site or any other at this period, and it is likely the building to which he removed in 1878 was extant at the time he acquired title to the property in 1876. His business was still located in Fitzroy Street, opposite the Square, in January 1880, and by August 1882 he had disposed of his boot stock and opened a new drapery store in the same premises, next door to Charles Clarke's chemist shop in Fitzroy Street. In September 1884 Isambert auctioned off the contents of his drapery store, but retained the Fitzroy Street property, possibly using the building in connection with his wine and spirit dealership, for which he held a Wholesale Spirit Dealer's License 1889–91. He retired in the early 1890s, a few years before his death in 1893.

Following Isambert's death the property passed to trustees and then to his daughter. James Wilson acquired title in July 1910, just over 6 months after acquiring the adjacent stone building. The verandah on the brick and timber building matches in detail the 1910 verandah on the adjacent stone building, and may have been constructed subsequent to Wilson's death in September 1910.

=== Plumb's Chambers (Nos 84 & 82 Fitzroy Street) ===
The two buildings had been owned separately until title to both was transferred to James Wilson in 1909–10. In 1914, title to subdivision 1 of allotment 12 (the stone building) and resubdivisions 1 & 2 of subdivision 3 of allotment 12, comprising 15 perches (380 m^{2}), (the brick and timber building) passed to Warwick bootmaker James Plumb and his family, and at some period after this date both sets of buildings become known as Plumb's Chambers. Plumb was active in the masonic movement, and served as Worshipful Grand Master of St George's Lodge in Warwick. He resided and worked at the Fitzroy Street premises until his death in 1933, and his widow remained there until her death in 1948. It is understood that the present owner acquired the property in 1949.

By June 2013, the buildings were in poor condition and it was proposed to demolish the brick-and-timber building (No. 82) to create a truck loading bay for the expansion of Rose City Shoppingworld shopping centre. On 27 October 2015, No. 82 was demolished. In March 2015, a $1 million restoration of Plumb's Chambers commenced.

== Description ==
Plumb's Chambers comprises two distinct buildings situated on the south side of Fitzroy Street overlooking Leslie Park, about half a block west of the corner of Palmerin Street, the main street of Warwick. Across Haig Avenue to the west is the Warwick Court House and Police Station. The larger of the Plumb's Chambers buildings is a two-storeyed sandstone structure with single-storey wings to the rear, and a two-storeyed verandah to the street. It has shops to the lower level and residential accommodation above. Across a narrow laneway to the east is a brick building with a narrow timber upper level and similar two-storeyed verandah, with a series of timber outbuildings to the rear.

The larger building is constructed of tooled sandstone blocks laid in ashlar coursing. It has a hipped corrugated iron roof with acroteria to the gutter corners. Penetrating the roof is a sandstone chimney with a cornice and three arched cowls. To the northern or street elevation, the two-storeyed timber verandah which overhangs the footpath, has a skillion roof and boarded ends. Set on stone plinths, the stop-chamfered posts to the lower level are topped with timber cornices, and have a slatted valance above. The upper level balustrade, now clad in fibrous cement sheet appears to have a dowelled balustrade concealed beneath. The posts of the upper level are finished with scrolled timber brackets below the roof beam.

The street elevation at ground level has three separate entries and windows. To the western end is a four-panelled door with tilting fanlight beside a small vertical sliding sashed window. To the centre is a similar door, with "Plumb's Chambers" painted to the fanlight, and a group of three windows beside. To the eastern end is a timber shopfront which angles back to the recessed entry of panelled French doors. The underside of the verandah is of ripple iron with internal gutters and a moulded plaster cornice at the wall. The verandah is accessed at the upper level by four pairs of glazed French doors. Only the stonework to this street elevation has been painted.

All four sides of the two-storeyed section show cross-plates with tie rods stabilising the upper level. Windows to the side and rear elevations are vertical sliding sashes with projecting stone sills. To the rear is a single-storey skillion wing of stone with a recess clad in weatherboards for a back door and windows. There is a later single-storeyed extension running perpendicular to the remainder, built of rendered masonry and weatherboards with a hipped corrugated steel roof.

Across the laneway to the east is the two-storeyed building with the lower level constructed of brick, and a narrow timber upper level to the street frontage. This upper level is clad in chamfer-boards with a hipped corrugated iron roof and casement windows. To southeast corner is an unpainted brick chimney with corbelled top. Overhanging the footpath is a two-storeyed timber verandah, similar in detail but smaller in proportion to that of the sandstone building. It is partially enclosed with slatted timber blinds.

The lower level is constructed of brick, some sections of which are painted. It is divided into two shops, each with a four-panelled entry door and tilting fanlight, and a large shopfront window (one of which has twelve panes, the other six). The rear section has a double gabled roof and central half-round gutter. To the west side is a brick chimney beside a further entry door. The rear of the building is also divided into two, with a skillion roof over separate boarded entry doors.

To the rear of this property are several outbuildings, including a weatherboard toilet with curved corrugated iron roof, and a chamferboard garage with a gabled roof.

== Heritage listing ==
Plumb's Chambers was listed on the Queensland Heritage Register on 3 November 1997 having satisfied the following criteria.

The place is important in demonstrating the evolution or pattern of Queensland's history.

Plumb's Chambers, comprising a brick and timber building possibly dating to the 1860s and an 1874–75 stone building, is important in illustrating the transformation of Warwick in the late 1860s and 1870s from a squatters' town to the principal urban centre of Queensland's most prosperous pastoral and agricultural district. The possibly c. 1860s brick building may represent the beginnings of this movement, and the 1874–75 building is indicative of Warwick's first building boom. Both buildings also illustrate a tradition of masonry construction in Warwick and district dating from at least the 1860s and sustained well into the early 20th century, which sets the district apart from any other in Queensland.

The place demonstrates rare, uncommon or endangered aspects of Queensland's cultural heritage.

The 1874–75 building survives as an excellent example of a substantial, two-storeyed, stone building with commercial premises on the ground floor and residence on the first floor, designed to impress and inspire confidence. Few buildings of this type and material have survived in Queensland, and even fewer Georgian-styled stone shop-houses in Queensland overlook a town square. The building provides rare evidence of the nature of the accommodation and work place of a successful 1870s business family in a developing Queensland rural town. More particularly, it is important in illustrating the nature of such buildings in a town in which stone and brick construction for commercial buildings was the norm at this period.

The place has potential to yield information that will contribute to an understanding of Queensland's history.

Both buildings are important in illustrating the design, materials and construction techniques of mid-19th century masonry building in Queensland, and both have potential to reveal further information about 19th century stone and brick construction.

The place is important in demonstrating the principal characteristics of a particular class of cultural places.

Both buildings are important in illustrating the design, materials and construction techniques of mid-19th century masonry building in Queensland, and both have potential to reveal further information about 19th century stone and brick construction. The 1874–75 building survives as an excellent example of a substantial, two-storeyed, stone building with commercial premises on the ground floor and residence on the first floor, designed to impress and inspire confidence.

The place is important because of its aesthetic significance.

Both buildings occupy a prominent role in the streetscape along Fitzroy Street between Guy and Palmerin Streets, and the pitch of the roofs contribute to the unity of the street.

The place has a special association with the life or work of a particular person, group or organisation of importance in Queensland's history.

The 1874–75 building is significant also for its close association with Warwick chemist and seedsman David Clarke, who made a substantial contribution to the expansion of agriculture in the Warwick district in the 1860s and 1870s.
