= Warwick Smith =

Warwick Smith may refer to the following people:

- Warwick Smith (curler) (born 1971), Scottish curler
- Warwick Smith (politician) (born 1954), Australian politician
- George Warwick Smith (1916–1999), Australian public servant
- John Warwick Smith (1749–1831), British watercolour landscape painter and illustrator
- Francis Smith of Warwick (1672–1738), English master-builder and architect
