= John Warwick (disambiguation) =

John Warwick was an actor.

John Warwick may also refer to:

- John Warwick Montgomery, American academic
- John G. Warwick, American politician
- John Warwick (Nova Scotia politician)
- John Warwick (MP for Cambridge), MP for Cambridge (UK Parliament constituency)
- John Warwick (MP for Northamptonshire), 1401–1406 MP for Northamptonshire (UK Parliament constituency)
- John Warwick (MP for Totnes), in 1406 MP for Totnes
