= Warwick Airport =

Warwick Airport may refer to:

- Warwick Airport (Queensland) in Warwick, Queensland, Australia (ICAO: YWCK)
- Warwick Municipal Airport in Warwick, New York, United States (FAA: N72)
- T. F. Green Airport in Warwick, Rhode Island, United States (FAA: PVD)
