= Criterion Hotel, Warwick =

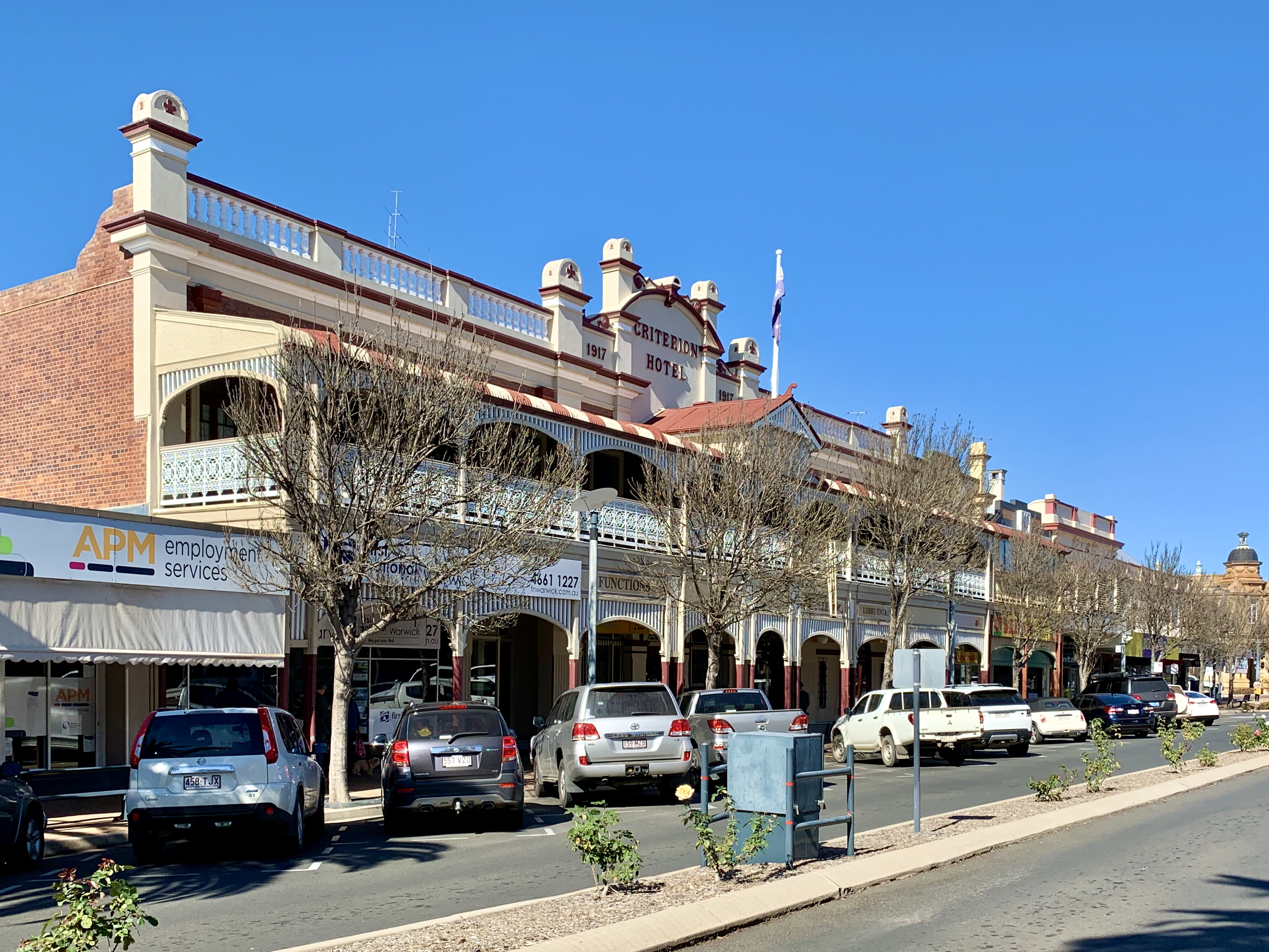
- Criterion Hotel, 2020

- Location within Queensland Location within Australia
- 28.2155°S 152.0332°E
- Location: 84 Palmerin Street, Warwick, Southern Downs Region, Queensland, Australia

History
- Design period: 1914–1919 (World War I)
- Built: 1917–1917

Site notes
- Architect: Dornbusch & Connolly
- Architectural style: Federation Filigree

Queensland Heritage Register
- Official name: Criterion Hotel
- Type: state heritage (built)
- Designated: 21 October 1992
- Reference no.: 600962
- Significant period: 1910s (fabric); 1917–ongoing (historical use)
- Significant components: lead light/s, shop/s, furniture/fittings
- Builders: Connolly & Bell

The Criterion Hotel is a heritage-listed hotel at 84 Palmerin Street in Warwick, Queensland, Australia. It was designed by Dornbusch & Connolly and built in 1917 by Connolly & Bell. It was added to the Queensland Heritage Register on 21 October 1992.

== History ==
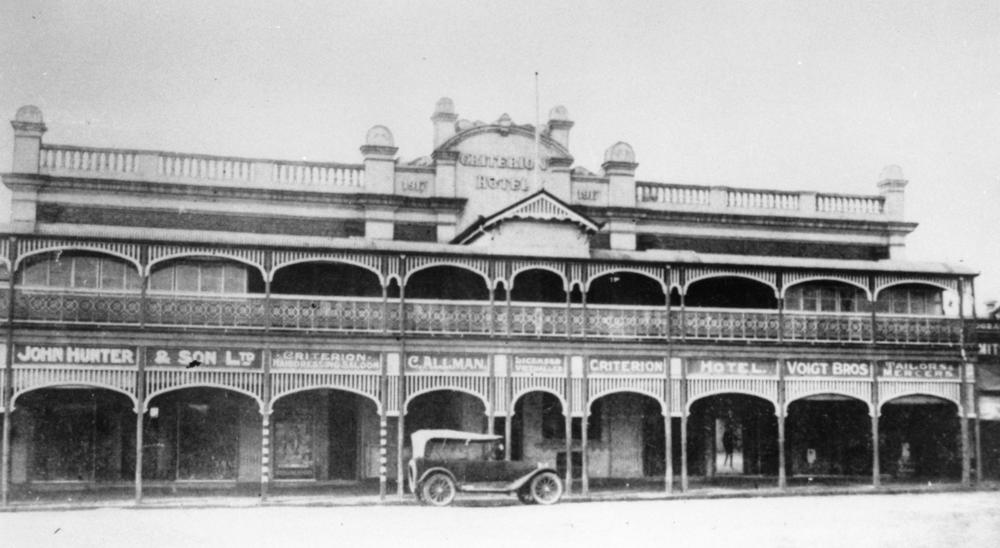
Criterion Hotel in Warwick, ca. 1925

This two-storeyed brick hotel, prominently situated in Palmerin Street, the main street of Warwick, was erected in 1917 for the Allman family.

It replaced a single-storeyed timber hotel, known also as the Criterion, which existed on the site from the 1860s, owned by David Bugden. Records indicate that although Bugden apparently left the Criterion in mid 1872, he retained ownership of the property and the hotel continued to be operated by members of the Bugden family until the early 1880s, then by JW Quinn until the mid 1880s.

The hotel was acquired by Jeremiah Allman in 1887. Born in Ireland, Allman arrived in Australia in the mid 1860s, establishing himself on the Darling Downs and acquiring a hotel in Stanthorpe in the early 1870s. At around this time Allman married Mrs Mary Dwan, a Warwick widow and licensee of the Sportsman's Arms Hotel in Albion St, Warwick. The Allmans remained at the Sportsman's Arms until they moved to the Criterion Hotel in the mid 1880s.

From the mid 1880s, Allman was also actively involved in the development of Warwick. Allman was elected an alderman of the Warwick Town Council in 1886, remaining with the Council until 1903 and serving as Mayor in 1895 and 1902.

Mary Allman died in 1898. Some time after this Allman remarried to Catherine King, also known as Kate.

In 1899 a notice appeared in the Warwick Argus advising that the goodwill and plant of the Criterion had been purchased by Perkins and Co, the reason for the sale given as Allman had decided to take a long holiday. The sale does not appear to have eventuated however, as there is no record of such transfer on the title documents.

Another notice appeared in the Warwick Argus in 1900 from J Allman to inform customers and the public that "having purchased the above hostelry, he has had the premises thoroughly renovated, rendering the CRITERION one of the best appointed hotels in the district".

The license of the hotel was transferred to Kate Allman in December 1908, prior to Allman's death in September 1910. Subsequent to Allman's death the property was transferred to Allman's son Daniel, Patrick Joseph Dalton and John Logan. During the early twentieth century the Allman family also owned the National Hotel and leased the Langham Hotel in Warwick.

Tenders for a new (brick) Criterion Hotel were called by Warwick architects Dornbusch and Connolly in December 1912, and again in March 1916. The estimated price of the new hotel was £12,000.

By February 1917 the original hotel had been demolished to make way for a more palatial structure. Erection of the new hotel was in progress by March that year, and it was noted that "even at this early stage the big structure has quite altered the aspect of Palmerin-Street ... An examination of the hotel shows it has been designed on most modern methods, the general arrangements being very up-to-date. When completed the new Criterion will be one of the most imposing and finest hotels in the State". The contractors for the hotel were Messrs Connolly and Bell.

The ground floor of the new building also included shops to either side of the main Palmerin Street entry, and by the end of July 1917, letting notices for the shops in the new Criterion buildings appeared in the local press.

The hotel remained in the Allman family until 1968. The hotel subsequently had a number of owners before being acquired by the present owners in 1989, by which time it is understood that the hotel was in poor condition. Alterations undertaken to the hotel at this time included the reorganisation of the main bar area and bar furniture to create two separate bar areas.

== Description ==
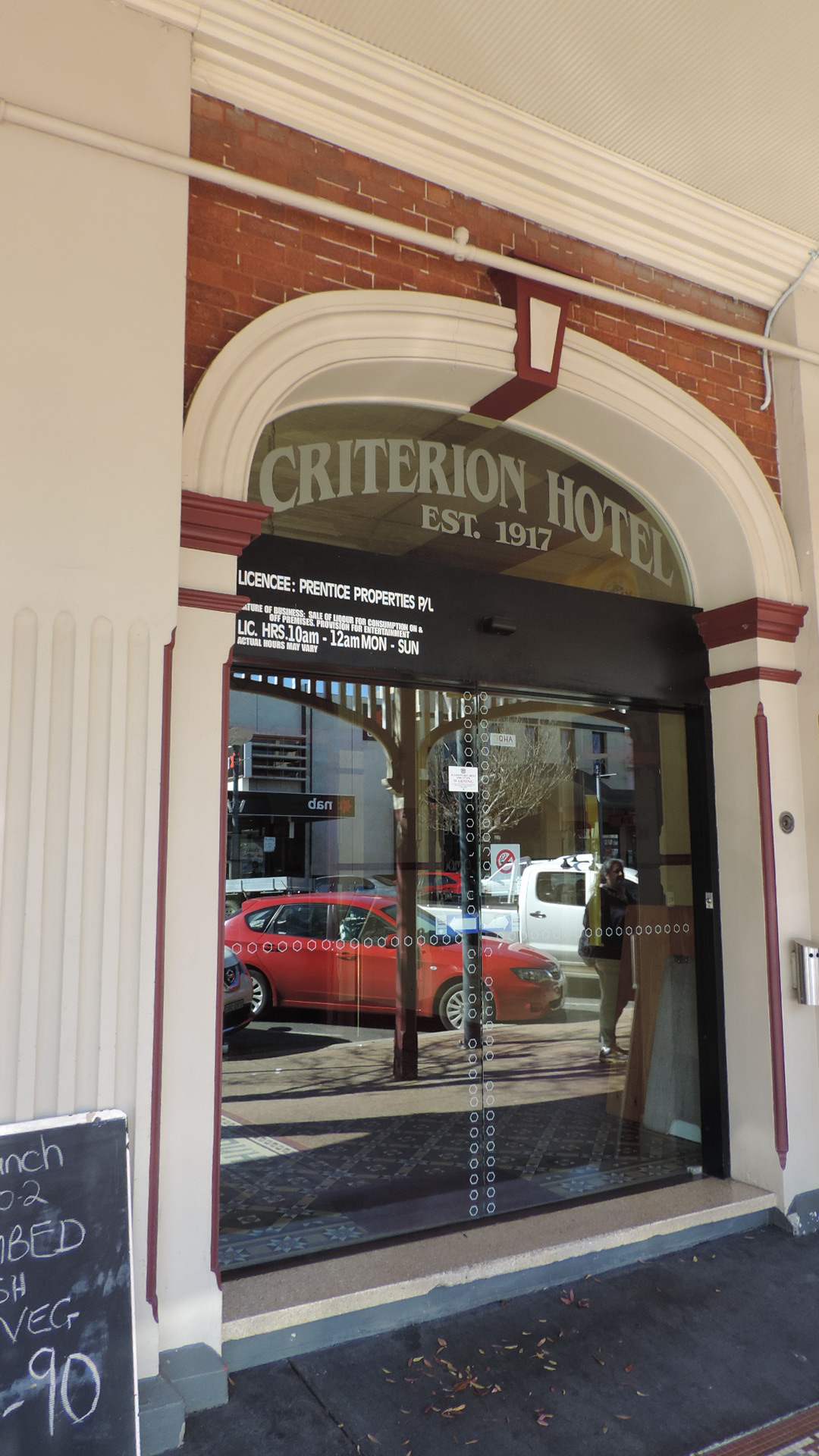
Main entrance, 2015

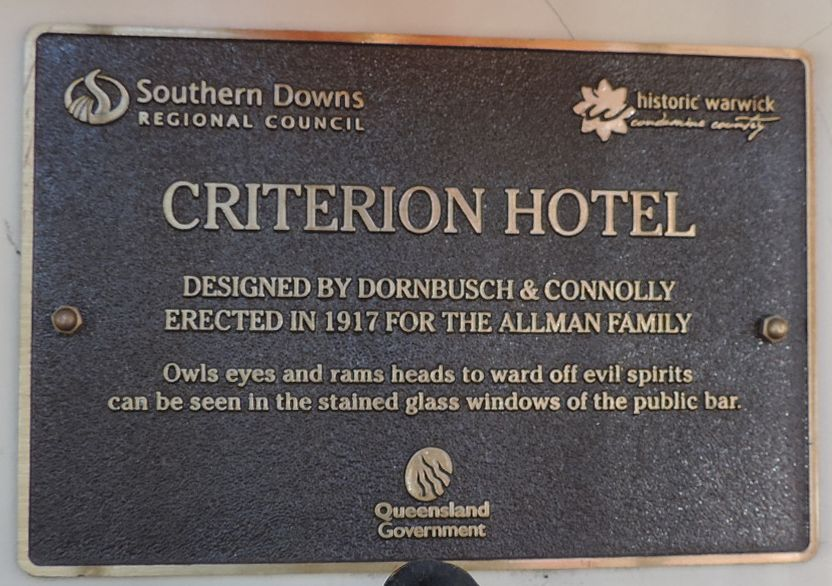
Plaque at Criterion Hotel, 2015

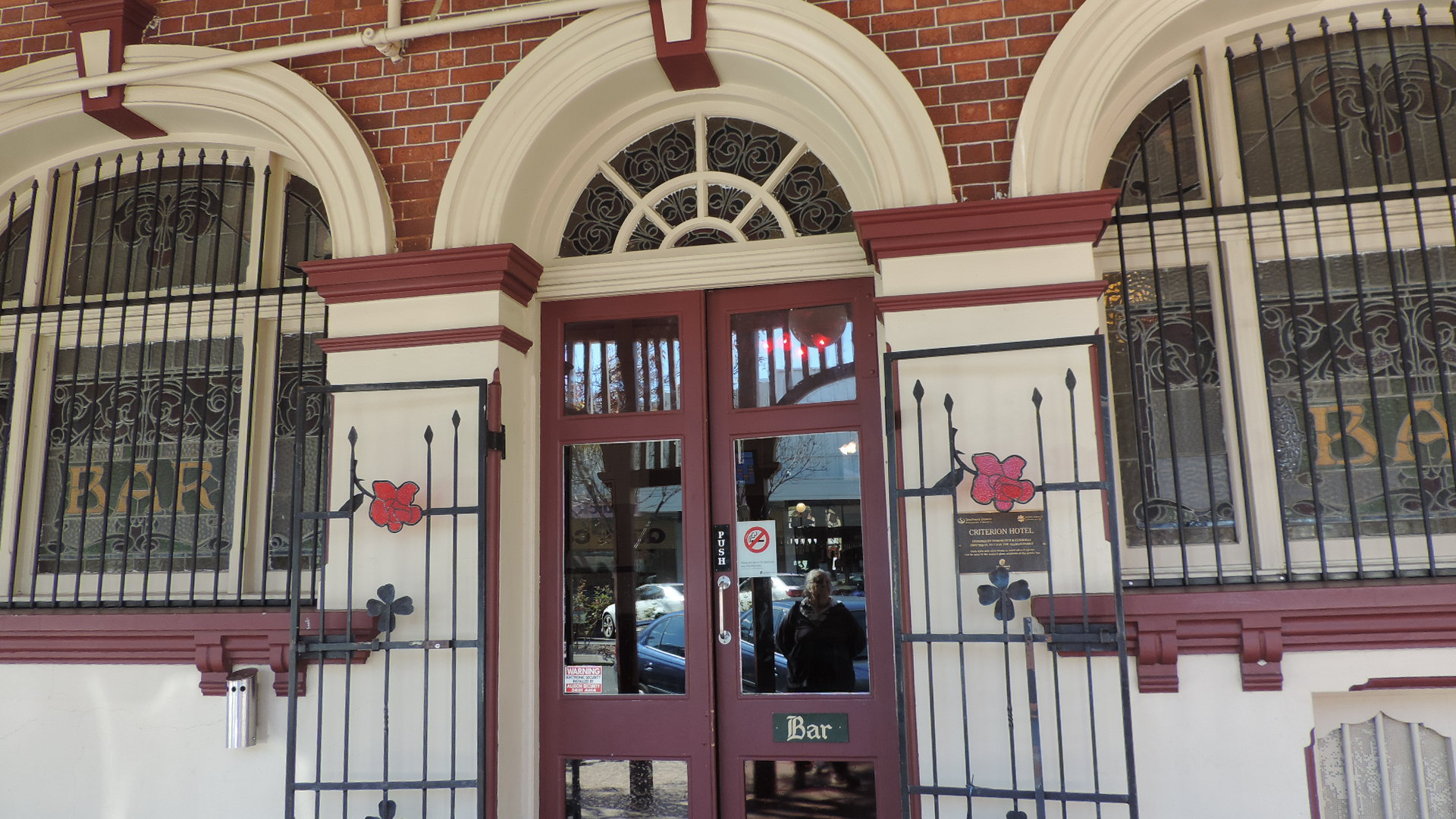
Leadlight windows with owls and rams' head

The hotel is a two-storeyed brick building, with a principal western facade addressing Palmerin Street, the main street of Warwick. The long street frontage features a two-storeyed filigree verandah running its full length with a masonry parapet above, whose central bay announces the hotel's name, and 1917 as its date of construction. Behind the parapet is a meandering mostly-hipped corrugated iron roof, over the main wing and the three perpendicular accommodation wings running east. At ground level, the street frontage has a series of decorated entries to the different areas of the hotel and an adjoining tenancy.

The stop-chamfered timber posts of the verandah are paired at the ends and the three central bays. Arched between these posts on both levels is a slatted timber valance. To the upper level is a cast iron balustrade with a clover leaf motif to the centre of each panel. The underside of the verandah is clad in ripple iron, with gutters to its internal perimeter. The verandah has a corrugated iron bull-nosed roof with a gabled entry porch over the central bay.

The external walls are unpainted brickwork, with painted plaster ornamentation to the western facade. The openings to the lower level of this facade are decorated with moulded plaster archways with keystones, cornices and projecting window sills and are separated by fluted pilasters. There is a series of entrances which, beginning from the north, lead to a tenancy, a blocked shopfront possibly also a former tenancy, the Public Bar, the Stair Hall leading to the accommodation wings, and the Lounge Bar which leads into the Bistro area. The recessed entry vestibule leading to the Stair Hall features tessellated floor tiles. The main bedrooms open onto this verandah. The painted pilasters continue through the first level separating the doorways to the Bedrooms of this wing. Above the verandah roof is a rendered entablature and balustraded parapet with pedestals topped also with a clover leaf motif.

The rear wings are generally of unpainted brickwork, including several brick chimneys decorated with cornices and corbels. Each wing is terminated with a timber lean-to, housing the amenities. The verandahs of these wings have cast iron balustrades matching that of the western verandah.

The Public Bar features a silky oak bar with a curved central bay and mirrored shelving behind. The style of the bar matches that of the Lounge Bar, though the end bays are not consistent. This supports the possibility that the two bars were once part of the same public bar and have been rearranged and relocated. The Public Bar also has leadlight windows, and a pressed metal ceiling featuring the face of the "Virgin Mary" keeping watch over the patrons.

The Stair Hall also has several moulded plaster archways. The polished cedar stair has moulded square balusters, carved newels and a panelled spandrel beneath. The stair is dog-legged, with leadlight windows to the landing.

From the Stair Hall, entry to the Lounge Bar is through a doorway in a glazed timber bar screen. The bar, similar in style to that of the Public Bar, has a curved corner to the eastern end and a timber bar screen to western end, which is similar to the screen of the doorway. There is a pressed metal ceiling and cornice, forming coffers between the beams. Beyond the Lounge is the Bistro area which also has a pressed metal ceiling with borders, cornices and roses. From here several French doors lead into beer garden courtyard.

In the central wing across the courtyard is the laundry, the kitchen and the former Dining Room now used for serving breakfast. This wing is approached from the Stair Hall along a timber verandah which continues around the wing. The upper level of this verandah also has a ripple iron soffit with internal gutters.

The main stair arrives at the First Floor in the upper Stair Hall which has moulded archways less ornate than that of the lower level. From the mid-landing is a smaller stair of similar detail, which leads to the upper level verandah. From the Stair Hall run two corridors through the accommodation wings, a lounge leading to the western verandah, and the former Lobby and Ballroom which are now part of the manager's residence.

The bedrooms in the accommodation wings typically have low-waisted four panel doors with tilting fanlights. The rooms and corridors have pressed metal ceilings and a variety of plaster and timber archways. Exit doors commonly have coloured glass upper panels and flush lower panels.

The hotel retains a substantial amount of its internal joinery including the main staircase, although some has been relocated within the hotel. There is also an extensive range of pressed metal ceilings, including the unusual "Virgin Mary" motif in the Public Bar.

== Heritage listing ==
The hotel was listed on the Queensland Heritage Register on 21 October 1992 having satisfied the following criteria.

- It is important in demonstrating the evolution or pattern of Queensland's history: The erection of the hotel in 1917, replacing an earlier hotel building, is important in demonstrating the high level of building activity in Warwick town during the early twentieth century when many of the general stores and hotels were re-built or renovated. The Criterion Hotel has an association with the Allman family, who ran other hotels in Warwick during this period, and who were actively involved in the development of Warwick from the 1880s.
- It is important in demonstrating the principal characteristics of a particular class of cultural places: The hotel retains a substantial amount of its internal joinery, and includes an extensive range of pressed metal ceilings.
- It is important because of its aesthetic significance: Prominently located within the business centre of Warwick, this substantial brick hotel contributes to the Palmerin Street streetscape and the Warwick townscape.
