= James Charles Burnett =

Australian surveyor (1815–1854)

- Born: c. 1815; United Kingdom
- Died: 18 July 1854 (aged 38–39); Brisbane, Colony of New South Wales
- Occupation: Surveyor

James Charles Burnett (c. 1815—18 July 1854) was a surveyor and explorer in Colony of New South Wales (including the area of Queensland), Australia. He was the head of the first Survey Office established at Brisbane in 1844.

(Note, the separation of Queensland from New South Wales did not occur until 1859 and so the name "Queensland" was not used in Burnett's lifetime.)

== Early life ==
Burnett was born in either in London or Edinburgh, the eldest son of Scottish parents William Burnett (1788–1858) and Marjory Chalmers Brown. He emigrated as a young child with his family to New South Wales in 1829 where his father established Burnettland near Raymond Terrace in the Hunter River district.

== Surveying career ==
In 1834 Burnett entered the service of the Survey department of New South Wales, aged just 15, spending a considerable period in the Illawarra district. Burnett was selected by Sir Thomas Mitchell to lead a survey to trace the Great Dividing Range from south of Hanging Rock northward towards Moreton Bay. Burnett set off in October 1841 with Roderick Mitchell (son of Thomas Mitchell) as second-in-command of the party. After many difficulties, the range was traced to about the 30°S and then the party headed for Brisbane arriving September 1842.

In 1845, he was appointed a Commissioner of Crown Lands.

Burnett subsequently undertook surveys of the Clarence River and Richmond River. In 1846, he was appointed in charge of the surveys in Moreton Bay and settled in Brisbane. In 1846 to 1847 he explored north of Moreton Bay in the area of the Mary River (Mary being the name of the colonial governor's wife.) and Burnett River. His works were praised. His efforts in exploring Queensland (as it is now known) were recognised by New South Wales Governor Charles FitzRoy by renaming the Boyne River as the Burnett River, and the surrounding area after Burnett. Burnett had earlier named the Fitzroy River, now-Rockhampton after the governor.

In 1848 he surveyed the settlement of Drayton, but it was noted "he loved Drayton, but said at least 100 times over it had been planned in the wrong place".

== Later life ==
Burnett starting purchasing lands about the colony. His residence itself was on 19 acres (7.7 ha).

Burnett died on 18 July 1854 aged 39 years at his home in Brisbane, Colony of New South Wales. For several months prior to his death, he had poor health, which was attributed to his "enthusiastic and almost reckless devotion to the trying duties of his profession" – although attributed to "a disease brought on by exposure in an open boat for 28 days". He had not left his home for several weeks prior to his death. Burnett was buried in the Church of England section of the North Brisbane burial ground (now underneath the Lang Park stadium).

He was survived by relative George Graeme Burnett, of Burnetland. His deceased estate included small lots of wine, a dray, a lifeboat (with oars), and a skiff.

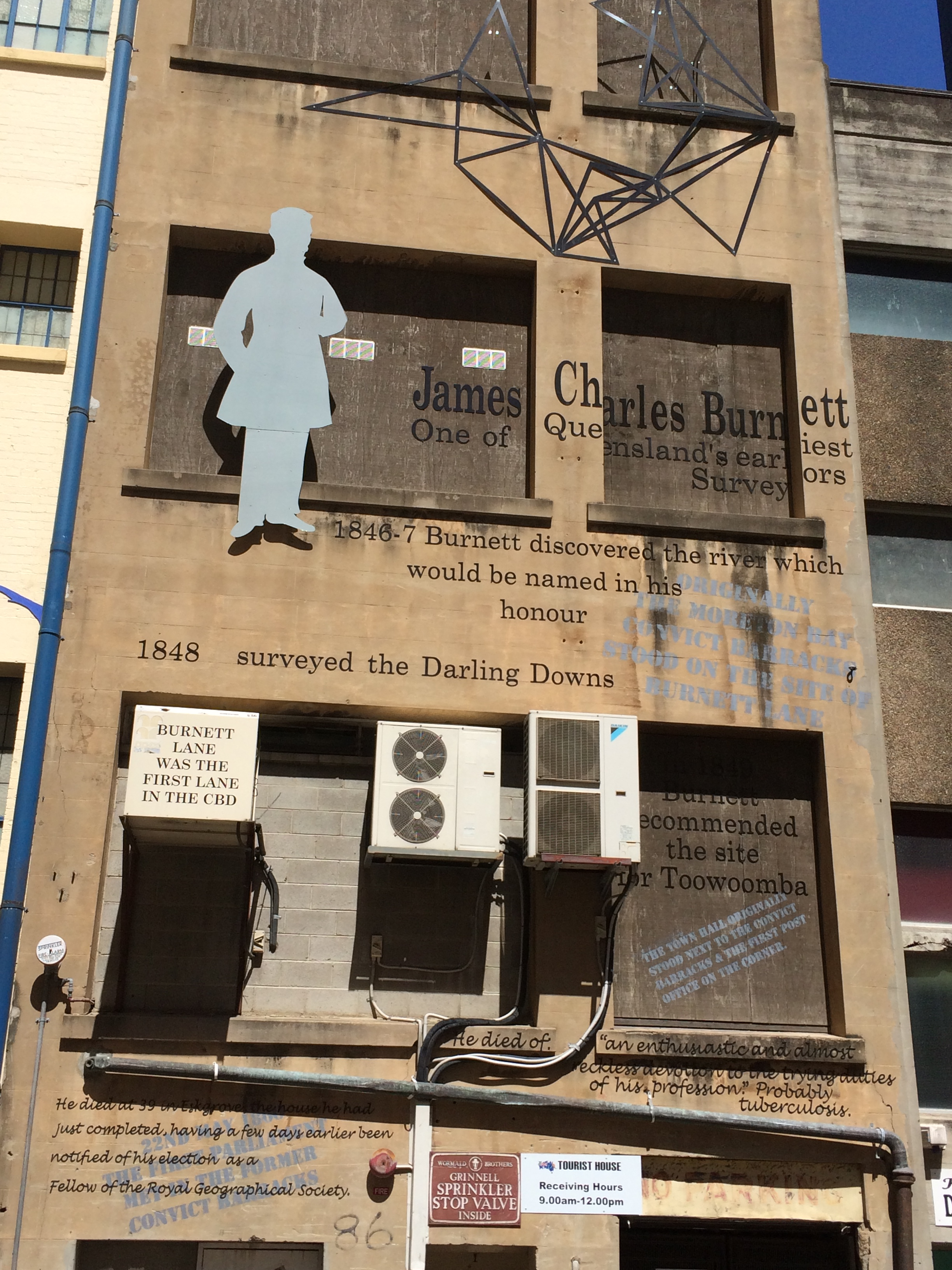
James Charles Burnett is commemorated with street art in Burnett Lane, Brisbane, 2015

== Legacy ==
A few days before Burnett's death, he received word that he had been elected a Fellow of the Royal Geographical Society.

At the time of his death, it was proposed a public subscription be established to create a lasting memorial to him, but this did not occur. However, in 1988, the Institution of Surveyors Australia erected a plaque honouring Burnett on the Wide Bay Highway, Ban Ban Springs (25.6819°S 151.8161°E) through which Burnett had passed in March 1847 while exploring the Burnett River district.

A sonnet was also composed in his name in 1857.

Bundaberg's 8 kilometres (5.0 mi) James Charles Burnett Walkway was opened in July 1988 in Midtown Riverside Park to commemorate his 1847 surveying party journey into the area.

=== Place names ===
Places named after Burnett include:

New South Wales

- Burnett County, New South Wales

Queensland

- Burnett Lane, Brisbane. Visual artist Natalie Billing used the rear of a building by 2015 to create a tribute to Burnett.
- Burnett River, which he discovered in 1847
