= National Hotel, Warwick =

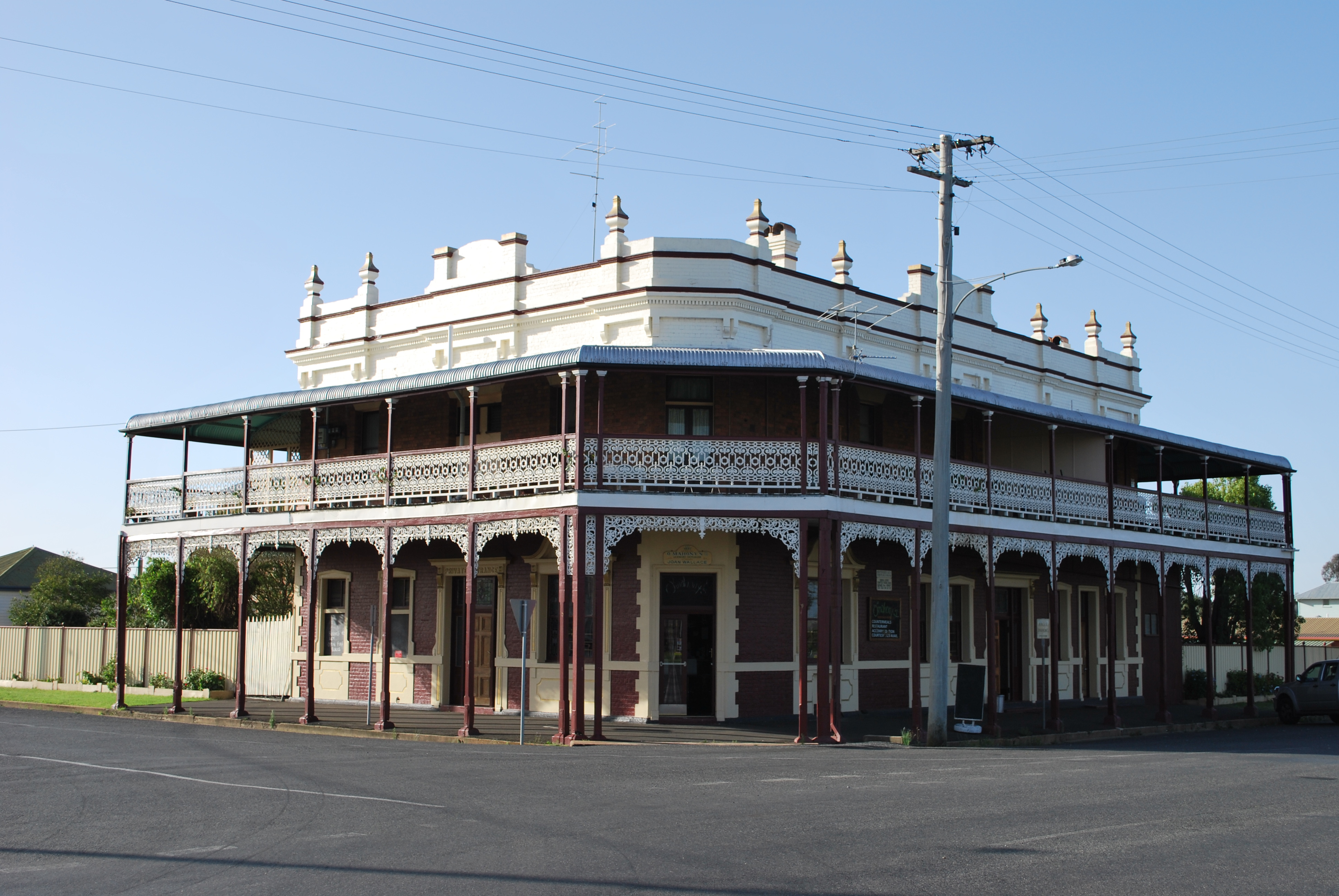
- National Hotel, trading as O'mahony's Hotel, 2008

- Location within Queensland Location within Australia
- 28.2168°S 152.0396°E
- Location: 35 Grafton Street, Warwick, Southern Downs Region, Queensland, Australia

History
- Design period: 1900–1914 (early 20th century)
- Built: c. 1907–1937

Site notes
- Architect: James Marks and Son

Queensland Heritage Register
- Official name: National Hotel, Allman's Hotel
- Type: state heritage (built)
- Designated: 21 October 1992
- Reference no.: 600950
- Significant period: 1900s, 1930s (fabric) c. 1907–ongoing (historical use as hotel)
- Significant components: lead light/s, out building/s
- Builders: Daniel Connolly

National Hotel is a heritage-listed hotel at 35 Grafton Street, Warwick, Southern Downs Region, Queensland, Australia. It was designed by James Marks and Son built in 1907 by Daniel Connolly. It is also known as Allman's Hotel. It was added to the Queensland Heritage Register on 21 October 1992.

== History ==
The National Hotel was constructed in Warwick in about 1907 for Daniel Allman to designs of James Marks and Son, architects of Toowoomba.

Warwick was established as an administrative centre of the emerging Darling Downs regions in 1847, with a post office being established in the town in 1848. This year saw the first survey work of the embryonic town completed by surveyor, James Charles Burnett, with further surveys in 1850, and the first sale of crown land in July 1850. On 25 May 1861 Warwick was granted the status of a municipality (the Borough of Warwick). The town continued to grow throughout the nineteenth and early twentieth century. The development of the South-Western railway line from Toowoomba in 1867 and its extension through to Stanthorpe in 1881 when tin was discovered contributed to Warwick becoming a major service and trade centre on the Darling Downs.

The property on which the National Hotel was built, situated diagonally opposite the Warwick railway station was acquired by Deed of Grant to William McGarry in June 1858. In 1884 Bishop Edward Tufnell was paying rates for the property which was described as simply "fenced" and he continued this ownership until 1893, during which time the railway station was constructed opposite the hotel.

The first railway terminal at Warwick was built on a site on the northern fringe of Warwick and was moved to its present site in 1887 when the line was extended through to Stanthorpe. At this time the present passengers' station and goods' shed were constructed. 1887 is the date marked on the parapet of the National Hotel however this is not the date of the construction of the building and it is unclear to what the date does refer.

The National Hotel was built by the Allman family who were prominent in Warwick for many years. Jeremiah Allman arrived in the town in about 1870 aged 28, when he married the owner of the Sportsman's Arms Hotel, a Mrs Mary Dwan. Allman moved to Stanthorpe some years later when the Stanthorpe tin mines were flourishing, and bought another hotel after which he removed to Toowoomba where he ran the Harp of Erin Hotel. In the late 1870s Allman returned to Warwick and the Sportsman's Arms Hotel. In 1887 he bought the Criterion Hotel in Palmerin Street one of the oldest and best known establishments in the town. In 1917 he rebuilt the Criterion and this substantial masonry building is extant today.

Allman took a keen interest in the social and political affairs of Warwick. He was elected as an alderman of the Warwick Town Council in 1886 and remained on the Council until 1903 serving as mayor in 1895 and 1902. He was an active member of the Warwick Coursing Club and the Hibernian Society. Allman's active involvement in matters of Warwick progress resulted in the establishment of the Warwick Butter Factory, which he at least partially funded and he was also involved with the Warwick Hospital. He had five children from two marriages.

Jeremiah Allman acquired the property on which was later built the National Hotel in Grafton Street in 1897, after the death of the previous owner, Bishop Edward Wyndham Tufnell in 1893. Jeremiah leased the property to his son, Daniel Francis Allman on 5 March 1907. In February of that year the younger Allman applied to the Warwick Licensing Court for hotel premises to be erected opposite the railway station gates, corner of Grafton and Lyon Streets. The plans provided for a two-storey building with 16 bedrooms and handsome fronts to two streets.

The architects commissioned to design this hotel were James Marks and Son who were partnership formed by the prolific Toowoomba architect James Marks and his elder son, Harry James Marks undertook many substantial building projects in Toowoomba, including the St Patrick's Roman Catholic Cathedral and St Stephen's Presbyterian Church, along with many hotels including the Imperial Hotel in Ruthven Street, the Globe Hotel also in Ruthven Street. Marks and Son also designed many regional hotels and churches on the Darling Downs.

The hotel designed for Daniel Allman by Marks and Son and opened by early 1908 was a two storeyed masonry building, constructed by local contractor Daniel Connolly, who later joined in partnership with Conrad Dornbusch forming Dornbusch & Connolly, a prominent architectural firm of Warwick. Donnolly's tender price of £3960 was accepted in April 1907 and one of the conditions by which a license was granted to Allman by the Warwick Licensing Court for the construction of the hotel was that it would be finished within 6 months from the hearing in April 1907.

On the death of Jeremiah Allman in September 1910, the National Hotel property was transferred to Daniel Allman and his brother John Michael Allman as tenants in common. In 1918 John Allman transferred his share in the hotel to a John Playford, who is listed as a Warwick farmer in previous Post Office Directories. On the death of Daniel Allman in July 1936 the property was transferred to his widow, Maria Allman. The property was then acquired by Queensland Brewery Ltd.

Minor changes were undertaken to the National Hotel in 1937. These were designed by Addison & Macdonald, an architectural partnership from Brisbane renowned for their work modernising many early hotels in south east Queensland during the inter-war period. A small addition was added to the underside of the verandah to the north of the ground level, housing an ironing and linen room.

The public bar has been internally re-arranged with a new bar which extends into the room less than the original but is of the same shape.

In 2015, it is trading as O'mahony's Hotel.

== Description ==
The National Hotel is situated on the corner of Grafton and Lyons Streets, some three blocks to the east of Warwick's main street. It consists of a two-storeyed brick main block with filigree verandahs to both streets frontages, a two-storeyed brick accommodation wing which runs west to the rear of the main block, and a small corrugated iron garage on the northern side. The building sits in the southern half of the property, with the now vacant northern half probably the former site of other outbuildings. To the east, across Lyons Street is the railway station complex.

The two-storeyed filigree verandah extends over the footpath to the south and part of the east side, then continues along the eastern and western facades. It has stop-chamfered timber posts which are tripled at the splayed corner. The upper level mostly has a cast iron balustrade, with a cast iron fringe and brackets below, but as the eastern verandah returns the balustrade becomes timber lattice with a boarded valance below. The verandahs have a bull-nosed roof with shaped rafters, and a ripple iron underside with internal gutters to its perimeter. To the street facades above the verandah is an articulated parapet with cornice, pedestals and urns, and at the centre of the eastern side the date of 1887. Behind the parapet are two parallel hipped corrugated iron roofs forming a central gutter. In contrast, the roof to the west wing is a single hipped roof. There is also several brick chimneys with corbelled tops and terra-cotta cowls.

At ground level the street facades have plaster mouldings including window and door surrounds, and quoining to the corners. Here, the brickwork between has been painted, but otherwise it is unpainted, laid in English bond. There are two entrances with "PRIVATE ENTRANCE" lettered in the architraves above the door. These are centrally located on each street facade, with panelled doors and leadlight side and toplights. There is also a further entry at the splayed corner which leads to the Public Bar. Although substantially remodelled, the Public Bar retains its pressed metal ceiling with beam surrounds, cornices and roses.

From both private entrances, generous corridors lead to a central arched vestibule which features moulded pilasters and archways with keystones. Adjoining is the main stair in polished cedar, with square moulded balusters and carved newels. The Stair Hall is lit by a stained glass leadlight window. Beside the Stair Hall is the Dining Room which also retains its pressed metal ceiling with cornices, borders, beam cladding and roses. There is a timber chimney piece and hatch to the Kitchen. Other ground floor rooms formerly the Parlour, the Smoking Room and the Lounge also retain their pressed metal ceilings, but have altered layouts partly because of the addition of toilets.

The First Floor of the main block is generally accommodation. The rooms to the southern end have been divided off as the Manager's Residence, but generally retains its layout and pressed metal ceilings and cornices.. There is a Lounge located centrally at this level, from which lead several corridors to the verandahs and to the west wing. Generally at this level, there are pressed metal ceilings and cornices through the halls and bedrooms. The doors are low-waisted four panel doors with tilting fanlights. To the north-eastern corner of the verandah is an external timber stair with moulded square balusters, square newels with ball motifs, and boarded spandrel, all less decorative than the main stair.

The west wing brickwork is laid in stretcher bond, which is different to that of the main block. Entrance at both levels is via a timber connection from the main block with the upper level being enclosed. From each entrance runs a central corridor with bedrooms to either side, with some rooms having been converted to bathrooms. To the exterior of the northern facade is a simple timber escape stair.

The building is substantially intact both internally and externally, with only minor alterations being made to the layout. It retains much of the pressed metal ceilings and joinery. Of the outbuildings, only one survives as the present garage, which was possibly the former laundry.

== Heritage listing ==
National Hotel was listed on the Queensland Heritage Register on 21 October 1992 having satisfied the following criteria.

The place is important in demonstrating the evolution or pattern of Queensland's history.

The National Hotel, a substantial masonry building, provides evidence of the growth of Warwick during the early years of this century.

The place is important in demonstrating the principal characteristics of a particular class of cultural places.

The hotel is a good example of a substantially intact hotel of the early twentieth century in Queensland, and contributes to the nearby railway precinct.

The place is important because of its aesthetic significance.

The hotel is a good example of a substantially intact hotel of the early twentieth century in Queensland, and contributes to the nearby railway precinct.

The place has a special association with the life or work of a particular person, group or organisation of importance in Queensland's history.

The building is associated with the prominent architectural firm based in Toowoomba, Marks and Sons.
