= Warwick Town Hall =

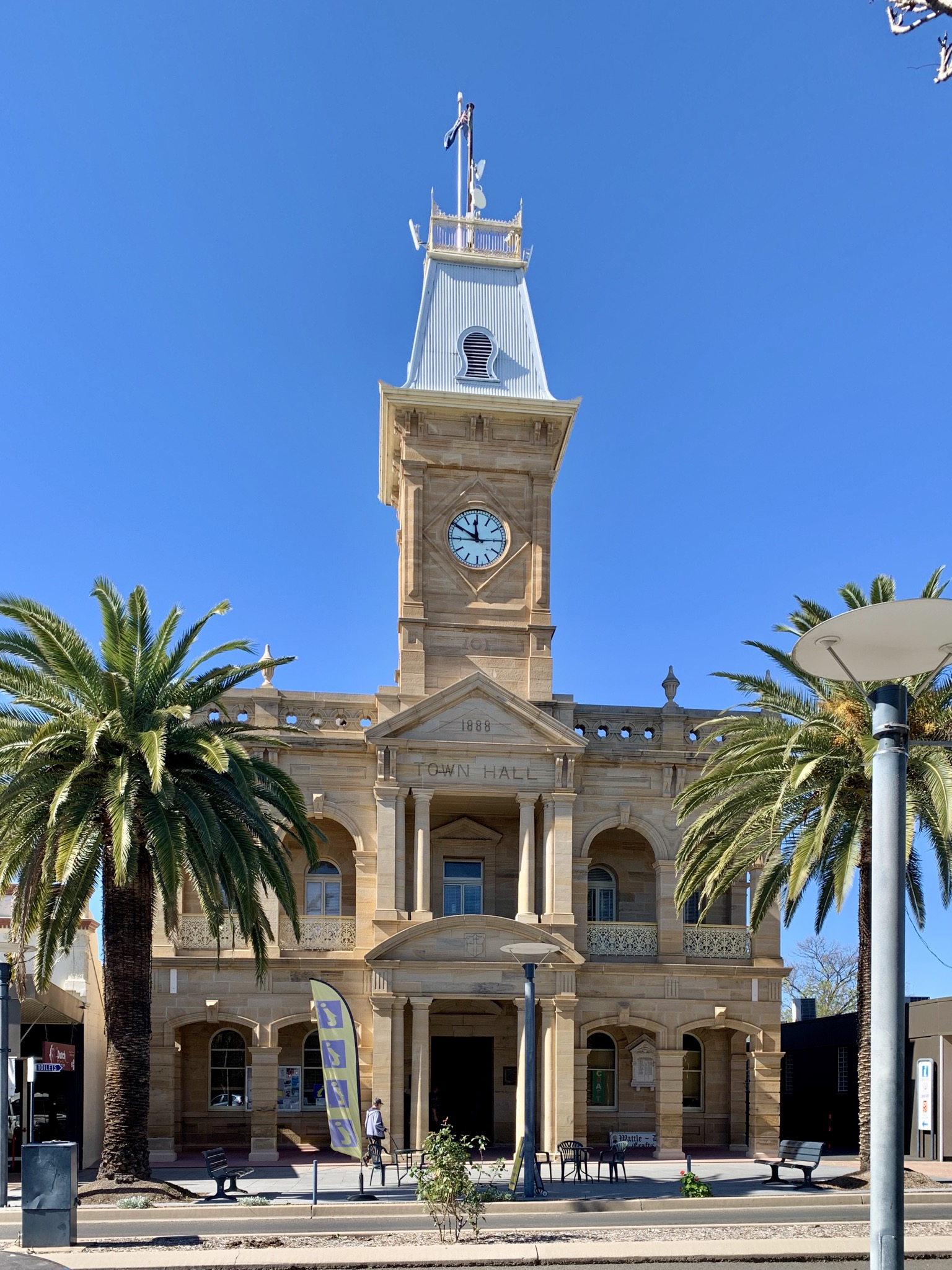
- Warwick Town Hall, 2020

- Location within Queensland Location within Australia
- 28.2152°S 152.0335°E
- Location: 72 Palmerin Street, Warwick, Southern Downs Region, Queensland, Australia

History
- Design period: 1870s–1890s (late 19th century)
- Built: 1887–1917

Queensland Heritage Register
- Official name: Town Hall and Footballers Memorial
- Type: state heritage (built)
- Designated: 21 October 1992
- Reference no.: 600961
- Significant period: 1880s–1890s; 1910s (fabric); 1887–1975 (historicall); 1888–ongoing (social)
- Significant components: tower – clock

Warwick Town Hall is a heritage-listed town hall at 72 Palmerin Street, Warwick, Southern Downs Region, Queensland, Australia. It was built from 1887 to 1917. It is also known as Footballers Memorial. It was added to the Queensland Heritage Register on 21 October 1992.

== History ==
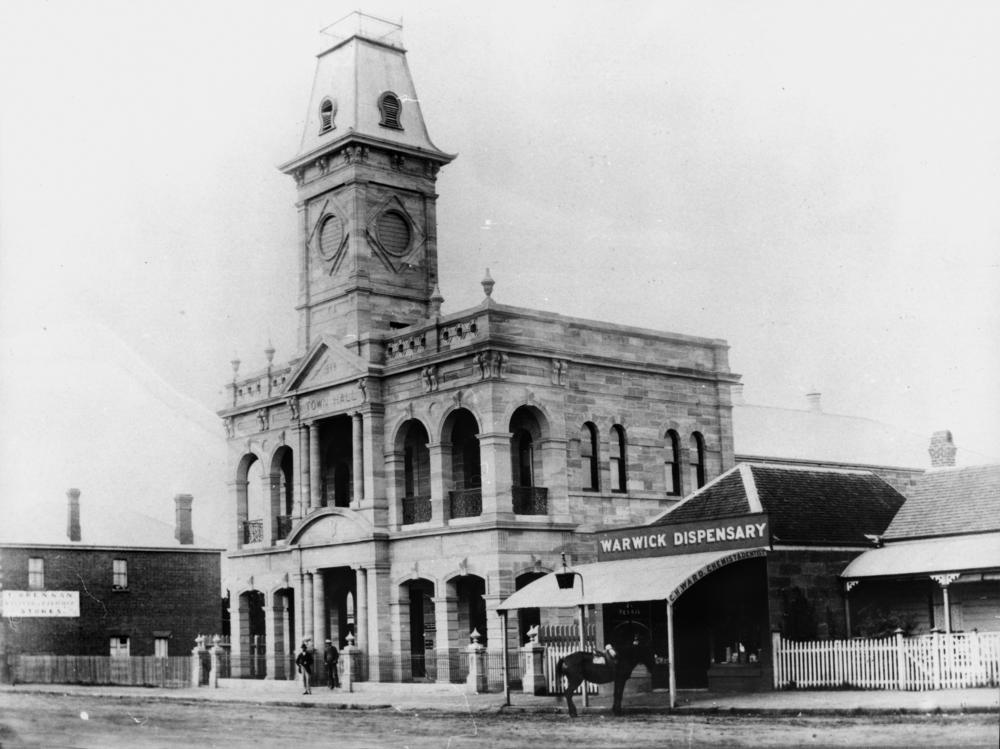
Warwick Town Hall and adjacent shops, circa 1890

Officially opened on 1 October 1888 by Mayor of Warwick, Arthur Morgan, this sandstone building survives as evidence of the consolidation of Warwick as a business and administrative centre for the surrounding district during the late nineteenth century.

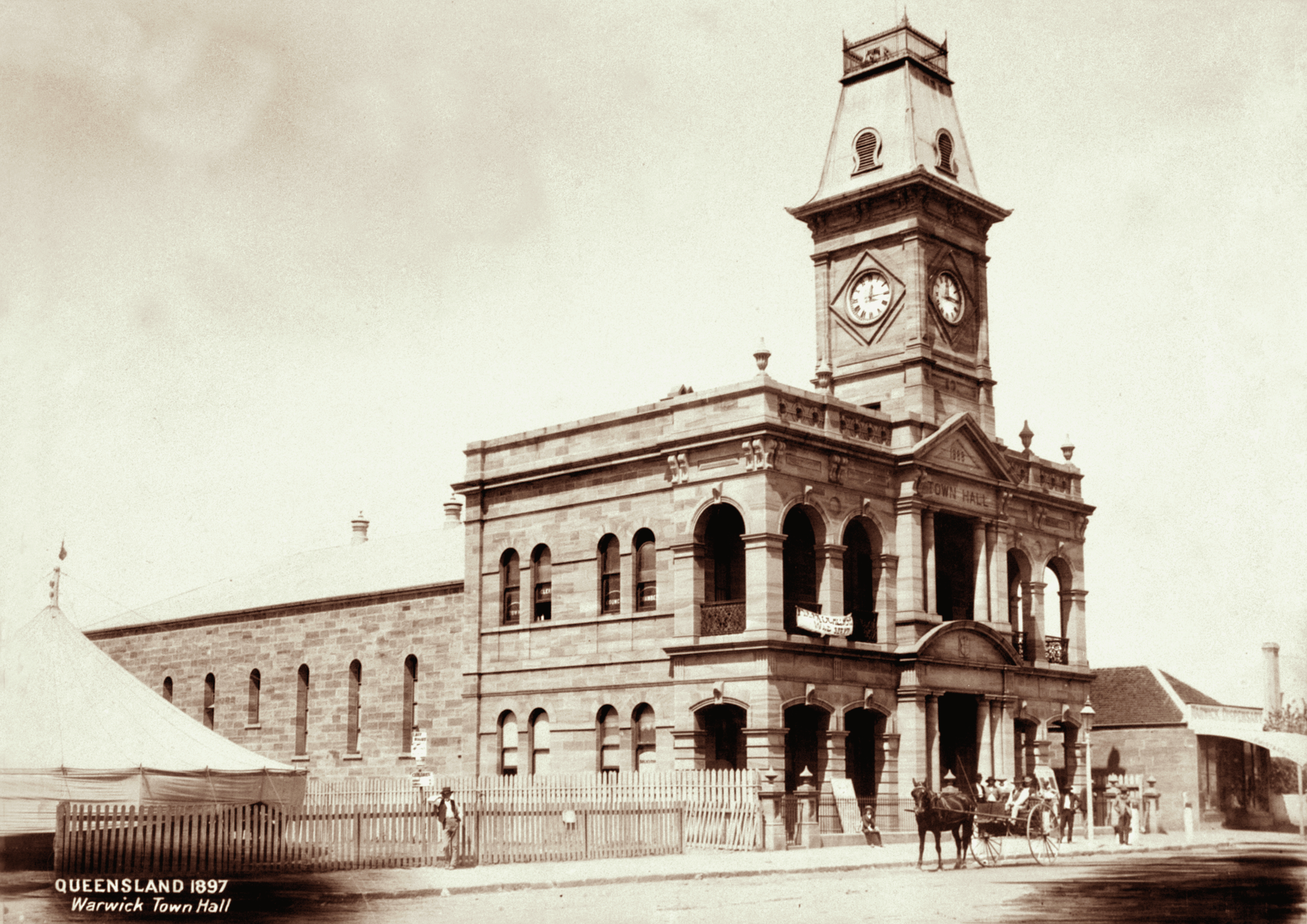
Warwick Town Hall, 1897

Warwick township developed slowly during the 1850s and by 1857 the population of the parish of Warwick had reached just over 1,300. Under the provisions of the 1858 Municipalities Act (NSW), any centre with a population in excess of 1,000 was entitled to petition the colonial government for recognition as a municipality. Brisbane was the first town in what was soon to become Queensland to receive municipal status under the 1858 Act, and was proclaimed Borough of Brisbane on 7 September 1859.

By 1859, the year of separation of Queensland from New South Wales, the township of Warwick was recognised as a major urban centre on the Darling Downs, and when Queensland's new electoral districts (settled areas only) were proclaimed on 20 December 1859, the electorate of the Town of Warwick had its own representative in the Legislative Assembly.

In February 1861 a petition calling for municipal status for the town of Warwick, with 110 signatures appended, was sent to the Queensland Governor, and on 25 May 1861 the Borough of Warwick was proclaimed a municipality under the 1858 NSW legislation. The municipal boundary followed the original Warwick Town Reserve of five square miles. Warwick was the fifth corporation created in Queensland outside of Brisbane, being preceded by Ipswich, Toowoomba, Rockhampton and Maryborough. The first Warwick municipal election was conducted on 5 July 1861, and at its first meeting on 15 July 1861, the Warwick Municipal Council elected John James Kingsford as the first mayor of Warwick.

In 1861 the first Warwick Town Hall was established in a slab building at the northern end of Albion Street, which had been constructed in the early 1850s as Warwick's first Court House. In 1873 the Council purchased the Masonic Hall, a brick building in Palmerin Street, and this served as the Warwick Town Hall until imposing new premises were constructed in 1887.

A competition for the design of the new Town Hall was held in 1885, expenditure not exceeding £3 500. First place in the competition was won by Clark Bros, a partnership formed in Sydney in 1883 between architect brothers John J and George Clark; the design by Clark Bros coming closest to Council's budget. However it was the design of second place getter Willoughby Powell which although more costly, was eventually chosen for the new Town Hall.

Powell had arrived in Queensland c. 1873, and practiced as an architect until c. 1913. During Powell's architectural career in which he alternated between employment in the Queensland Public Works Department and periods of private practice, he was responsible for the design of a number of substantial buildings in Toowoomba, Maryborough and Brisbane including churches, private residences, shops, hotels, and the Toowoomba Grammar School. Powell was also responsible for the winning design in a competition for the (third) Toowoomba City Hall, although he subsequently had to give up supervision of its construction to Toowoomba architects James Marks and Son in order to take up an appointment in the Works Department.

Tenders for the building were called in 188?. Although tenders were called for brick and stone, Council accepted the tender of Michael O'Brian for a stone building, and the contract with O'Brian was signed in March 1887. Shortly after the commencement of construction, O'Brian advised the Council he was insolvent, and arranged for the firm of Stewart, Law and Longwill to take over the work. The stone work was sub-let to John McCulloch, a Warwick stonemason responsible for the stone work on a number of prominent buildings in the town including Pringle Cottage, the Warwick Court House, St Mark's Anglican Church, St Andrews Church, Warwick Central State School, Our Lady of Assumption Convent), the goods sheds at Warwick railway station and the former Albion Street Post Office.

The foundation stone of the new Town Hall was laid in August 1887 by Lady Griffith, wife of then Premier of Queensland, Sir Samuel Walker Griffith. A bottle, sealed with the Corporation seal and containing a copy of a commemorative scroll, copies of the local papers and coins, was placed in a cavity in the stone.

A clock tower was not part of Powell's original design for the new Town Hall. In late 1887 however, it had been suggested that the building would be enhanced by the addition of a clock tower. At a meeting of ratepayers in December 1887, a vote was carried in favour of the addition of a tower which was subsequently incorporated into the building. The clock itself was not installed until c. 1892. As part of the striking apparatus, it is understood that the Council acquired a bell from St Mary's Church in Warwick which was eventually installed on the outside of the tower.

Occupied by the Council from September 1888, the new Town Hall was formally opened in October that year by the Mayor of Warwick, Arthur Morgan. The event was marked with a concert given by the local Philharmonic Society. In his remarks, Morgan described the new Town Hall as "...a credit to the town and If there were any truth in the saying that the history of a town was known by the character of its buildings, then the Municipal Council of Warwick had no reason to be ashamed of the page they had contributed to the history of their town".

Gas lighting was installed in the building in 1889, subsequently replaced by electricity c. 1912.

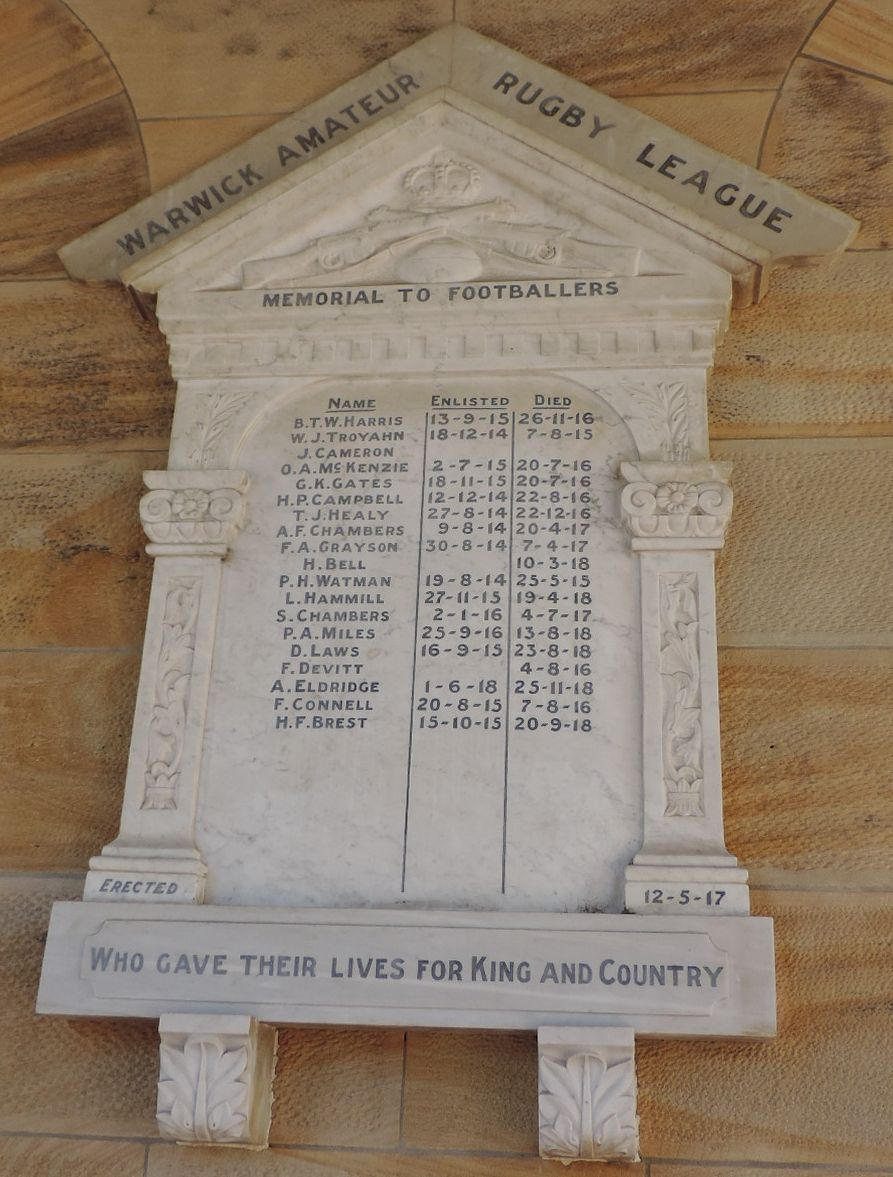
Footballers memorial, 2015

In early 1917 a movement was initiated by James Brown, Patron of the Warwick and District Amateur Rugby Football League, to erect a memorial to honour the Warwick league football heroes, who have given their lives for their King and country (and those who may yet fall). A committee was formed, subscriptions collected and a tablet unveiled at a ceremony in May 1917. Inscribed with names and placed at the entrance to the Town Hall, the tablet was the work of Warwick masons Troyahn, Coulter and Thompson. In unveiling the tablet, the then Mayor of Warwick Ald. Gilham drew contemporary parallels between war and sport, suggesting that There were worse places for young fellows to be than on the football field and places that were not such good training grounds to fit the young fellows for service to the Empire. It was said that Waterloo was won on the cricket fields of England. Probably some of the glories of the war had been contributed to, and to some extent made possible by, the previous practice the boys had received on the football fields of sunny Queensland.

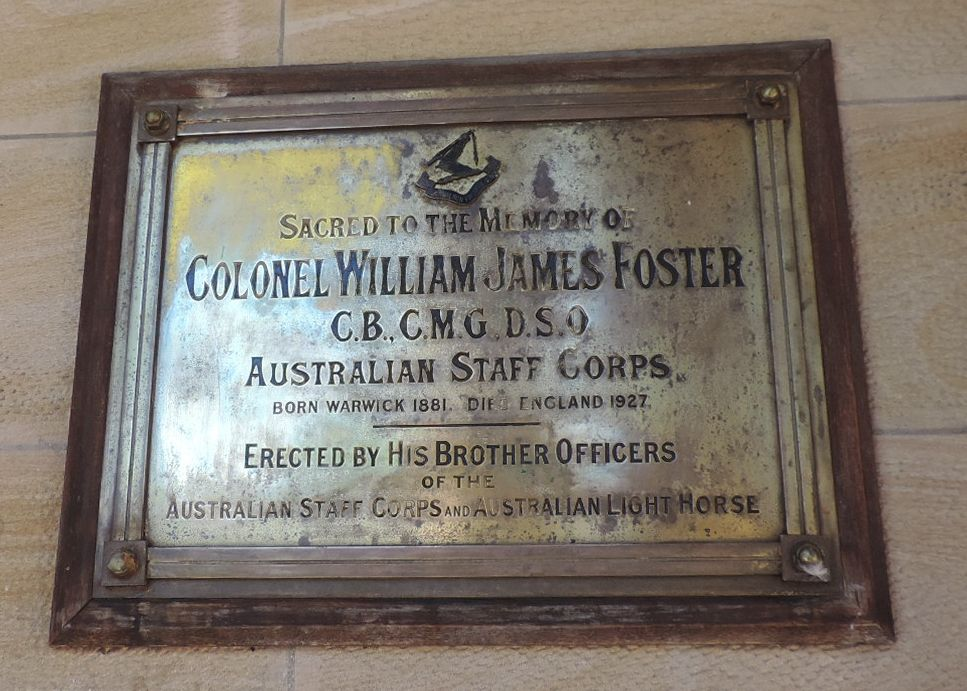
Memorial to Colonel William James Foster, 2015

A tablet/plaque to the memory of Colonel William James Foster CB, CMG, DSO, Australian Staff Corps is also located at the entrance to the Town Hall. Colonel Foster was born in Warwick in 1881 and died in England in 1927. The memorial was erected by Colonel Foster's Brother Officers, Australian Staff Corps and Australian Light Horse.

In October 1935 Warwick celebrated (prematurely) 75 years of municipal government, and at this time the local press popularised the idea of the town being proclaimed a city. Under the provisions of the Local Government Acts, Queensland Cabinet approved the granting of city status to Warwick on 2 April 1936, and this was celebrated in the new City of Warwick on 29 June.

By the late 1960s, the Town Hall was considered generally inadequate for the purposes of the City Council. A new administration centre was erected at the corner of Fitzroy and Albion Streets, and the last meeting of the Council was held in the Town Hall in August 1975.

The hall was re-roofed in 1975, and a damp course inserted into the main building in 1976. The facades were cleaned in 1978, and the foyer and interior of the hall have been remodelled.

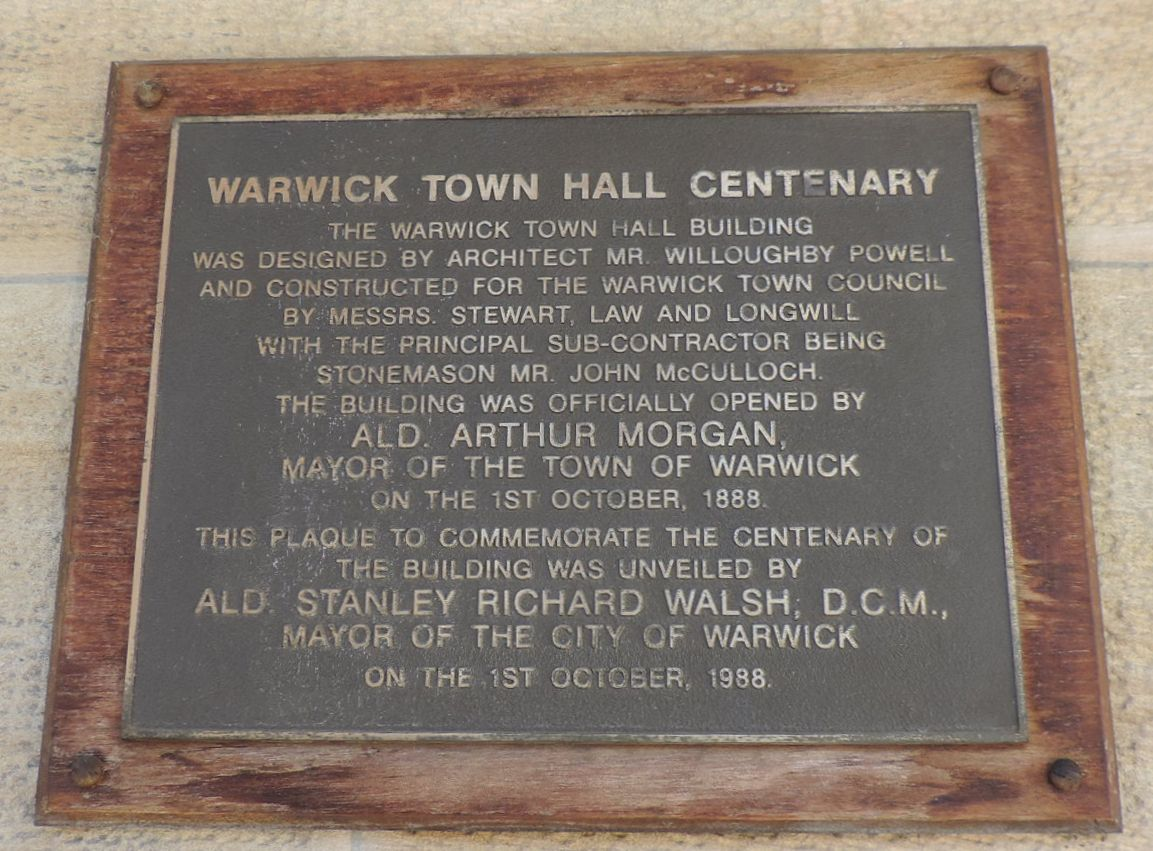
Plaque commemorating the centenary of Warwick Town Hall, 2015

On 1 October 1988, the centenary of the town hall was celebrated with a plaque commemorating the event. The plaque was unveiled by Mayor of Warwik, Stanley Richard Walsh. A path of trees was also planted in Apex Park (Victoria Park) to commemorate the occasion.

In July 1994 the Queensland Government amalgamated the City of Warwick and the surrounding Shires of Allora, Glengallan and Rosenthal to form the Shire of Warwick.

The former Council offices in the Town Hall are now occupied by the Warwick Education Centre. The Town Hall remains in use as a venue for community functions including flower shows, school plays and other entertainment.

== Description ==
The Warwick Town Hall is a two-storeyed sandstone building of Classical influence, with a symmetrical principal facade addressing Palmerin Street, the main street of Warwick. This main western facade has recessed colonnaded verandahs to both levels, and a central entry bay emphasised by an imposing clock tower. The stone is laid in ashlar coursing and mostly of tooled finish with polished trims. This western end of the building contains two levels of offices, behind which is the main hall with the stage at the eastern end. Beyond this is a single-storey timber extension of backstage areas.

The central bay to the street facade emphasises the entry with columns and pilasters of Tuscan order, and a segmental pediment with a shield motif at its centre. The upper level of this bay has similar columns and pilasters and a bracketed triangular pediment, with "1888" carved to its centre and "TOWN HALL" to its entablature. To either side at the lower level is a colonnade of segmental arches, and to the upper level is a recessed verandah of semicircular arches with cast iron balustrades and timber handrails. Above is a bracketed cornice and a stone parapet with circular openings, topped with urns. The clock tower is square in plan, with square pilastered corners and a clock face on all four sides. It is capped by a high-pitched truncated pyramid roof of corrugated iron, with horseshoe-shaped louvred vents, decorative iron cresting and a flagpole at its apex.

The lower colonnade has a concrete floor, boarded soffit, and single- pane vertical sash windows with semicircular heads. Within the colonnade are archways to either side of the entry forming a small vestibule. Mounted on the wall is the Footballers Memorial. The returns to this western facade are less ornate, with similar windows, projecting stone sills, string courses, and the continuing cornice and parapet. The exterior to the main body of the hall is less ornate again, with only projecting sills, tall awning windows also with semicircular heads, and a gabled corrugated iron roof with three decorative vents to its ridge. The roof behind the parapet to the western end is hipped, with a protruding stone chimney and dormer window. The chamferboard addition to the rear has an assortment of windows, and a corrugated iron lean-to roof with several skylights.

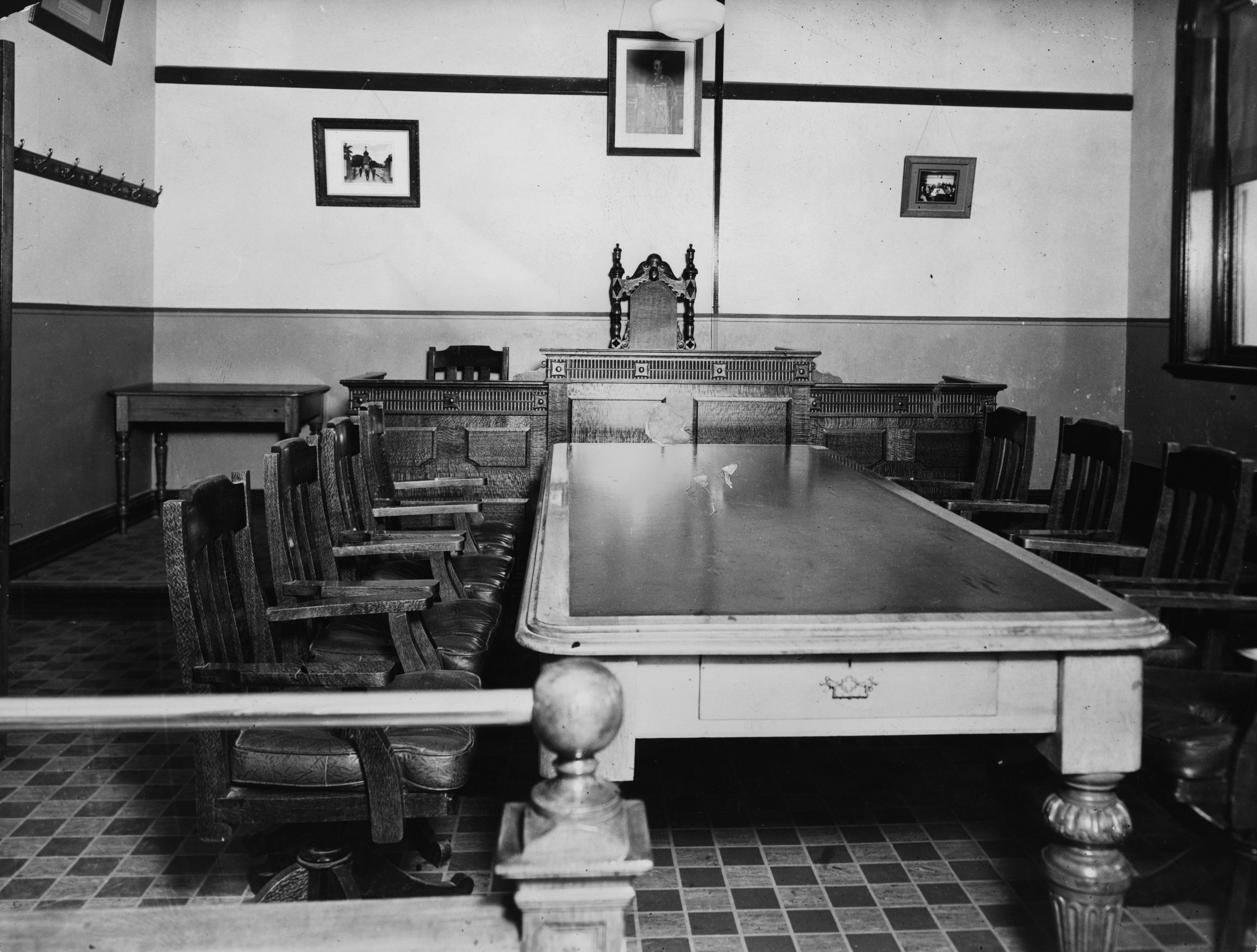
Council chambers inside the Warwick Town Hall, 1935

Entry to the building is through a pair of substantial six-panelled timber doors, which have a smaller segmental stone pediment over, and '"TOWN HALL" set into the threshold. The Entry Hall has several four- panelled cedar doors with glazed fanlights to offices on either side, and a moulded plaster archway leading to the cedar staircase up to the second level. This open-welled stair begins with a curtail step and handrail scroll, and features turned newels and balusters, and a boarded soffit lining. From the second landing is the entry to the Gallery through a similar doorway. At the top of the stair is a series of doorways to offices, formally the "Mayor's Room", the "Council Chambers" and the "Town Clerk", as announced by the painted signs on the doors' lock rails. Above this is a further stair of similar character but of lesser width which leads into the clocktower. The former Council Chamber has glazed French doors with semicircular fanlights leading onto the recessed verandah; a moulded cedar chimney piece; and two panelled cedar bulkheads to the Town Clerk's room, one of which still has its hinged panelled cedar dividing wall. Fixed to the south wall is a timber post, a remnant of a rail which has since been removed. The windows generally to the side wall also have semicircular heads. These rooms have boarded ceilings with fretted roses.

Beyond the stair lobby is a recently altered foyer space giving entry to the main hall. The foyer features two cast iron columns, with two more enclosed in glass cases built into the wall. Entry to the Hall is through a pair of timber doors with glazed panels etched with "TOWN HALL", which appear to have been repositioned into the new wall alignment. The hall itself is a long rectangular room with the stage at the eastern end. Tall narrow windows with awning sashes and semicircular heads punctuate the walls on both sides. The coffered ceiling is of wide beaded board with beaded timber-clad beams between, and a curved perimeter of narrow horizontal boards. There is a pressed metal ceiling rose in every second coffer. The hall contains a gallery to the western end over the entry foyer. The gallery has a wrought iron balustrade, and a pressed metal frieze along the fascia and return with brackets over the columns. There is an exit via a side door and a steel external stair.

The stage is of timber boards. Over the stage is a proscenium decorated with timber mouldings. Above the stage is a timber catwalk, from which can be seen the substantial timber king-post roof trusses.

Beyond the stage is a single-storey chamferboard extension on timber stumps, which houses backstage areas, change rooms, a meeting room and a kitchen. It has wall linings of fibrous cement and tongue-and groove boards. Parts of these areas have timber brackets and beads to the wall and ceiling linings painted to give these rooms something of a Tudor flavour.

=== Footballer's Memorial ===
On the external front wall of the hall is a marble plaque, the Warwick Amateur Rugby League War Memorial to Footballers. It lists nineteen footballers who lost their lives during the First World War. It is an honour board of classical influence with leaded lettering, and decorated with bas-relief carving. The base is supported by two brackets ornamented with acanthus leaves. Pilasters with Corinthian capitals and foliage motifs border the role, joined at the top by a dentil cornice. Above the cornice is a triangular pediment, within which are crossed rifles over a football and a crown at its apex.

== Heritage listing ==
Town Hall and Footballers Memorial was listed on the Queensland Heritage Register on 21 October 1992 having satisfied the following criteria.

The place is important in demonstrating the evolution or pattern of Queensland's history.

Officially opened in October 1888, this sandstone building survives as evidence of the consolidation and importance of Warwick as a business and administrative centre for the surrounding district during the late nineteenth century.

The place demonstrates rare, uncommon or endangered aspects of Queensland's cultural heritage.

The Town Hall is a rare surviving intact example of a nineteenth century town hall in Queensland.

Erected in 1917 at the main entrance to the town hall, the Footballers Memorial is an unusual example of a war memorial, reflecting the contemporary parallels drawn between war and sport, and providing a unique historical record of local participation and sacrifice in the First World War.

The place is important in demonstrating the principal characteristics of a particular class of cultural places.

Internally, the building retains much of its original layout, including timber joinery, and contains evidence via signage, of the allocation of functions and offices.

The tablet displays fine craftsmanship, and demonstrates the work of local stonemasons, Troyahn, Coulter and Thompson.

The place is important because of its aesthetic significance.

Situated within Palmerin Street, this substantial stone building contributes to the Palmerin Street streetscape and Warwick townscape.

The place has a strong or special association with a particular community or cultural group for social, cultural or spiritual reasons.

The building continues a long association with the Warwick community as a focal point for social and community functions.

The place has a special association with the life or work of a particular person, group or organisation of importance in Queensland's history.

The Warwick Town Hall has an association with the public work of architect Willoughby Powell, as one of a number of substantial public buildings in Queensland centres designed by Powell during the late nineteenth and early twentieth centuries.
