= Pringle Cottage =

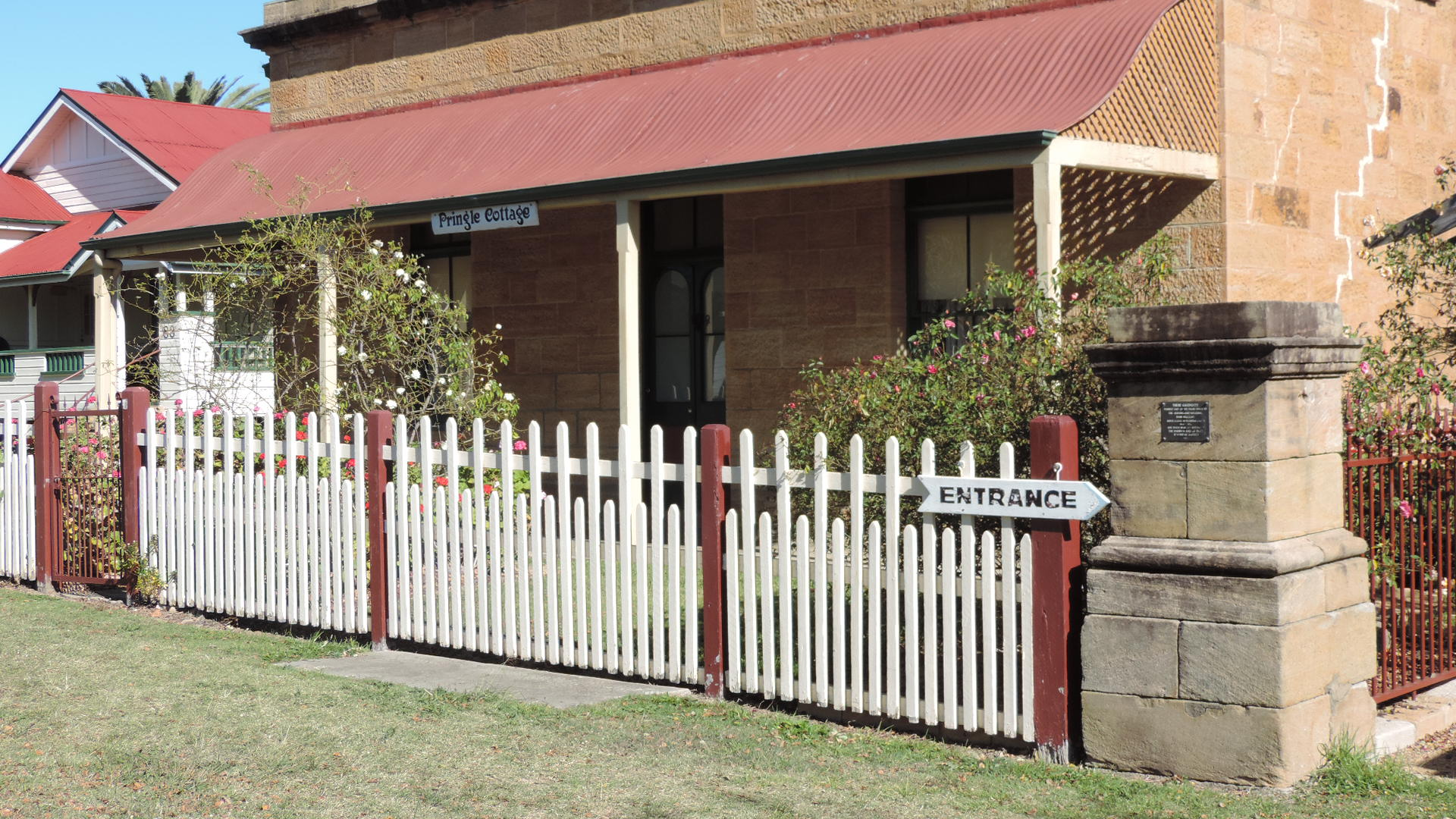
- Pringle Cottage, 2015

- Location within Queensland Location within Australia
- 28.2204°S 152.0267°E
- Location: 81 Dragon Street, Warwick, Southern Downs Region, Queensland, Australia

History
- Design period: 1840s–1860s (mid-19th century)
- Built: 1860s/1870s
- Built for: John McCulloch

Queensland Heritage Register
- Official name: Pringle Cottage, John MCulloch's Cottage, Milton College / Mountview, Miss Lukin's Boarding School
- Type: state heritage (built)
- Designated: 21 October 1992
- Reference no.: 600945
- Significant period: 1860s/1870s (fabric); 1860s/1870s–1900s (historical)
- Significant components: residential accommodation – main house, service wing, attic
- Builders: John McCulloch

Pringle Cottage is a heritage-listed cottage at 81 Dragon Street, Warwick, Southern Downs Region, Queensland, Australia. It was built from 1860s/1870s onwards by John McColluch. It is also known as John McCulloch's Cottage, Mountview, Milton College, and Miss Lukin's Boarding School. It was added to the Queensland Heritage Register on 21 October 1992.

== History ==
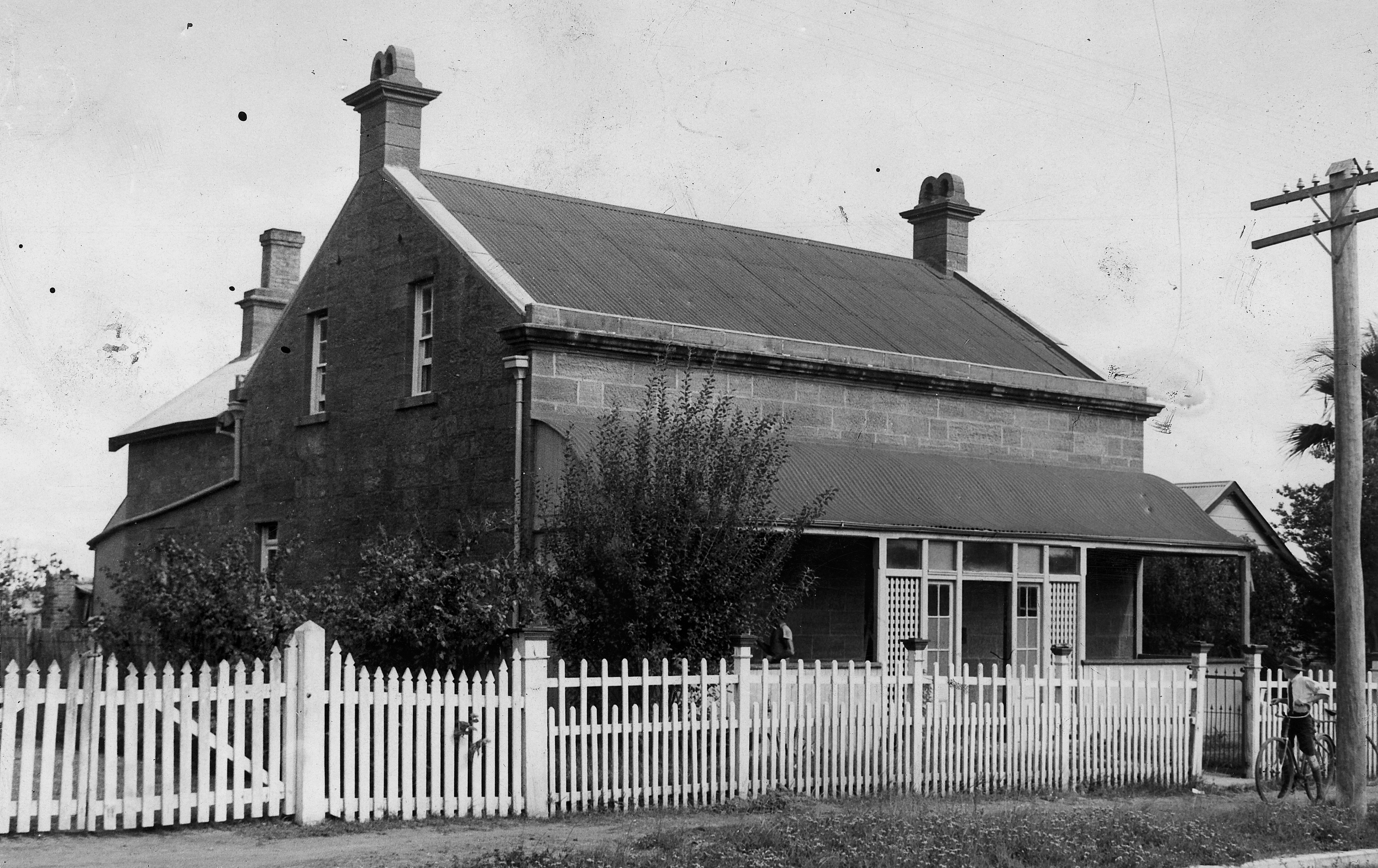
Pringle Cottage, 1942

Pringle Cottage is a two storeyed sandstone building, located within the Warwick and District Historical Society's museum grounds. It was built by a local stonemason, John McCulloch as his own residence in the 1860s or 1870s.

The land on which the cottage was built was first acquired by Deed of Grant by Edwin George Rigby in November 1862. This was transferred to John McCulloch in September 1863 when a new Certificate of Title was issued.

John McCulloch, a stonemason, arrived in Warwick in about 1862 and was responsible for the stone work of many of the sandstone buildings in the area including the Court House (1885); St Mark's Anglican Church (1874); St Andrew's Presbyterian Church (1869); Methodist Church (1875); and the Warwick Central State School (1874).

McCulloch is reported to be living in Warwick, as a stonemason, in the earliest Post Office Directory of 1868, although his address is not specified. Between 1871 and 1874 McCulloch borrowed about £950, and this may have been for the construction of his house.

The property passed from McCulloch's hands in March 1902 when it was transferred to Mrs Helen Devine, and then in April 1903 to Elizabeth Ann Devine. Archibald and Mary Crawford purchased the property in 1929, and it changes hands again in 1942 when Evan James William Mason acquires it.

Reputedly, a private school was run by a Mrs FS Pringle and her daughter, Miss FHM Pringle in the upper floor of the cottage from 1898 until at least 1905, when the last recorded break-up event was held.

In November 1979, the Warwick and District Historical Society took possession of the building and named the cottage after the Pringle family who operated the school. The society then developed the Pringle Cottage Museum on the land around the cottage.

== Description ==
Pringle Cottage is a two storeyed sandstone building, prominently situated facing Dragon Street, within the grounds of the Warwick and District Historical Museum, which comprises several other smaller buildings.

The building has a simple rectangular plan, with kitchen wing extension on the rear and a verandah on the eastern, entrance facade. The corrugated iron gabled roof runs north south, and is partially concealed by a moulded stone parapet on the eastern facade, behind which is a box gutter. Stone chimney shafts extend from the apex of the stone capped gable ends on the north and south elevations. The sandstone blocks used in the construction of Pringle Cottage are generally coursed rubble, with picked faces. The cottage sits on a plinth of margined rock faced sandstone.

The eastern facade of the cottage, which faces Dragon Street, is dominated by the ogee or double curved corrugated iron verandah, supported on chamfered timber posts. The returns of the verandah, above the line of the posts are infilled with timber lattice panels. A centrally located half glazed entrance door is flanked by two pane vertical sash window openings. These openings are all surmounted by transom lights, narrow over the windows and more generous above the door.

The northern facade of the building is a flush gabled sandstone wall, with two four pane vertical sash windows on the second floor and one on the ground floor. These openings, like others to the house generally, have sparrow picked sandstone quoining, margined on the opening edge, with a smooth faced sill, a sparrow picked stone lintel is surmounted with a simple voussoir detail. The western end of this wall is unfinished, with alternate sandstone blocks continuing on from the corner of the building. A recent infill section of timber boarding has been added to the north west corner of the building, aligned with the kitchen wing on the south west.

The kitchen wing, a two storeyed sandstone structure, attached to the rear wall of the cottage, has a corrugated iron roof, hipped on the edge nearest the cottage, and gabled at the other end. Again a sandstone chimney shaft, with brick extension, surmounts the apex of the gable. A corrugated iron enclosure is found on the western wall of the kitchen wing.

The double entrance door, which has round headed glazed cutouts, accesses a central hallway from which the major rooms on the ground floor are accessed as well as the stair. A round headed archway in the hallway separates the front two rooms from the rear section of the house. Generally the interior of the ground floor is of rendered masonry, masonry floor and plaster ceilings.

The interior rooms of the ground floor feature early chimney pieces, mantle pieces and cast iron fire grilles. The rooms are generally quite simple, with timber skirting boards, stained architraves and stained timber boarded ceilings.

A timber stair leads from the rear of the central hallway and winds at the top to a first floor space, from which the principal rooms on this floor are accessed. This stair has square sectioned balusters and a chamfered newel post.

The upper floor rooms have walls lined with fibrous cement boarding, timber floors and ceilings of timber boarding which rake toward the eastern and western ends of the building in accordance with the roof line. Early fitted floral carpet survives in one of the rooms on this floor.

The kitchen is accessed from the rear of the central hallway on the ground floor and has whitewashed stone walls, unlined timber ceiling and stone floor. There is a stone chimney piece on the western wall, to the south of which is a small doorway leading to a corrugated iron oven recess. A steep straight stair is on the eastern wall, and has open tread timber steps, square balusters and a simple handrail. The stair leads to a timber boarded room, with recent timber boarded raked ceiling, which is naturally lit by small windows on the western and southern walls.

== Heritage listing ==
Pringle Cottage was listed on the Queensland Heritage Register on 21 October 1992 having satisfied the following criteria.

The place is important in demonstrating the evolution or pattern of Queensland's history.

Pringle Cottage survives as an early sandstone dwelling in Warwick, and is important in demonstrating the pattern of development in Warwick as a residential location from the 1860s.

The place is important in demonstrating the principal characteristics of a particular class of cultural places.

The building, located within the Warwick and District Historical Museum, is important in demonstrating the principal characteristics of early domestic design and construction from sandstone as it developed in Warwick.

The place is important because of its aesthetic significance.

The simple, but harmonious, facade is an important and prominent feature of the Dragon Street streetscape.

The place has a strong or special association with a particular community or cultural group for social, cultural or spiritual reasons.

Pringle Cottage has strong associations with an early builder in Warwick, John McCulloch, who built the cottage as his own residence. As the home of the local historical society for sixteen years the building is important to the local community.
