= Warwick Museum =

Warwick Museum may refer to:

- Market Hall Museum, Warwick, England
- Pringle Cottage Museum, Warwick, Queensland, Australia
- Warwick Museum of Art, Warwick, Rhode Island, USA
