= Warwick Uniting Church =

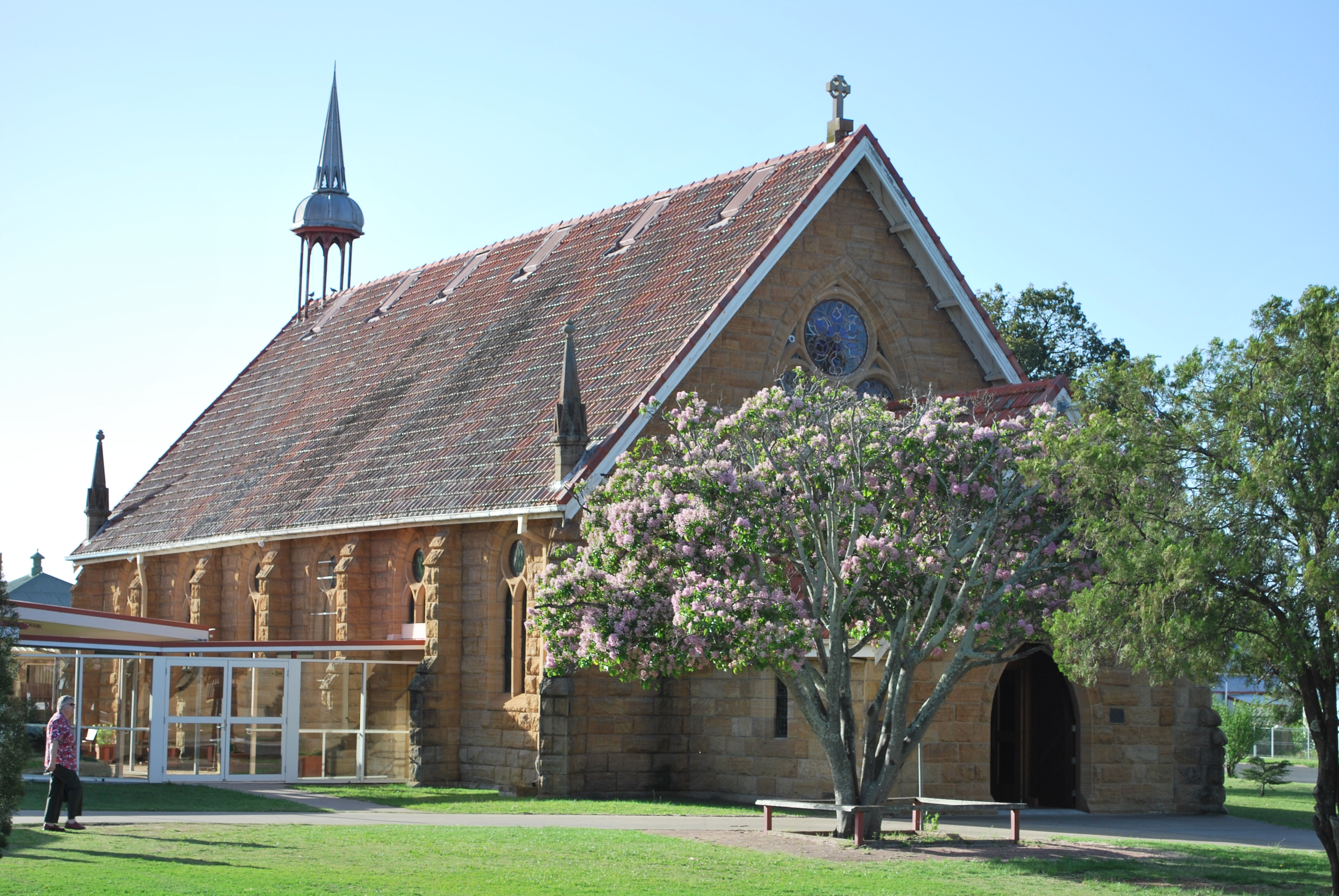
- Warwick Uniting Church, 2008
- Warwick Uniting Church
- 28°12′50″S 152°01′49″E
- Address: 37 Guy Street, Warwick, Southern Downs Region, Queensland
- Country: Australia
- Denomination: Uniting (since 1990)
- Previous denomination: Presbyterian (1869–1990)
- Website: wkuc.org.au

History
- Former name: St Andrew's Presbyterian Church
- Status: Church
- Dedication: Saint Andrew

Architecture
- Architectural type: Church
- Style: Gothic Revival
- Years built: 1869–1922
- Completed: 20 November 1870
- Construction cost: A£1,000

Specifications
- Materials: Sandstone

Administration
- Parish: Warwick Killarney

Queensland Heritage Register
- Official name: Warwick Uniting Church, St Andrew's Presbyterian Church
- Type: State heritage (landscape, built)
- Designated: 24 March 2000
- Reference no.: 601757
- Significant period: 1860s–1870s (historical) ongoing (social)
- Significant components: Trees/plantings, garden/grounds, church, stained glass window/s, views
- Builders: John McCulloch

Warwick Uniting Church is a heritage-listed Uniting church at 37 Guy Street (corner of Fitzroy Street), Warwick, Southern Downs Region, Queensland, Australia. It was built from 1869 to 1922. It is also known as St Andrew's Presbyterian Church. It was added to the Queensland Heritage Register on 24 March 2000.

Prior to the church's affiliation with the Uniting Church, the building was a place of worship for members of the Presbyterian Church of Australia.

== History ==
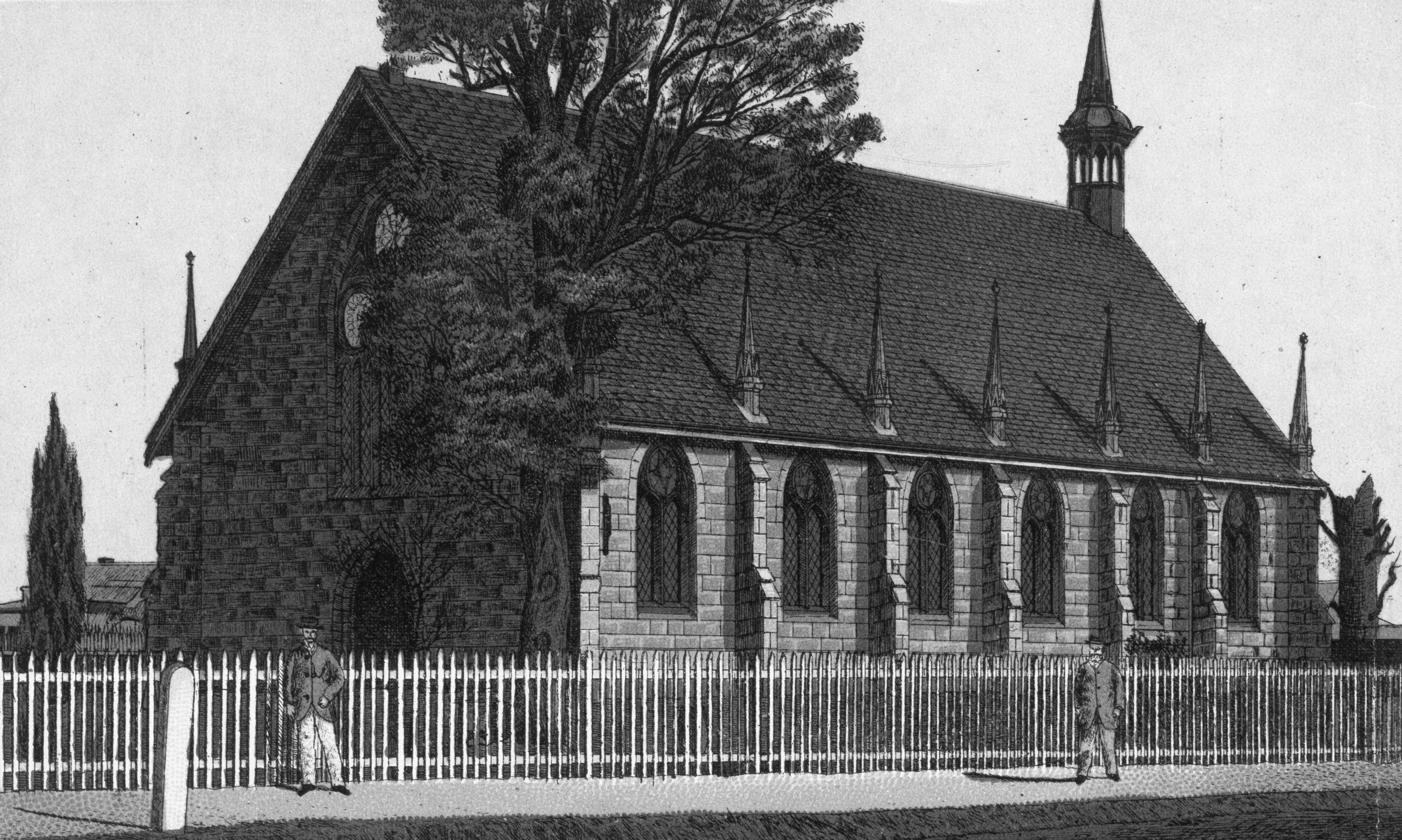
St Andrews Presbyterian Church, Warwick, circa 1885

Warwick Uniting Church is an unpretentious sandstone building built 1869–1870 and located on the corner of Fitzroy and Guy Streets, Warwick. The site also contains a parish hall (1998) and a manse (1940).

The sandstone church is the second church on this site which is associated with the earliest Presbyterian ministry on the Darling Downs. From the 1840s, an itinerant Presbyterian minister was present on the Darling Downs, however, it was not until Reverend Thomas Kingsford arrived in Warwick in 1851 that the church had a permanent presence in the district. The first services were held in the court house, initially in the timber slab building in Alice Street and then in the new Court House in Albion Street.

In May 1857 (prior to the Separation of Queensland), the New South Wales Government granted land in Alice Street to the church to build a church, school and manse. It may be that the land was unsuitable in some way as that same year the church purchased an alternate site on the corner of Fitzroy and Guy Streets for the sum of £36. A sawn slab and shingle church was constructed on the site in 1858, becoming the second provincial Presbyterian church to be established in Queensland, the first being in Ipswich.

The congregation in Warwick continued to expand and in 1867 a building committee was formed, making the decision to build a finer and larger church. The old church was sold to Harry Houghton for removal and continued to be used as a residence. Construction of a new church began in March 1869. It was built of local sandstone quarried near Rosehill and had a shingled roof. The contractor for the building was John McCulloch, foremost stonemason in the town and brother of the then Minister of the church, Reverend Colin McCulloch.

Deposits of continental sandstone in the district surrounding Warwick provided a ready source of good quality building stone for the town. As Warwick developed and early buildings were replaced, this sandstone was used for a number of the city's finest buildings and has become a distinguishing feature of the place. John McCulloch was the most prominent of Warwick's masons. He had learned his trade in Scotland and arrived in Warwick in 1863. It is difficult to assess the full extent of McCulloch's work in Warwick due to inadequate records from his yard; however, he is known to be responsible for a number of churches and commercial buildings, as well as the Court House, Town Hall, Sisters of Mercy Convent and the Railways Good Shed.

The church opened on Sunday 20 November 1870 and the first service was conducted by the Reverend Isaac Mackay, a noted Scottish preacher who held services in both English and Gaelic. The church was not quite complete and had cost £1000. St. Andrew's is said to have been the first church building in the colony that was floored in "cement". The local newspaper, the Warwick Examiner and Times reported on 26 November 1870 that the material was not only cheaper than timber but well suited to the Queensland climate as it was "cool, clean and almost noiseless when walked over" and commented that the building was "one of the best ornaments the town possesses".

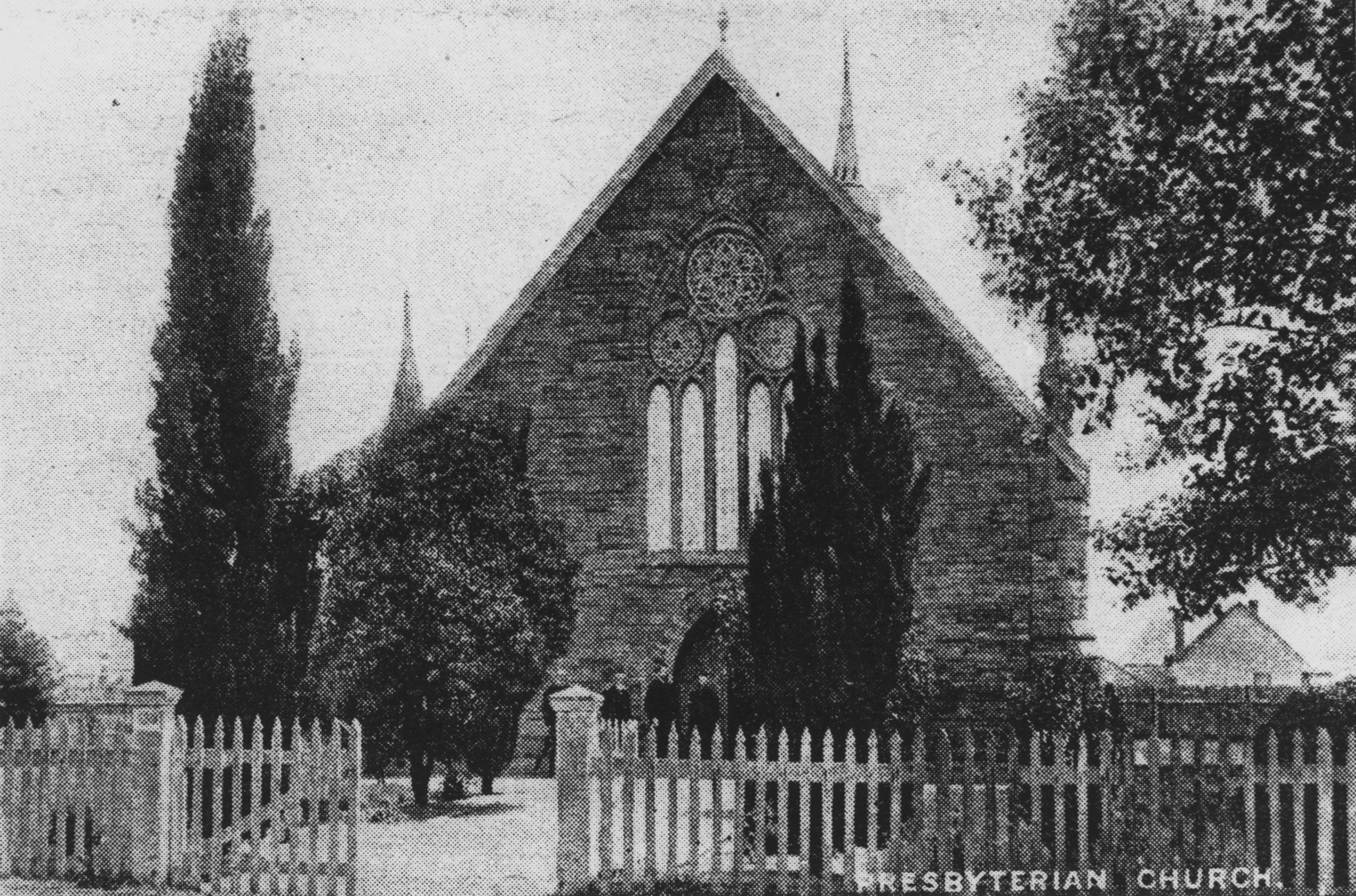
St. Andrews Presbyterian Church Warwick, circa 1894

A number of changes have taken place to the building over time. During the time that Reverend Robert Fraser was Minister (1882–87) he made an interest-free loan of £300 to the Committee of Management which was used to strengthen the roof and erect pinnacles on top of the buttresses. In 1897 a stone entry porch was added to the front of the building. This work is attributed to local builders, architects and surveyors, Wallace and Gibson, however, it is not clear whether they designed the porch as well as constructing it.

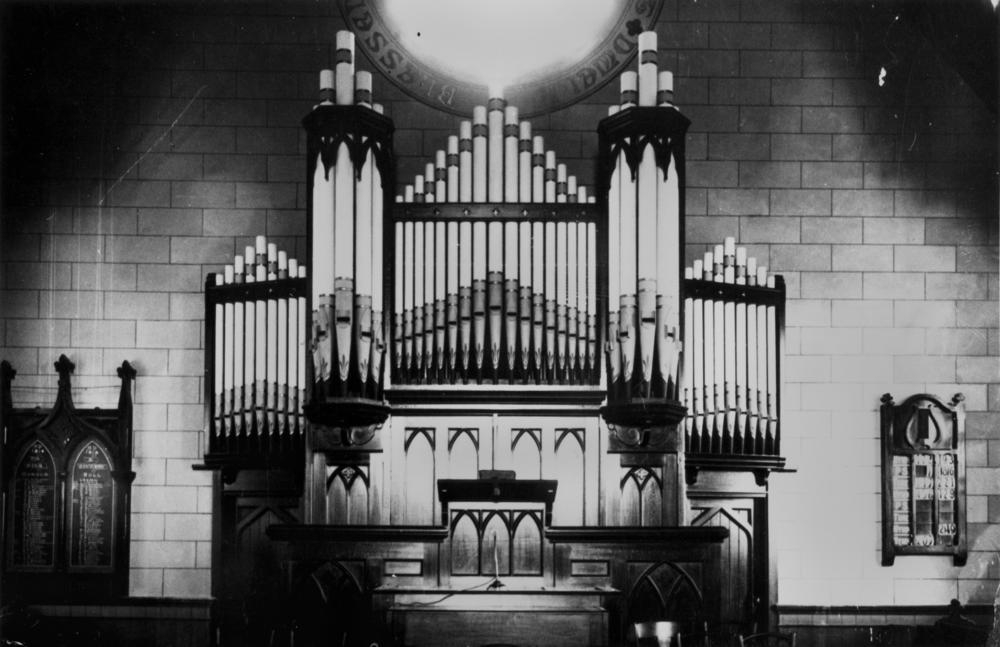
Pipe organ in St Andrews Presbyterian Church, Warwick

Fundraising for a hall began in 1900 and the Mary Williams Memorial Hall opened in 1904, incorporating an earlier hall that was re-aligned on the site. In 1922, a vestry and choir room were added to the eastern end of the church and a pipe organ was purchased as a Soldier's Memorial in 1924. A new manse, designed by R.H and H Campbell, was officially opened in 1940. It appears that the entry porch was re-modelled in 1950 through a financial gift of Charles and Esther Counsell and it is likely that the main roof was tiled and the pinnacles atop the buttresses were removed at this time. Major interior changes took place in 1964–65 following a gift from the Ross family. The pipe organ was extensively altered and the pipes were relocated into an alcove at the front of the church, the interior was re-lined including the fitting of acoustic tiles in the ceiling, installation of new pews and choir seating and the removal of traditional seating for elders.

In 1990, the Uniting Church congregations of Wesley and St. Andrew's joined together as one worshipping congregation and chose St. Andrew's church as their home, the church then became known as the Warwick Uniting Church. The Williams Memorial Hall was sold for removal in 1998 and a new hall designed by John Marsson and Associates Architects and also named the Williams Hall was dedicated in August 1999. A steel and glass link to the church was constructed at the same time and a window was removed to accommodate a new door to the church on the southern side. The manse is now used as office space.

== Description ==
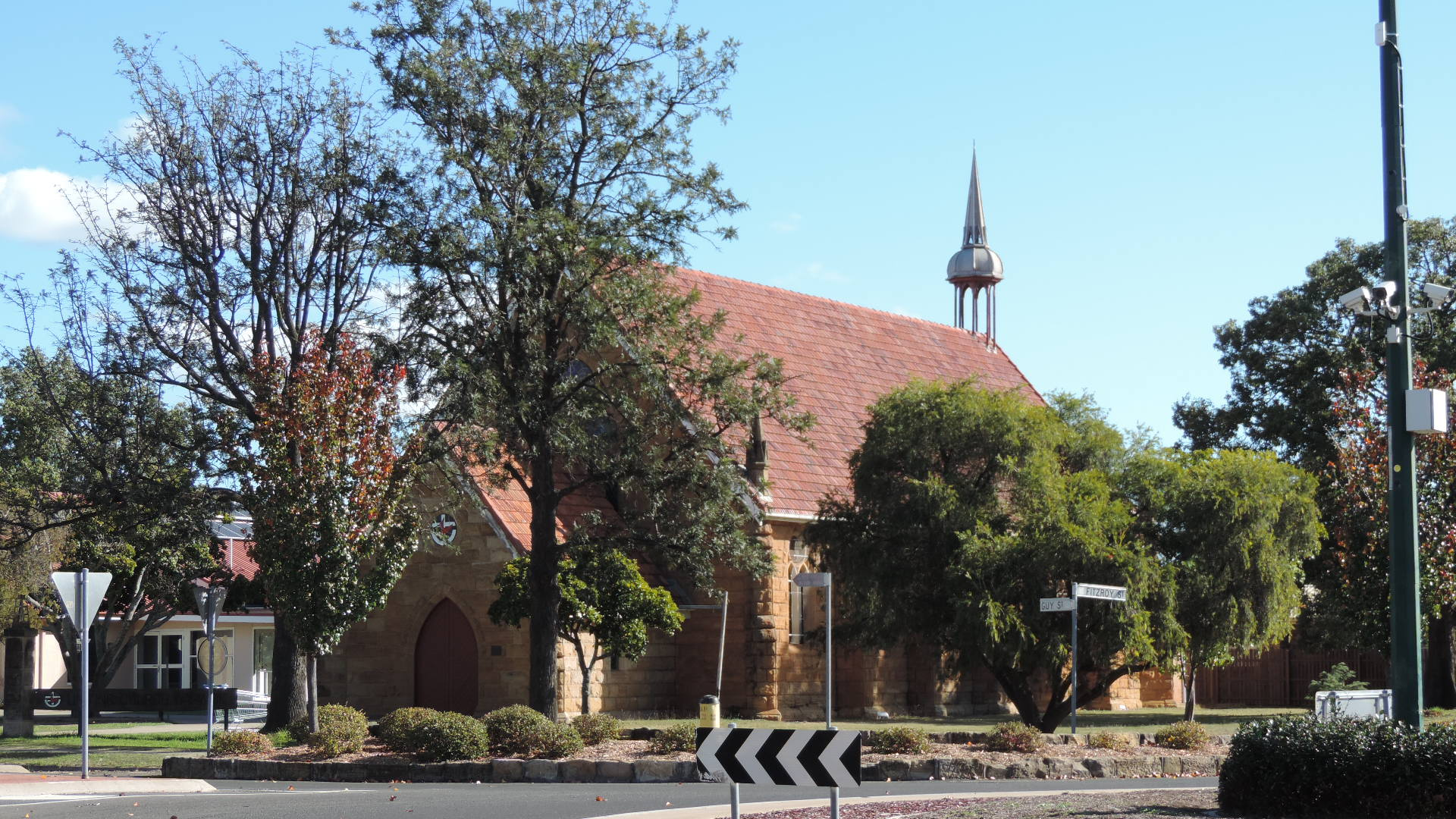
Warwick Uniting Church as seen from intersection of Guy and Fitzroy Streets, 2015

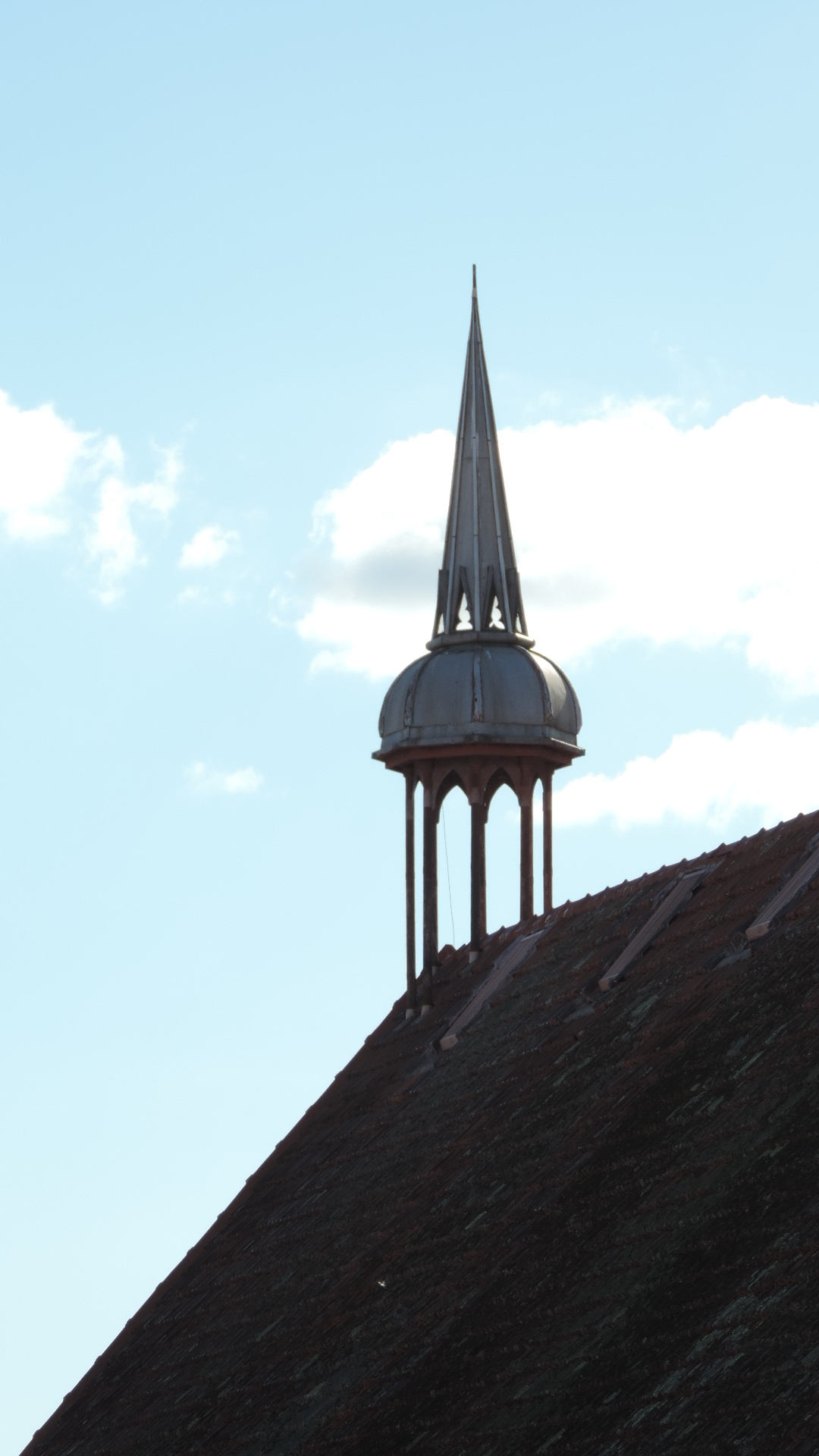
Close-up of flèche (mini spire), 2015

The Warwick Uniting Church is a simple sandstone structure, rectilinear in form, with a stone entry porch on the front eastern facade of the building. It is constructed of load-bearing, rock-faced ashlar sandstone and is divided into six bays separated with buttresses. Lancet arched openings, each housing a pair of lancet windows with a circular window above, are situated between each buttress. The majority of these windows are now filled with commemorative stained glass and the remainder with diamond patterned leadlight windows. A larger lancet arched opening at the eastern end contains three rose windows and five lancet windows, now partially obscured on the exterior by the entry porch. The western gable end contains a single rose window.

The entry porch is rock-faced ashlar with a pitched tiled roof and a pair of arched, timber entry doors surmounted by a small rose window. The steeply pitched roof of the church is clad in red terracotta tiles with small decorative stone pinnacles located in each corner and a small metal flèche resembling a miniature church spire at the roof ridge at the western end. The vestry and choir room is a small rendered masonry structure with a pitched roof added to the western end of the building. It is finished in pebbledash stucco and has a wide-pan corrugated iron roof which is painted.

The interior of the church has an open roof structure consisting of arched brace trusses with the ceiling lined in painted, diagonal timber boarding and acoustic tiles. The walls are lined in hardboard that has an ashlar-like profile and has a timber panelled dado. A pair of automatic, glass and timber framed doors separate the porch from the nave. The nave is carpeted, has a central aisle and recent timber pews. The choir and organ are located in the chancel, along with the pulpit, baptismal font, communion table, carved timber memorial chairs, war memorial boards and flags. The organ pipes are centrally located at the back of the chancel and are covered with a timber grille.

A window has been removed on the southern elevation and has been replaced with a recent door opening to a covered walkway that links the church to the new hall. A courtyard paved in terracotta tiles occupies the area between the church and hall. Lawn comprise the eastern and northern parts of the site, with a wide concrete path leading to the entry door of the porch flanked by mature trees including two large Silky Oaks and some smaller conifers.

== Heritage listing ==
Warwick Uniting Church was listed on the Queensland Heritage Register on 24 March 2000 having satisfied the following criteria.

The place is important in demonstrating the evolution or pattern of Queensland's history.

Warwick Uniting Church is important in demonstrating the early presence and growth of the Presbyterian church in the Darling Downs and the pattern of development of religious and social institutions of the city of Warwick.

The place is important because of its aesthetic significance.

As an early sandstone church in a city which owes much of its character to the use of local sandstone, Warwick Uniting Church has aesthetic value. The building makes a significant contribution to the streetscape, located on a prominent intersection of the town that includes Warwick Courthouse and Leslie Park.

The place has a strong or special association with a particular community or cultural group for social, cultural or spiritual reasons.

Warwick Uniting Church has social and spiritual significance for its association with the Presbyterian and Uniting Church congregation of Warwick as their principal place of worship for over 140 years.
