= Pringle Cottage Museum =

Coordinates: 28.2202°S 152.0269°E

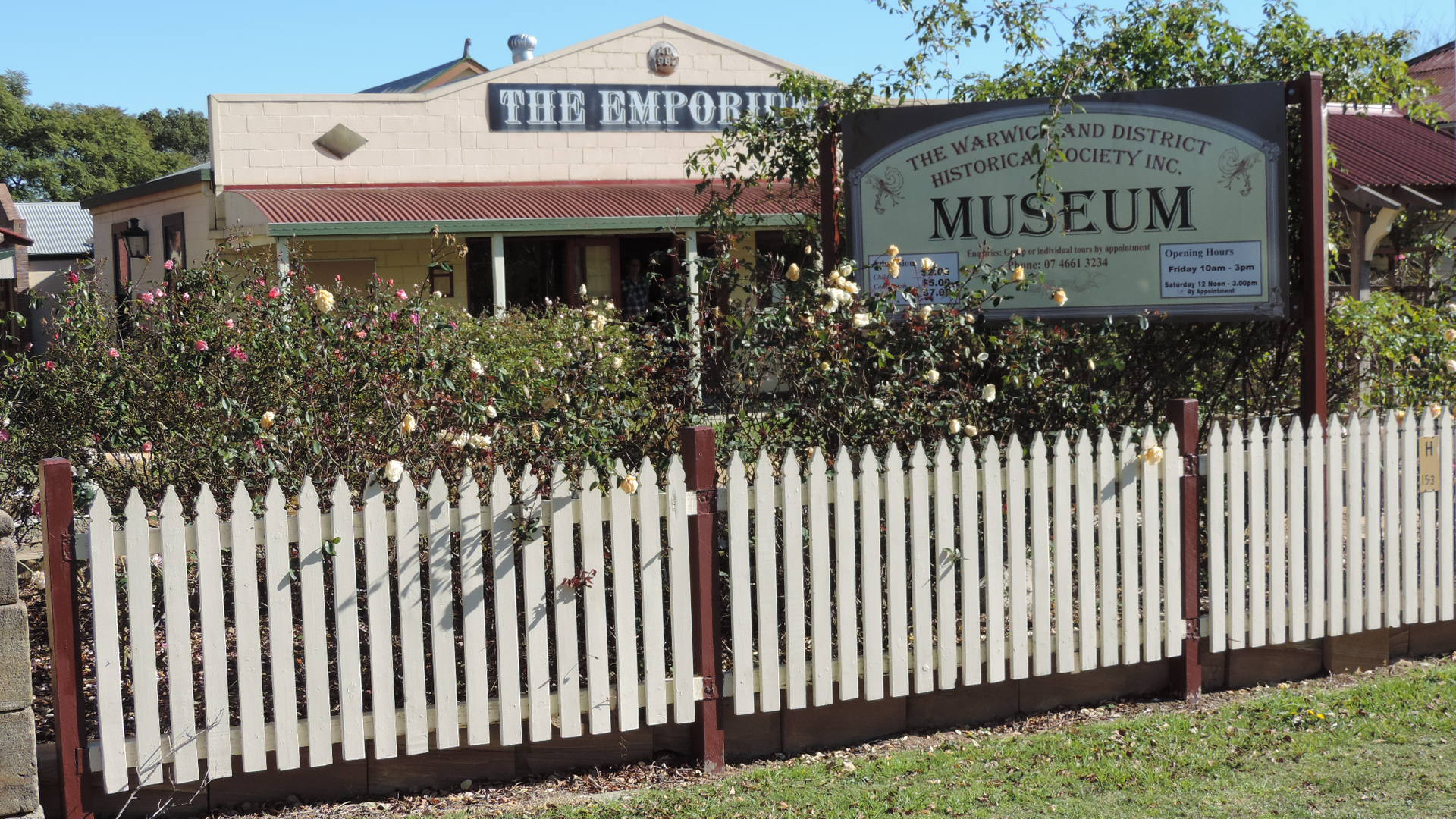
Pringle Cottage Museum, 2015

Pringle Cottage Museum is an open air museum at 79 Dragon Street, Warwick, Queensland, Australia. It is operated by the Warwick and District Historical Society.

== Buildings on site ==
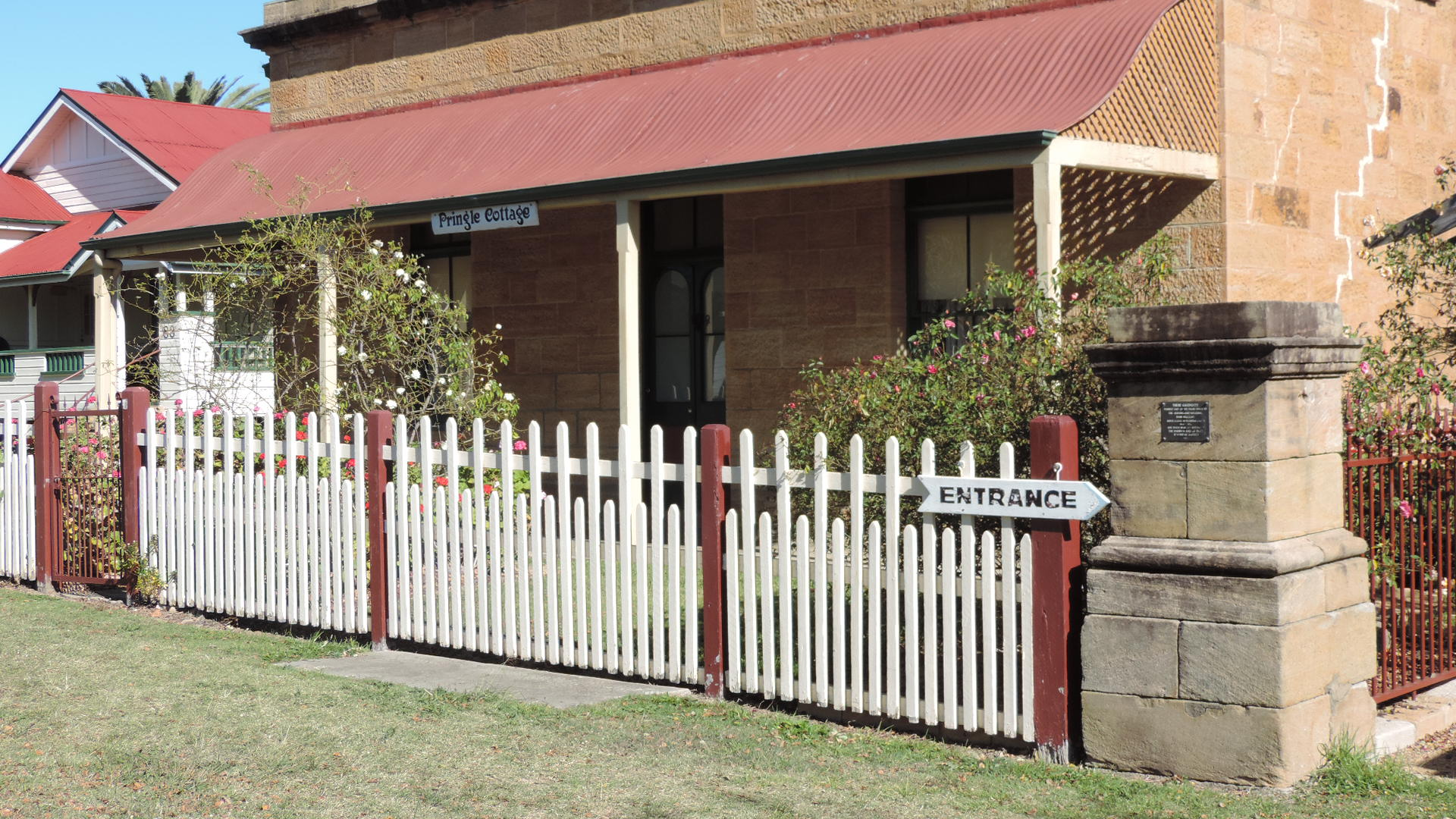
Pringle Cottage, 2015

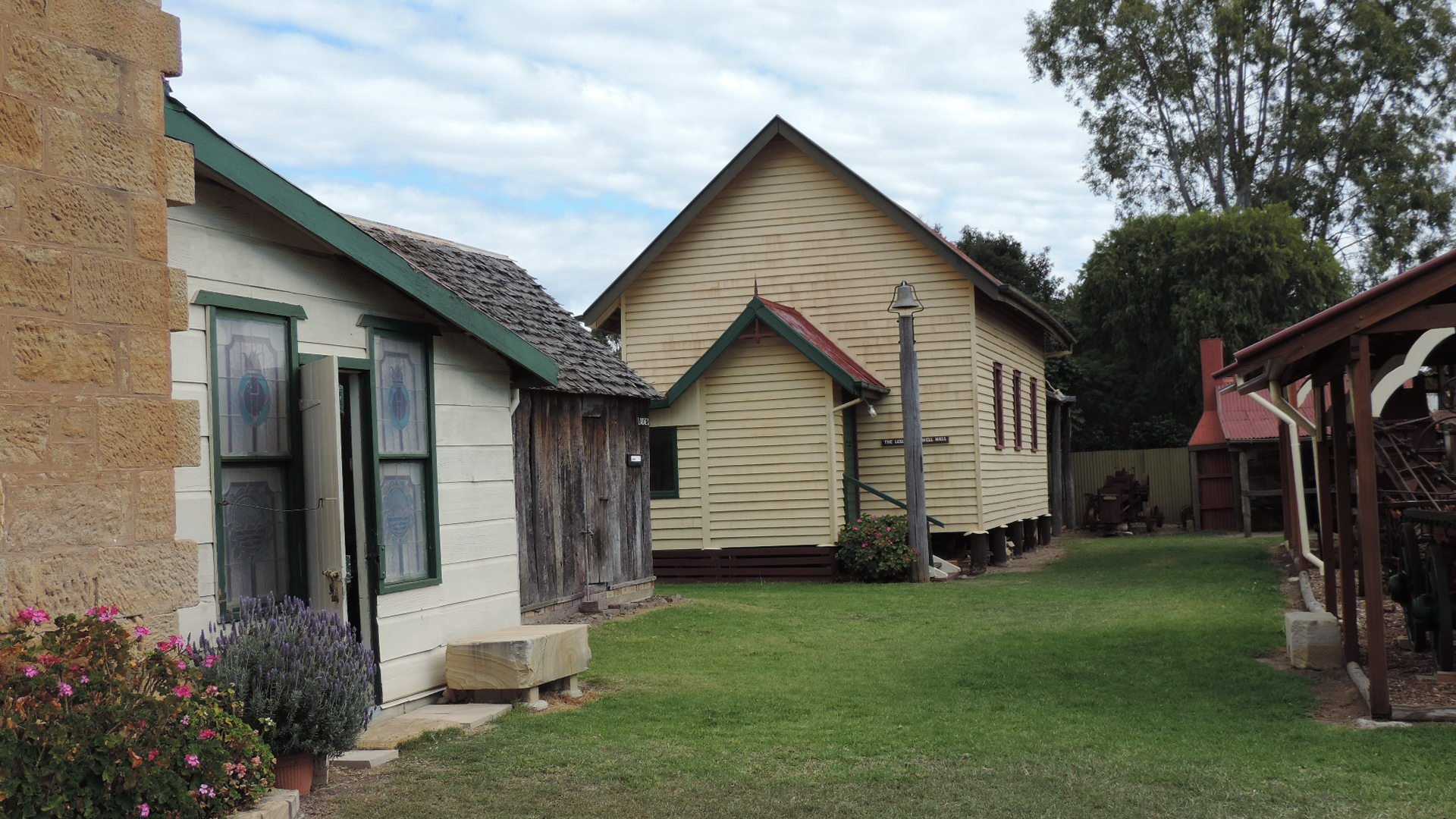
Willowvale Presbyterian church, 2015

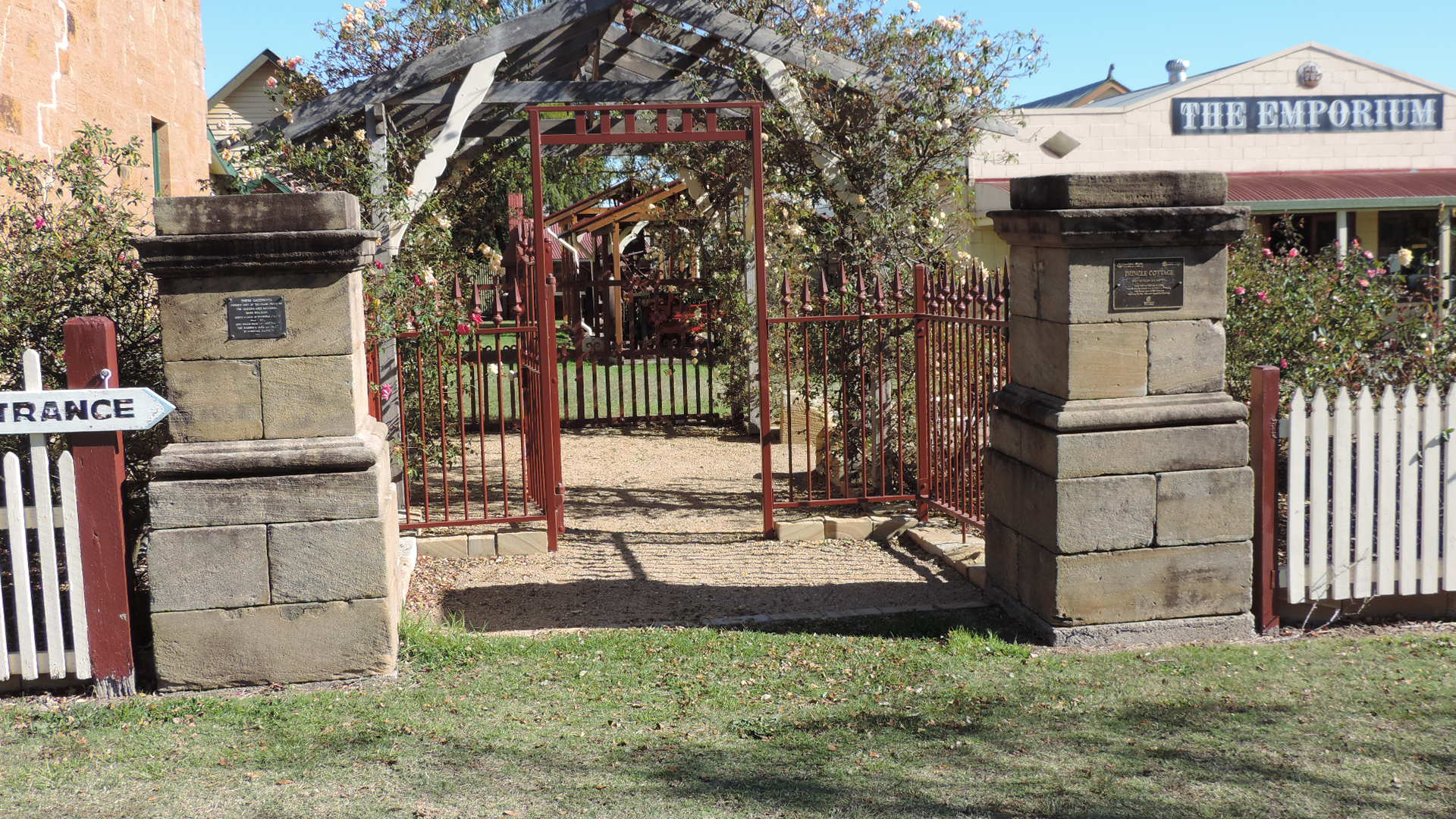
Entrance gates from the former Queensland National Bank, 2015

The nucleus of the museum is Pringle Cottage which is listed on the Queensland Heritage Register and remains on its original site. Other buildings have been relocated to the site to create the historical village. The village features buildings and artefacts that represent over a century of life in Warwick and surrounding districts.

The Willowvale Presbyterian Church was built by volunteer labour in 1909. It was relocated to Gillam Street in Glennie Heights in the 1950s and relocated to the historical village in 1972. It has been renamed Eastwell Hall after Leslie Burt Eastwell, a former president of the historical society and son of its founder.

The Overseers Cottage was originally on the Canning Downs pastoral station and is believed to be built before 1900. It was relocated to a number of sites in Warwick before being relocated to the historical village in 1974.

The entrance gates were originally from the Queensland National Bank building in Palmerin Street, Warwick.

The Warwick Daily News funded the development of the Print Museum building, which displays historical printing equipment.

The Emporium is a purpose-built display space built in 1982.
