= Warwick Central State School =

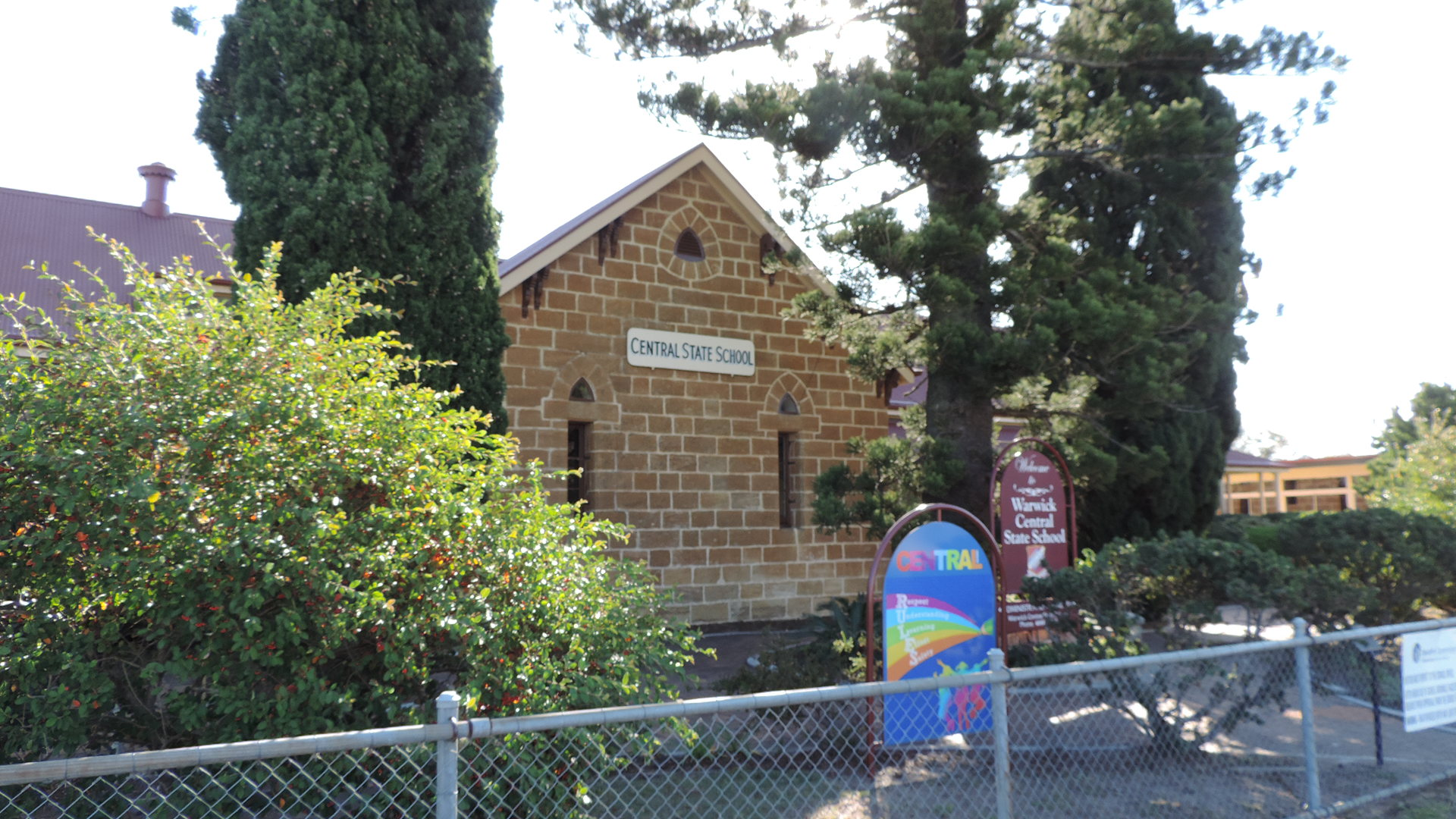
- Warwick Central State School, eastern elevation with lancet windows, 2015

- Location within Queensland Location within Australia
- 28.2175°S 152.0293°E
- Location: 55B Guy Street, Warwick, Southern Downs Region, Queensland, Australia

History
- Design period: 1870s–1890s (late 19th century)
- Built: 1874–1875

Queensland Heritage Register
- Official name: Warwick Central State School, Warwick West Boys School, Girls School and Infants School, Warwick West School
- Type: state heritage (built)
- Designated: 6 February 2006
- Reference no.: 602497
- Significant period: 1870s (historical); 1870s–1910s (fabric); 1875–ongoing (social)
- Significant components: school/school room, play shed

Warwick Central State School is a heritage-listed state school at 55B Guy Street, Warwick, Southern Downs Region, Queensland, Australia. It was built from 1874 to 1875. It is also known as Warwick West Boys School, Girls School and Infants School and Warwick West School. It was added to the Queensland Heritage Register on 6 February 2006.

== History ==
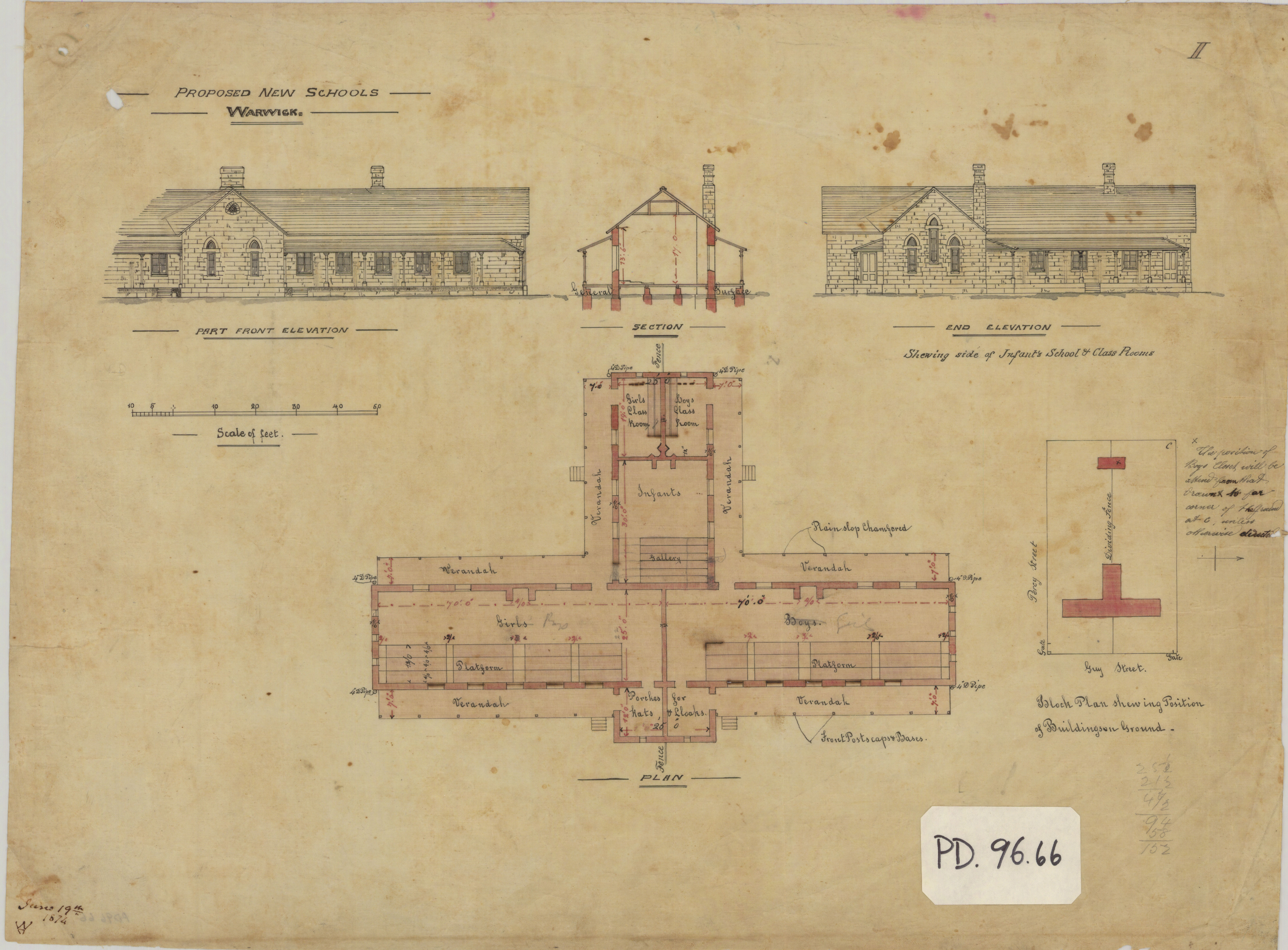
Architectural plans for the Warwick Central State School, 1874

The Central State School is a stone building constructed in 1875 as the second school in Warwick, but one of the earliest State-run schools in Queensland.

Education in Australia was first provided by Churches and by small private concerns. In 1848 a New South Wales Board of National Education was formed to provide public, secular education through National Schools. When Queensland separated from New South Wales in December 1859, two National Schools had been built in Queensland, the earliest in Warwick in 1850.

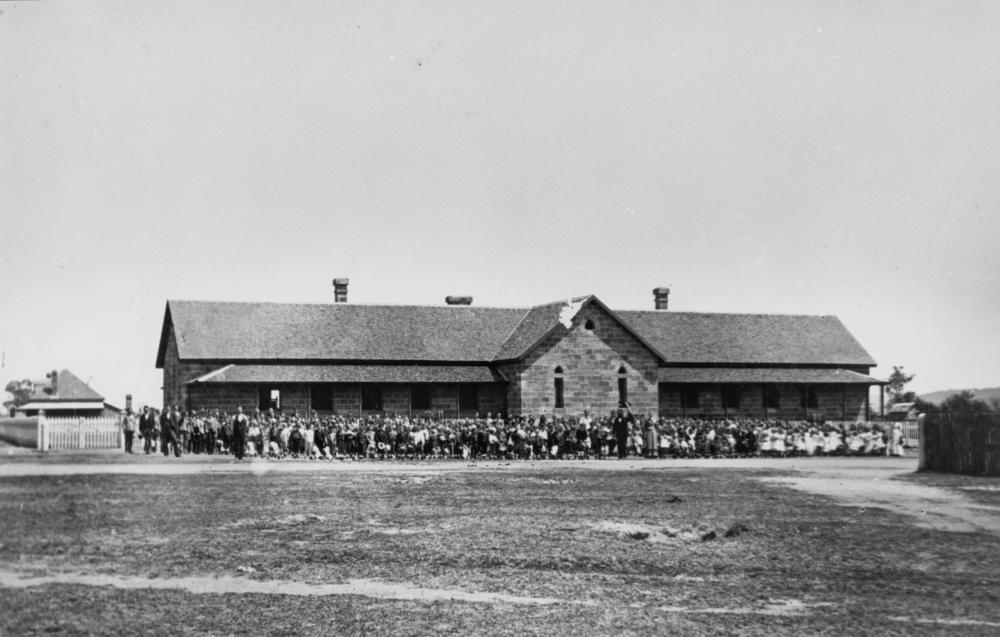
Warwick Central State School, circa 1875

The Education Act of 1860 was amongst the earliest legislation enacted by the new colony of Queensland. It established a Board of General Education and provided for a system of government-subsidised primary schools, similar to that in New South Wales. Under the Queensland Act, communities were required to contribute one-third of the cost of construction of new school buildings. Pupils at schools were also subject to payment of fees. At its commencement in 1860, the Board acquired four schools; 73 schools had been opened by 1868, and by 1874, 203 schools were open.

Many of the schools were conducted in buildings that were of primitive construction, the first Warwick school being constructed of timber slabs.

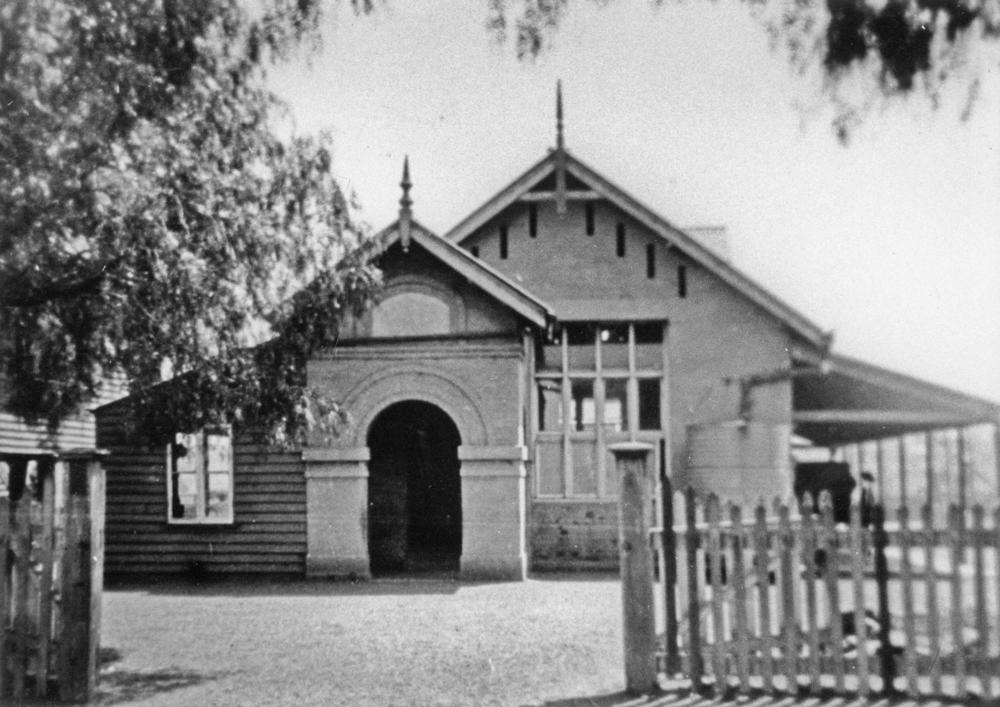
Warwick National School, later known as Warwick East State School, ca. 1928

Warwick was settled early and soon became an important regional centre. The Warwick National School quickly became overcrowded and, as development in Warwick spread westward, was no longer centrally located. In 1873 subscriptions were opened for a new school. In August, three lots of land on the corner of Guy and Percy Streets were purchased from George Clark of East Talgai for £150. The firm of Suter and Voysey submitted plans to the Board of Education on 20 September 1873 at a proposed cost of £1800.

Architect Benjamin Backhouse employed Richard George Suter in 1865. In 1864 Backhouse had prepared a model plan for the Queensland Board of Education, to be used for country schools. Whilst employed in Backhouse's office Suter prepared designs for school buildings, which later lead to the Board commissioning Suter for the design of timber schools and teacher's residences. From the end of 1868 until 1875, Suter undertook almost all of the Board's work, which involved approximately 30 National Schools. He described the plans for the school as being drawn up with "the strictest view to economy and consistency with the accommodation required." This accommodation provided for large classrooms with galleried seating where several classes would be taught at the same time under several teachers and pupil teachers.

The Mayor of Warwick, at a ceremony attended by 2000, people laid the foundation stone on 25 June 1874. The stonework was contracted to John McCulloch at a cost of £1055. John Keleher carried out the timber structures and joinery. The roof was originally shingled. It was completed by the end of March 1875 and was known as the Warwick Central School, the Warwick National School being renamed the Warwick East School. A dividing fence was constructed in the following year to separate the girls' and boys' sections.

Architect Richard Gailey, reporting to the Board of Education on 12 November 1875 criticised the design for its poor lighting and ventilation and commented on the ill fit of the windows. He recommended the construction of playground shelter sheds.

It was usual for parents to provide one fifth of the cost of such sheds and money was collected for them. They cost £140 each and were built by Keleher and completed by 5 February 1878.

In 1884 Johann Guntz bequeathed land adjoining the school and further land was added to the grounds in 1892 from the estate of Carl Brell.

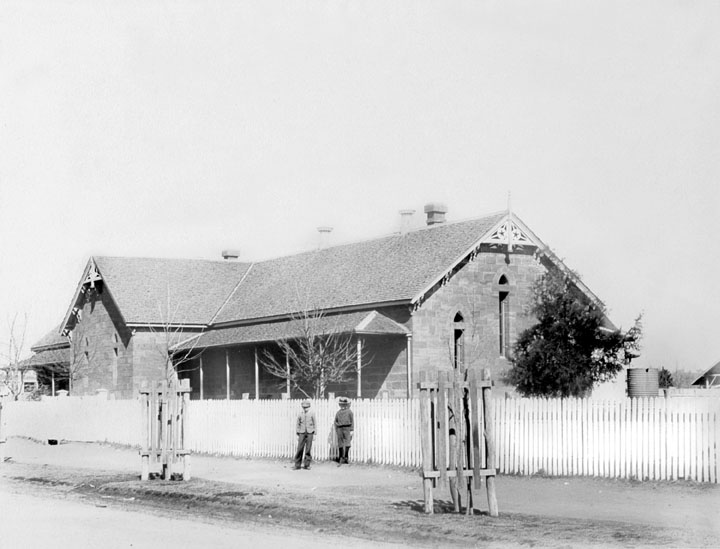
Warwick Central State School, circa 1890

The Warwick West School was divided by gender, the Girls and Infants School and the Boys School being conducted in identical wings of the school separated by walls and by a dividing fence down the centre of the school grounds. This division of the sexes remained in place until 1 January 1933 when the two schools where finally amalgamated to become the Warwick Central State School.

In 1909 both the main school building and toilet block required re- roofing. In 1910 a timber addition was made to the north of the main building. A report at the time also made mention of the poor lighting in the main building. In 1914 dormer windows in the main building were inserted.

In 1919 an open-air annexe was erected at a cost of £1167. While the annexe did relieve some of the over crowding its open nature was a cause of some concern with numerous reports to the Department of Education on it deficiencies as a classroom.

In 1929 Bert Mitchell planted a bunya pine seedling at the front of the building in honour of this son, Walter who attended the school as a 5 year old.

In 1939 the school and playsheds were reported to be in bad order and the Superintendent of Works from the Education Department recommended a new brick building replace the exiting main building, but this did not eventuate.

In 1956 and 1961 two new schools were built in Warwick and they relieved the overcrowding issue at Warwick Central State School.

In 1959 a new wing with six classrooms was constructed and two further classrooms were added in 1968–1969. When the new classrooms were built, the original school building was converted to convert to administrative use, a library and music rooms.

== Description ==
The former West Warwick School is set in well kept gardens with the main entrance facing Guy Street.

=== School Building ===
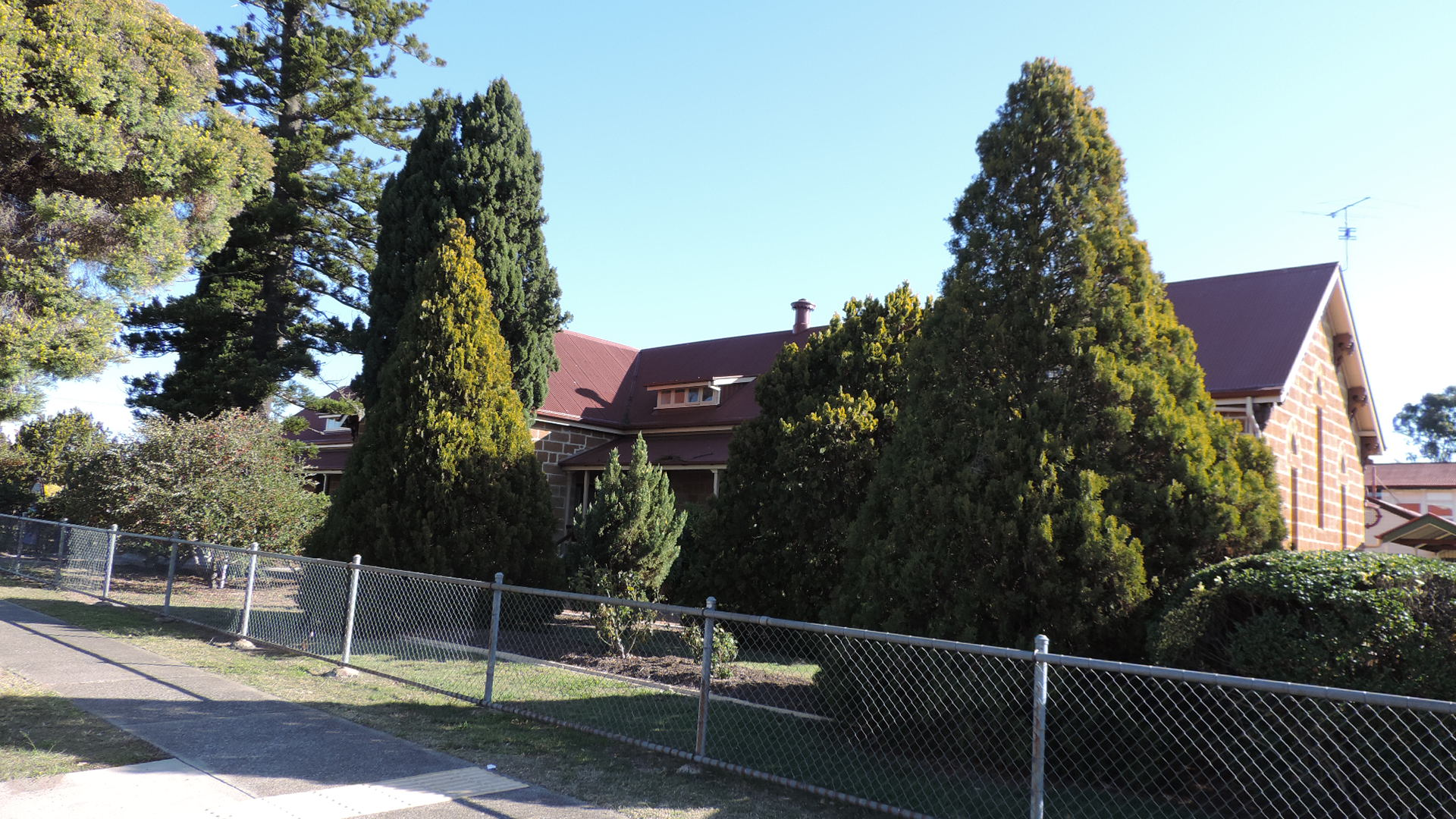
Warwick Central State School, 2015

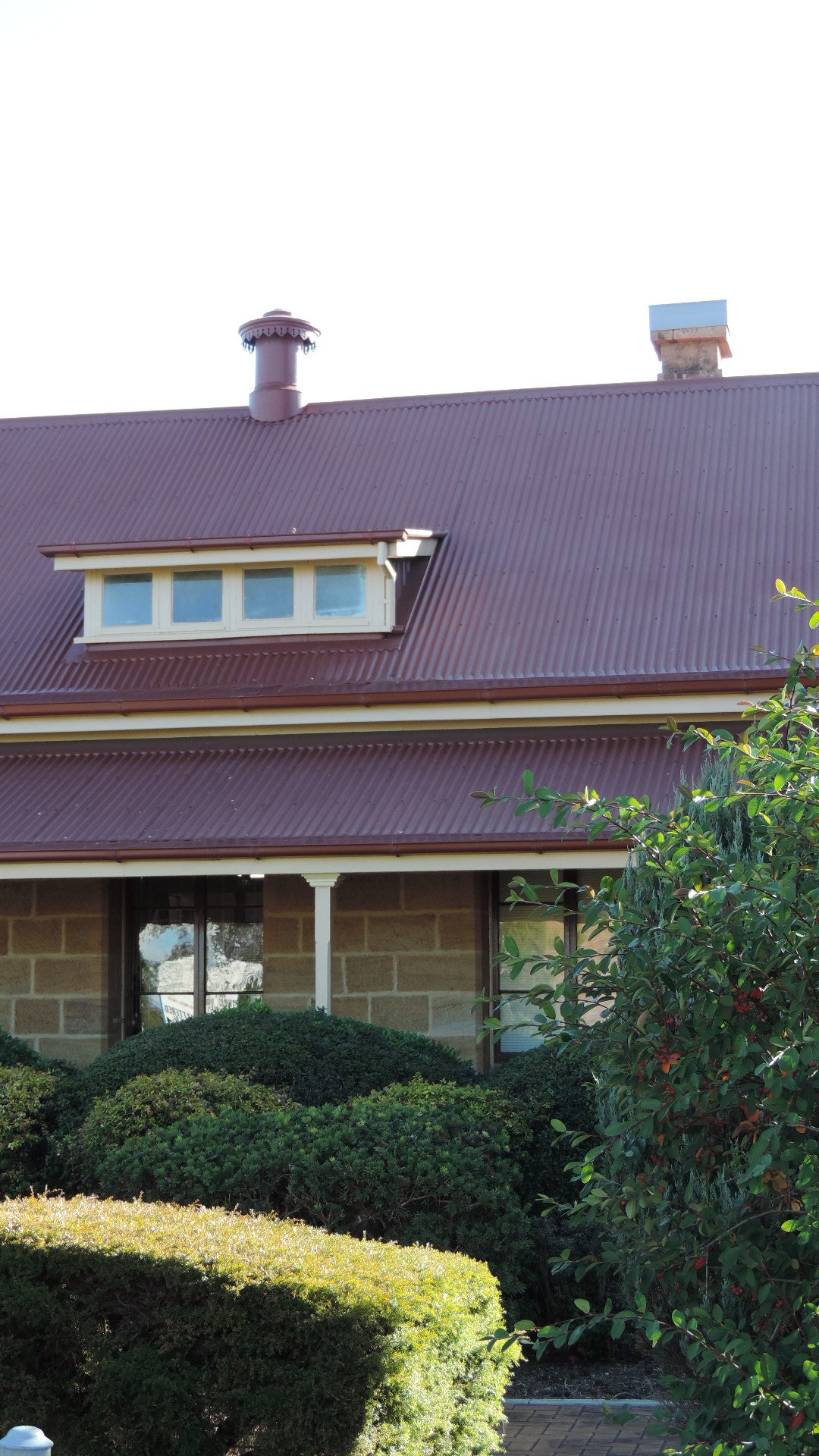
Sandstone blocks, corrugated iron roof, dormer windows and air vent, 2015

The original school is a single story building, T-shaped in plan and constructed from brown sandstone blocks. The gabled roof is clad in corrugated iron sheeting and is set with pairs of dormer windows on each side of the roof. Each dormer is composed of four single paned casements.

The eastern, principal, elevation features a projecting gable with two narrow lancet windows with a small arched window above them and a centrally positioned circular air vent. A similar arrangement of vent and lancet windows is found at the western gabled end of the building. On the northern and southern gable ends there are sets of three narrow lancet windows. Above each set is a small arched window. The eastern elevation has five large square windows to both northern and southern wings on either side of the projecting gabled entry porch. On both sides of each wing are open verandahs. The southwestern section is enclosed and incorporates a timber extension now used as a tuck shop.

Internally, the building is divided into four large rooms. At the front is the gabled entry to the southern wing currently used for school administration. The northern wing houses the library and the western wing is divided into two rooms currently used for music and storage rooms.

The administration wing is lined with fibrous cemented sheeting and contains an office and staff room. The Library is open planned and the rooms in the western wing retain the original spaces though the dividing walls have been removed, presumably when the single sex schools amalgamated.

The ceiling in the main building is lined with pressed metal. Modern stained glass windows have recently been inserted into the lancet windows on the northern wall of the library wing.

=== Playshed ===
One of the original playground shelter shed remains on the southern side of the grounds. It is timber framed with a gabled roof clad in corrugated iron. Walls to the lower half screen the rear and end walls. A section has been enclosed at the western end and is used for storage.

== Heritage listing ==
Warwick Central State School was listed on the Queensland Heritage Register on 6 February 2006 having satisfied the following criteria.

The place is important in demonstrating the evolution or pattern of Queensland's history.

As a substantial and early government primary school, the former Warwick West School demonstrates the development of the education system in Queensland. The building was constructed in 1874–75, a period of expansion for educational facilities in Queensland. It is an early example of a masonry school building designed by prominent architect RG Suter who was responsible for the design of many school buildings in Queensland from the late 1860s to the mid-1870s.

The place demonstrates rare, uncommon or endangered aspects of Queensland's cultural heritage.

The school is uncommon as an early and substantially intact school building and as one constructed of local stone, rather than brick or the timber later in common use.

The place is important in demonstrating the principal characteristics of a particular class of cultural places.

The building demonstrates the principal characteristics of early schools such as the provision of large classrooms for teaching by the Lancastrian system and in its gender division, separating class and play areas for girls and boys.

The place is important because of its aesthetic significance.

The Warwick Central State School has aesthetic value as an early example of Gothic revival school architecture and as a prominently sited building, pleasing in form and material, makes an important contribution to the character of Guy Street.

The place has a strong or special association with a particular community or cultural group for social, cultural or spiritual reasons.

The Warwick Central State School has provided primary education to generations of Warwick children and continues to be valued in this role.

The place has a special association with the life or work of a particular person, group or organisation of importance in Queensland's history.

The Warwick Central State School is significant as an example of the work of influential architect Richard Suter, who made an important contribution to the design of schools in Queensland. It is the only stone State school building designed by him in Queensland.
