= Members of the Queensland Legislative Assembly, 1871–1873 =

This is a list of members of the Legislative Assembly of Queensland from 1871 to 1873, as elected at the 1871 colonial elections held between 8 July 1871 and 6 September 1871 (due to problems of distance and communications, it was not possible to hold the elections on a single day).

| Name | Electorate | Term in office |
|---|---|---|
| Robert Travers Atkin^{[6]} | East Moreton | 1868–1869; 1870–1872 |
| Joshua Peter Bell | Northern Downs | 1862–1879 |
| John Bramston | Burnett | 1871–1873 |
| Archibald Berdmore Buchanan | Warrego | 1870; 1871–1873 |
| Charles Clark | Warwick | 1871–1873 |
| Benjamin Cribb | Town of Ipswich | 1861–1867; 1870–1873 |
| Oscar de Satge^{[7]} | Clermont | 1869–1870; 1870–1872; 1873–1877; 1881–1882 |
| George Edmondstone | Town of Brisbane | 1860–1867; 1869–1877 |
| John Ferrett | West Moreton | 1860–1863; 1870–1873 |
| Frederick Forbes | West Moreton | 1860–1863; 1865–1867; 1868–1873 |
| Alexander Fyfe | Rockhampton | 1870–1873 |
| Charles Graham^{[7]} | Clermont | 1872–1876 |
| Samuel Griffith^{[6]} | East Moreton | 1872–1893 |
| William Henry Groom | Drayton and Toowoomba | 1862–1901 |
| John Handy^{[4]} | Town of Brisbane | 1870–1871; 1872–1873 |
| William Hemmant ^{[2]} | East Moreton | 1871–1876 |
| John Johnston^{[8]} | Town of Ipswich | 1870–1872 |
| Henry Jordan | East Moreton ^{[2]} | 1860; 1868–1871; 1883–1890 |
| Henry Edward King^{[1]} | Wide Bay | 1870–1871; 1871–1873; 1874–1883 |
| Charles Lilley | Hamlet of Fortitude Valley | 1860–1873 |
| Arthur Macalister^{[8]} | Town of Ipswich | 1860–1871; 1872–1876 |
| Edward MacDevitt | Kennedy | 1870–1874 |
| William Miles | Maranoa | 1864–1873; 1874–1875; 1876–1887 |
| Boyd Dunlop Morehead | Mitchell | 1871–1880; 1883–1896 |
| Berkeley Basil Moreton^{[3]} | Burnett | 1870–1871; 1873–1875; 1883–1888 |
| Kevin O'Doherty | Town of Brisbane | 1867–1873 |
| Hon Arthur Hunter Palmer | Port Curtis | 1866–1881 |
| Ratcliffe Pring^{[4]} | Town of Brisbane | 1860–1862; 1863–1866; 1867–1872; 1873–1874; 1878–1879 |
| Hon Robert Ramsay | Western Downs | 1867–1873 |
| Charles Royds^{[5]} | Leichhardt | 1860–1864; 1868–1872 |
| Edmund Royds^{[5]} | Leichhardt | 1864–1868; 1872–1875 |
| John Scott | Leichhardt | 1868, 1870–1888 |
| Walter Jervoise Scott^{[3]} | Burnett | 1871–1878 |
| Thomas Blacket Stephens | Town of South Brisbane | 1863–1875 |
| John Malbon Thompson | Town of Ipswich | 1868–1881 |
| George Thorn | West Moreton | 1867–1874; 1876–1878; 1879–1883; 1887–1888; 1893–1902 |
| Edmond Thornton | Eastern Downs | 1868–1870; 1871–1873 |
| Horace Tozer^{[1]} | Wide Bay | 1871; 1888–1898 |
| William Henry Walsh | Maryborough | 1865–1878 |
| Edward Wienholt | Western Downs | 1870–1875 |

== See also ==
- Premier:

Arthur Hunter Palmer (1870–1874)

== Notes ==
^{1} On 29 September 1871, Horace Tozer, member of Wide Bay, resigned to enable for previous member for Wide Bay Henry Edward King (who failed to win Maryborough in the 1871 election) to be re-elected in Wide Bay. On 4 October 1871 King was elected unopposed in the by-election in Wide Bay.
^{2} On 20 October 1871, Henry Jordan, member for East Moreton, resigned. William Hemmant won the resulting by-election on 4 November 1871.
^{3} On 24 October 1871, Berkeley Basil Moreton, member for Burnett, resigned. Walter Jervoise Scott won the resulting by-election on 7 November 1871.
^{4} On 11 January 1872, Ratcliffe Pring, member for Town of Brisbane, resigned. John Handy won the resulting by-election on 27 January 1872.
^{5} On 30 January 1872, Charles Royds, the member for Leichhardt, resigned. His brother Edmund Royds won the resulting by-election on 20 February 1872.
^{6} On 7 March 1872, Robert Travers Atkin, member for East Moreton, resigned due to ill health (he died two months later). Samuel Griffith won the resulting by-election on 3 April 1872.
^{7} On 9 April 1872, Oscar de Satge, the member for Clermont, resigned. Charles Graham won the resulting by-election on 30 April 1872.
^{8} On 9 October 1872, John Johnston, the member for Ipswich, died. Arthur Macalister won the resulting by-election on 22 October 1872.
