= Members of the Queensland Legislative Assembly, 1867–1868 =

This is a list of members of the 3rd Legislative Assembly of Queensland from 1867 to 1868, as elected at the 1867 colonial elections held between 18 June 1867 and 19 July 1867 (due to problems of distance and communications, it was not possible to hold the elections on a single day).

Name	Electorate	Term in office
Archibald Archer^{[1]}	Rockhampton	1867–1869; 1878–1886; 1888–1896
Joshua Peter Bell	West Moreton	1862–1879
Henry Challinor	Town of Ipswich	1861–1868
George Clark	Warwick	1867–1868
John Douglas	Eastern Downs	1863–1866; 1867–1868; 1875–1880
Gilbert Eliott	Wide Bay	1860–1870
Thomas Henry FitzGerald^{[1]}	Rockhampton; Kennedy	1867–1869; 1873–1875
Charles Fitzsimmons^{[2]}	Clermont	1860–1861, 1865–1868
Arthur Francis	East Moreton	1867–1870
James Garrick	East Moreton	1867–1868; 1877–1883
William Henry Groom	Drayton and Toowoomba	1862–1901
Edward Lamb	Mitchell	1867–1869
Charles Lilley	Hamlet of Fortitude Valley	1860–1873
Arthur Macalister	Town of Ipswich	1860–1871; 1872–1876
Robert Mackenzie	Burnett	1860–1869
William Miles	Maranoa	1864–1873; 1874–1875; 1876–1887
John Murphy	Town of Ipswich	1867–1870
Graham Mylne	Warrego	1867–1868
Kevin O'Doherty	Town of Brisbane	1867–1873
Patrick O'Sullivan	West Moreton	1860–1863; 1867–1868; 1876–1883; 1888–1893
Hon Arthur Hunter Palmer	Port Curtis	1866–1881
Ratcliffe Pring	Burnett	1860–1862; 1863–1866; 1867–1872; 1873–1874; 1878–1879
Alexander Pritchard	Town of Brisbane	1867–1868
Theophilus Parsons Pugh	Town of Brisbane	1863–1869
Robert Ramsay	Western Downs	1867–1873
Charles Royds^{[3]}	Leichhardt	1860–1864; 1868–1872
Edmund Royds^{[3]}	Leichhardt	1864–1868; 1872–1875
Gordon Sandeman	Leichhardt	1863–1870
John Scott^{[2]}	Clermont	1868, 1870–1888
Thomas Blacket Stephens	Town of South Brisbane	1863–1875
James Taylor	Western Downs	1860–1870
George Thorn	West Moreton	1867–1874; 1876–1878; 1879–1883; 1887–1888; 1893–1902
Henry Thorn	Northern Downs	1867–1868; 1873–1876
William Henry Walsh	Maryborough	1865–1878

== See also ==
- Premier:

Robert Mackenzie (1867–1868)

== Notes ==
^{1} At the 1867 election, Thomas Henry FitzGerald stood as a candidate in two seats: Rockhampton (27 June) and Kennedy (19 July). Having won Rockhampton, he resigned Rockhampton on 30 June as he preferred to win Kennedy. Archibald Archer was returned unopposed in the subsequent by-election in Rockhampton on 27 July.
^{2} On 11 May 1868, Charles Fitzsimmons, the member for Clermont, resigned. John Scott won the resulting by-election on 22 June 1868.
^{3} On 11 May 1868, Edmund Royds, the member for Leichhardt, resigned. Edmund's brother, Charles Royds, won the resulting by-election on 29 June 1868.
