= Warry =

Warry is a surname. Notable people with the surname include:

- Fred Warry (1880–1959), Australian rules footballer
- Marty Warry (born 1977), Australian rules footballer
- Richard Warry (1829–1891), Australian politician
- Thomas Symes Warry (1819–1864), Australian politician
