= Thomas Symes Warry =

Australian politician

Thomas Warry

Member of the Queensland Legislative Assembly for East Moreton
- In office 27 October 1860 – 26 August 1863 Serving with George Edmondstone
- Preceded by: Henry Buckley
- Succeeded by: William Brookes

Personal details
- Born: Thomas Symes Warry; 1819 Birmingham, England
- Died: 19 August 1864 aged (44-45) Brisbane, Queensland, Australia
- Occupation: Chemist

Thomas Symes Warry (died 1864) was a pioneer chemist and politician in Queensland, Australia. He was a Member of the Queensland Legislative Assembly.

== Early life ==
Thomas Symes Warry was born about 1819 in England, the son of Thomas Warry and his wife Maria Symes. He was the brother of the Mayor of Brisbane, Richard Warry.

== Politics ==
On 29 September 1860, Henry Buckley, member for East Moreton, resigned. Thomas Warry was elected to the Queensland Legislative Assembly the resulting by-election on 27 October 1860.

Warry stood for re-election in East Moreton in the 1863 election and was elected. However errors by the returning officer resulted in the election for East Moreton not occurring on a single day with the poll in Cleveland being held at a later date. However, the results of the initial polling were made public before the poll in Cleveland, showing George Edmondstone and William Brookes in the lead with Warry coming third in this two-member electors. This allowed Warry supporters to canvass votes in Cleveland putting Warry into second place and hence elected. Given these irregularities in the conduct of the election, Brookes challenged the result and the election was declared void, terminating Warry's political tenure in East Moreton on 26 August 1863. A second election in East Moreton was held on 5 September 1863, which was won by George Edmondstone and William Brookes with Robert Cribb coming third and Warry fourth and last. Robert Cribb lodged an objection to the outcome of the second election saying that the ballot paper were printed in a manner likely to mislead the voters. A third election in East Moreton was called on 26 September 1863 and George Edmonstrone and Robert Cribb were elected with William Brookes in third place (Warry coming fifth and last).

On 8 April 1864, George Raff, member for Town of Brisbane, resigned. Thomas Warry contested the resulting by-election on 22 April 1864 but was unsuccessful with William Brookes being elected. Warry challenged the election result claiming that Brookes had conflicts of interest in relation to contracts with the Queensland Government. On 3 August 1864, the election was declared null and void. A second election was called on 13 August 1864, in which William Brookes won handsomely with Warry coming third and last.

== Later life ==
Warry became seriously ill on the Sunday after the Town of Brisbane election, and died five days later on Friday 19 August 1864 at his home at Spring Hill.

== See also ==
- Members of the Queensland Legislative Assembly, 1860–1863

Parliament of Queensland
Preceded by Henry Buckley	Member for East Moreton; 1860–1863; Served alongside: George Edmondstone	Succeeded by William Brookes
