= Electoral district of Wickham =

Electoral district of Wickham may refer to:

- Electoral district of Wickham (New South Wales)
- Electoral district of Wickham (Queensland)
