= Electoral district of Wickham (Queensland) =

Former state electoral district of Queensland, Australia

Wickham Queensland—Legislative Assembly
- State: Queensland
- Dates current: 1873–1878

Wickham was an electoral district of the Legislative Assembly in the Australian state of Queensland from 1873 to 1878.

Wickham was a single-member constituency which arose from the break-up of the three-member constituency of Town of Brisbane. It lasted for only one Parliament, as it was merged in 1878 with Brisbane City to create the two-member constituency of North Brisbane.

== Members for Wickham ==
Member	Party	Term
George Edmondstone	Unaligned	1873–1877
Albert John Hockings	Unaligned	1877–1878

== See also ==
- Electoral districts of Queensland
- Members of the Queensland Legislative Assembly by year
- Category:Members of the Queensland Legislative Assembly by name
