= William Brookes (Queensland politician) =

Australian politician

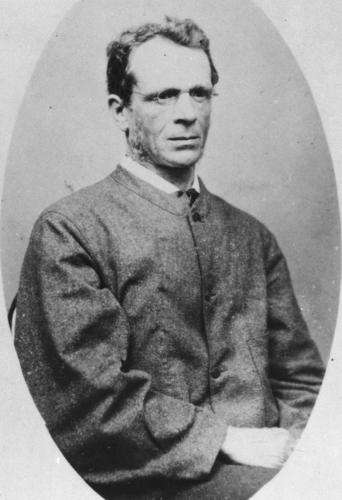

Member of the Queensland Legislative Assembly for East Moreton
- In office 22 April 1864 – 3 August 1864 Serving with George Edmondstone
- Preceded by: Thomas Warry
- Succeeded by: Robert Cribb

Member of the Queensland Legislative Assembly for Town of Brisbane
- In office 22 April 1864 – 3 August 1864 Serving with Charles Blakeney, George Raff, Theophilus Pugh
- Preceded by: George Raff
- Succeeded by: Himself
- In office 13 August 1864 – 2 June 1867 Serving with Charles Blakeney, George Raff, Theophilus Pugh
- Preceded by: Himself
- Succeeded by: Kevin O'Doherty

Member of the Queensland Legislative Assembly for North Brisbane
- In office 13 January 1882 – 5 May 1888 Serving with Samuel Griffith
- Preceded by: Arthur Palmer
- Succeeded by: Seat abolished

Member of the Queensland Legislative Council
- In office 27 June 1891 – 11 June 1897

Personal details
- Born: William Brookes; 14 October 1825 Hanging Ditch, Manchester, England
- Died: 16 July 1898 (aged 72) Eagle Junction, Queensland, Australia
- Resting place: South Brisbane Cemetery
- Spouse: Mary Ann Evans (m.1849 d.1890)
- Occupation: Ironmonger

William Brookes (14 October 1825 – 16 July 1898) was a member of both the Queensland Legislative Council and the Queensland Legislative Assembly in Australia.

== Early life ==
Brookes was born in Hanging Ditch, Manchester, to William Brookes and his wife, Mary (née Oakden) and was educated at Hall State School, Manchester, and was also privately schooled. He began his working career as an apprentice draper before arriving in Sydney in 1848 on the SS 'Bengal'. After trying his hand unsuccessfully as a gold miner at Turon, he returned to Sydney and joined the Union Bank of Australia as a clerk.

In 1853, Brookes was sent to Queensland to work with J.S. Turner in opening a branch of the Union Bank and five years later, in partnership with his brother Benjamin, purchased an Ironmonger's business in Brisbane.

== Political career ==
Brookes entered politics in 1858, serving as an alderman in the Brisbane Municipal Council till 1866. He was elected to the Queensland Legislative Assembly as the member for East Moreton in September 1863 but nine days later his election was declared null and void and in the resulting by-election he lost to Robert Cribb.

In 1864, Brookes stood for the seat of Town of Brisbane which he duly won however, once again his election was declared null and void. This time though, he won the by-election and held the seat till 1867 when he was defeated by Dr Kevin O'Doherty.

His final representation in the Assembly came when he won the seat of North Brisbane in 1882, holding it for six years until losing the seat in 1888.

Brookes was appointed to the Queensland Legislative Council in 1891, serving for six years until his retirement from politics in 1897.

=== Opposition to the Melanesian labour trade ===
As a liberal humanitarian he was an ardent opponent of the Melanesian labour trade. He stressed its worst features; that the labourers were treated like chattels, and that they were often obtained illegally or unwittingly. In the Select Committee on the General Question of Polynesian Labour 1876, Brookes stated "The idea of obtaining servants over whom we could have unlimited control; who would be obedient, docile, handy, industrious... for wages that are so small they seemed to be next to no wages at all... drove out all consideration of how these people were procured" and "so it came to pass that citizens,... saw no shame in availing themselves of the labor of poor helpless savages who have been inveigled from their native homes, or... who had been sold at their island by their chiefs, and bought by white men and bought a second time at our wharves in Brisbane, Maryborough, Rockhampton and Mackay" "They had a market price; were quoted at so much a head...They were, in fact, merchandise."

== Personal life ==
In Sydney in 1849, Brookes married Mary Ann Evans, whom he had met on the voyage to Australia and together they had five children. Brookes died in 1898 and was buried in South Brisbane Cemetery.

Parliament of Queensland
Preceded by Thomas Warry	Member for East Moreton; 1863; Served alongside: George Edmondstone	Succeeded by Robert Cribb
Preceded by George Raff	Member for Town of Brisbane; 1864; Served alongside: Charles Blakeney, George Raff, Theophilus Pugh	Succeeded by Himself
Preceded by Himself	Member for Town of Brisbane; 1864–1867; Served alongside: Charles Blakeney, George Raff, Theophilus Pugh	Succeeded by Kevin O'Doherty
Preceded by Arthur Palmer	Member for North Brisbane; 1882–1888; Served alongside: Samuel Griffith	Abolished
