= Albert John Hockings =

Australian politician

Albert Hockings
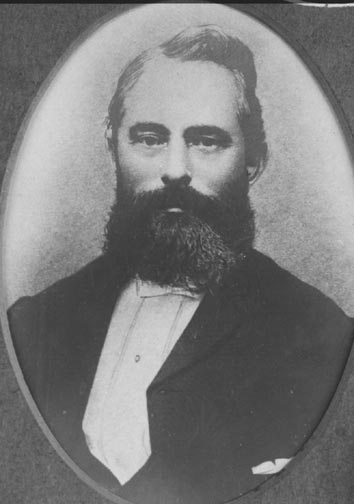

5th Mayor of Brisbane
- In office 1865–1865
- Preceded by: Joshua Jeays
- Succeeded by: Richard Warry
- In office 1867–1867
- Preceded by: Richard Warry
- Succeeded by: John Hardgrave

Member of the Queensland Legislative Assembly for Member for Wickham
- In office 12 May 1877 – 25 November 1878
- Preceded by: George Edmondstone
- Succeeded by: Seat abolished

Personal details
- Born: Albert John Hockings; 21 February 1826 London, England
- Died: 11 November 1890 (aged 64) South Brisbane, Queensland, Australia
- Resting place: South Brisbane Cemetery
- Spouse: Elizabeth Bailey
- Occupation: Merchant

Albert John Hockings (21 February 1826 – 11 November 1890) was a politician in Queensland, before the Federation of Australia. He was a Member of the Queensland Legislative Assembly and an alderman and mayor of the Brisbane Town Council.

== Personal life ==
Albert John Hockings was the son of Thomas Hockings (a carpenter) and Jane Thorton. He was baptised at St Martin-in-the-Fields, London, England on 16 April 1826.

In 1841 his parents Thomas and Jane Hockings immigrated to Australia on William Jardine accompanied by their sons Albert and Henry.

Albert John Hockings married Elizabeth Bailey (daughter of Samuel William Bailey and Elizabeth Scott) in Brisbane on 17 August 1851. Together they had a number of children:

- Albert Thomas (born 1852)
- Jane Elizabeth (born 1854)
- Emily Frances (born 1856)
- William Stanley Thornton (born 1857)
- August Charles Scott (1859–1863)
- Eva Alexandra Blance (born 1863)
- Florence Eleanor (1865–1866)
- Percy Frank (born 1867)
- Edwin Morton (born 1870), a prominent architect in Rockhampton

Albert John Hockings died in Brisbane on 11 Nov 1890. His wife Elizabeth died in Brisbane on 8 Sept 1907. They are buried together in South Brisbane Cemetery.

== Business life ==
Albert John Hockings was a seedsman (a dealer in seeds). He was an importer and merchant of seeds, plants and agricultural implements.

In 1845–46 he undertook a trading expedition on the brigantine Sarah Wilson to a number of South Pacific Islands, including Auckland (New Zealand), Tahiti, Samoa, and Tonga. In May 1861, he delivered a public lecture on the cruise at the Mechanics Institute, South Brisbane.

He published a number of books on gardening including:

- The flower garden in Queensland : containing concise and practical instructions on the cultivation of the flower garden, and the management of pot plants in Australia in 1875
- Queensland garden manual : containing concise directions for the cultivation of the garden, orchard, and farm in Queensland in 1875
- a revised edition of Queensland garden manual : containing concise directions for the cultivation of the garden orchard and farm in Queensland in 1888 with additional material entitled To which are added sericulture (silkworm), and the cultivation of sugar, coffee, tea, and numerous other tropical plants and fruit trees especially adopted to the climate and soil of Queensland

== Public life ==
Albert John Hockings was an alderman of the Brisbane Municipal Council in 1859–60 and 1864–67. He was mayor in 1865 and 1867.

He served on the following committees:

- Finance Committee 1860, 1865
- Legislative Committee 1864
- Incorporation Committee 1864
- Improvement Committee 1866, 1867
- Bridge Committee 1866, 1867

Hockings stood for election to the Queensland Legislative Assembly in the electoral district of Town of South Brisbane in the 1860 Queensland colonial election, but was defeated by his opponent Henry Richards by 72 votes to 18.

However, on 28 April 1877, George Edmondstone, member for Wickham, resigned. John Hockings won the resulting by-election on 12 May 1877. He held the seat until 25 November 1878 (the 1878 Queensland colonial election).

He was one of the original trustees of South Brisbane Cemetery.

== See also ==
- List of mayors and lord mayors of Brisbane
- Members of the Queensland Legislative Assembly, 1873–1878

Parliament of Queensland
Preceded by George Edmondstone	Member for Wickham; 1877–1878	Abolished
