= Electoral district of Brisbane City =

Former colonial electoral district of Queensland

Brisbane City Queensland—Legislative Assembly
- State: Queensland
- Created: 1873
- Abolished: 1878
- Namesake: Brisbane

Brisbane City was an electoral district of the Legislative Assembly in the Australian state of Queensland from 1873 to 1878.

Based in inner Brisbane, north of the Brisbane River, it was first created as a single member constituency for the 1873 colonial election, formed as a result of the abolition of the three member constituency Town of Brisbane. It was abolished at the 1878 colonial election and replaced by the new dual member constituency of North Brisbane.

== Members for Brisbane City ==
Member	Term
Robert Stewart	Nov. 1873 – Feb. 1878
Ratcliffe Pring	Feb. 1878 – Nov. 1878

== See also ==
- Electoral district of Brisbane (Queensland), which existed 1912 to 1977
- Electoral districts of Queensland
- Members of the Queensland Legislative Assembly by year
- Category:Members of the Queensland Legislative Assembly by name
