= John Hardgrave =

Australian politician

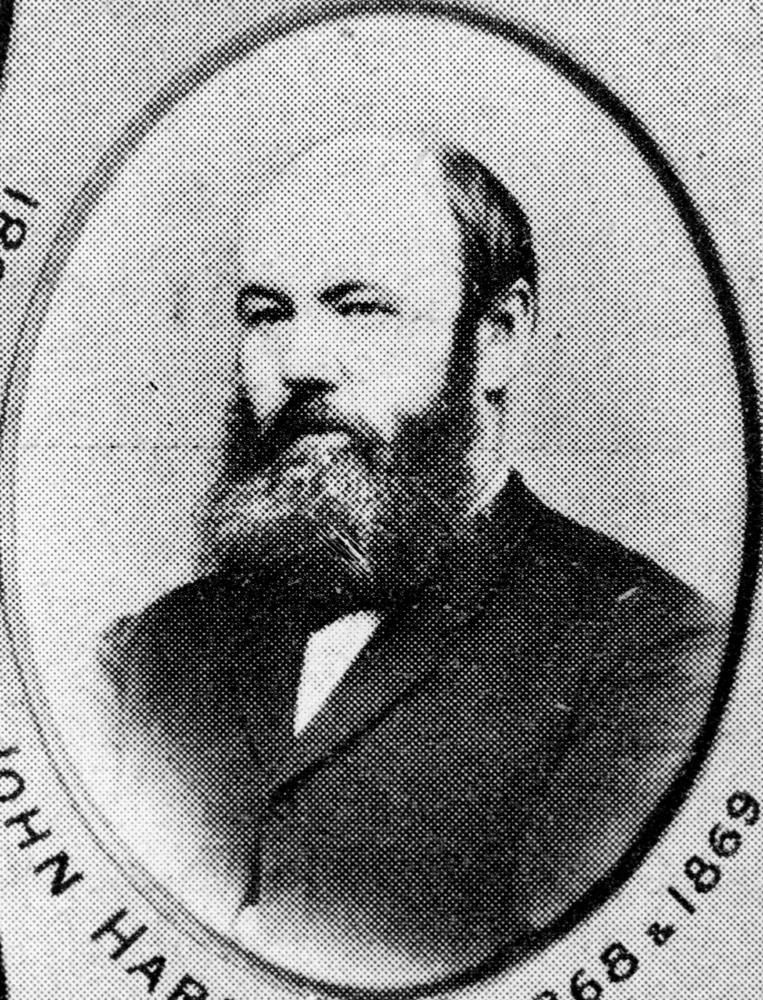
- John Hardgrave, ca. 1868-1869.

7th Mayor of Brisbane
- In office 1868–1869
- Preceded by: Albert Hockings
- Succeeded by: William Pettigrew

Personal details
- Born: John Hardgrave; 14 April 1826 Ardee, Ireland
- Died: 8 November 1906 (aged 80) Brisbane, Queensland, Australia
- Resting place: Toowong Cemetery
- Spouse: Margaret Lydia Blair (m.1801 d.1924)
- Occupation: Cordwainer

John Hardgrave (14 April 1826 – 8 November 1906) was an alderman and mayor of Brisbane, Queensland, Australia.

== Personal life ==
John Hardgrave was born in Ardee, County Louth, Ireland on 14 April 1826, the son of William Hardgrave (a cordwainer and cobbler) and Elizabeth Smith.

Parents William and Elizabeth immigrated with their children on Neptune leaving Cork Harbour on 26 Oct 1843 and arriving in Sydney on 11 February 1843. William quickly established himself as a cordwainer, assisted by his children including his son John.

In 1848 John then moved to Brisbane (then known as Moreton Bay). As he thought the prospects were better in Brisbane than in Sydney, he encouraged the rest of his family to move from Sydney to Brisbane. On the voyage from Sydney to Brisbane, the family met a young woman from Northern Ireland, Margaret Lydia Blair, who was coming to Brisbane on a six-month contract as a lady's help to the wife of the Church of England minister.

John met and fell in love with Margaret and they were married on 29 July 1850 in Brisbane. They had a number of children:

- Eliza Jane, born Brisbane 1851
- Margaret Ann, born Brisbane 1853
- William Alexander, born Brisbane 1855, died Brisbane 1860
- Philip, born Brisbane 1857, a solicitor
- John Edmund, born Brisbane 1859, died Brisbane 1860
- Frederick Lewis, born Brisbane 1861, a chemist
- Florence, born Brisbane 1864
- Ernest Wensley Stephen, born Brisbane 1869, a surveyor

In 1860 John purchased 6 acres (2.4 hectares) of land in West End, a Brisbane inner suburb. Hardgrave Road in West End is named after him.

John and Margaret had their home on Petrie Terrace (electoral rolls after 1903 show it as 172 Petrie Terrace).

John Hardgrave died in Brisbane on 8 Nov 1906 and his wife Margaret died in Brisbane in 1924 aged 95 years. They are buried in Toowong Cemetery, together with other family members.

== Business life ==
John Hardgrave was in the boot trade and had a business selling Wellington boots on Queen Street.

== Public life ==
John Hardgrave was an alderman of the Brisbane Municipal Council in 1867–1870 (resigning on 20 June 1870) and then from 1876 to 1879. He was mayor in 1868–1869. He then became a member of the Woolloongabba Divisional Board 1882–1885 and was chairman of the Board in 1884. He was subsequently an alderman of the South Brisbane Municipal Council from 1888 to 1890 (resigning on 10 Feb 1890) only to return in 1891–1898.

He served on the following committees:

- Legislative Committee 1867, 1869, 1870, 1877, 1891–1893, 1898
- Lighting Committee 1867, 1870
- Bridge Committee 1868, 1869
- Improvement Committee 1868, 1869, 1870, 1876, 1878.
- Brisbane Board of Waterworks 1875–1902. (Chairman from 23 May 1892)
- Cab Inspection and Licensing Committee 1876
- Finance Committee 1877, 1879, 1891, 1892, 1897
- Parks Committee 1891, 1898
- Municipal Library & School of Arts Committee 1894
- Works Committee 1898
- General Purpose Committee 1898

== See also ==
- List of mayors and lord mayors of Brisbane
- Hardgrave (Australia) Family History
- Hardgrave (Australia) Family History - John Hardgrave
