= Henry Richards (Queensland politician) =

Australian politician

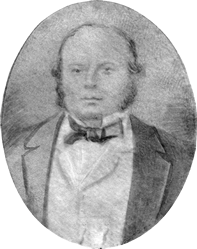

Member of the Queensland Legislative Assembly for Town of South Brisbane
- In office 30 April 1860 – 10 June 1863
- Preceded by: New seat
- Succeeded by: Thomas Stephens

Personal details
- Born: Henry Richards; 1821 England
- Died: 3 April 1868 (aged 46-47) Cardwell, Queensland, Australia
- Spouse: Jane Turkington (m.1850)
- Occupation: Shopkeeper, Police magistrate

Henry Richards (1821—1868) was a politician in Queensland, Australia. He was a Member of the Queensland Legislative Assembly.

== Early life ==
Henry Richards was born in 1821 in England, son of Henry Richards.

He immigrated to New South Wales in 1845 and worked as a merchant. He married Jane Turkington on 24 December 1850 at St James' Church, Sydney by the Reverend Robert Allwood.

He moved to Brisbane in 1859 as the managing partner of Robert Towns & Co.

== Politics ==
Henry Richards was elected to the Queensland Legislative Assembly in the electoral district of Town of South Brisbane at the inaugural 1860 colonial election on 30 April, defeating his opponent Albert John Hockings by 72 votes to 18.

Richards held the seat until the 1863 election on 10 June.

== Later life ==
Henry Richards died suddenly on 3 April 1868 in Cardwell, where he was the Police Magistrate and Sub-collector of Customs.

== See also ==
- Members of the Queensland Legislative Assembly, 1860-1863

Parliament of Queensland
New seat	Member for Town of South Brisbane; 1860–1863	Succeeded by Thomas Stephens
