= William Hendren =

Australian politician

Member of the Queensland Legislative Assembly for Bundamba
- In office 19 November 1878 – 26 Oct 1880
- Preceded by: Simon Fraser
- Succeeded by: James Foote

Personal details
- Born: William Hendren; 1832 Armagh, Ireland
- Died: 3 January 1903 (aged 70–71) Liverpool, New South Wales, Australia
- Spouse: Annie Jenkins (m.1854)
- Occupation: Auctioneer, Storekeeper

William Hendren (1832 - 3 January 1903) was a member of the Queensland Legislative Assembly.

== Biography ==
Hendren was born in Armagh, Ireland, the son of Samuel Hendren and his wife Ann (née McCulloch). After arriving in Australia he worked as a storekeeper and Auctioneer.

In 1854 he married Annie Jenkins and together had three sons and three daughters. Jensen died at Liverpool, New South Wales in January 1903.

== Public career ==
Hendren won the seat of Bundamba at the 1878 Queensland colonial election He resigned from the parliament two years later.

Parliament of Queensland
Preceded by Simon Fraser	Member for Bundamba; 1878–1880	Succeeded by James Foote
