= James Francis Garrick =

Australian politician

The Honourable Sir James Francis Garrick KCMG QC
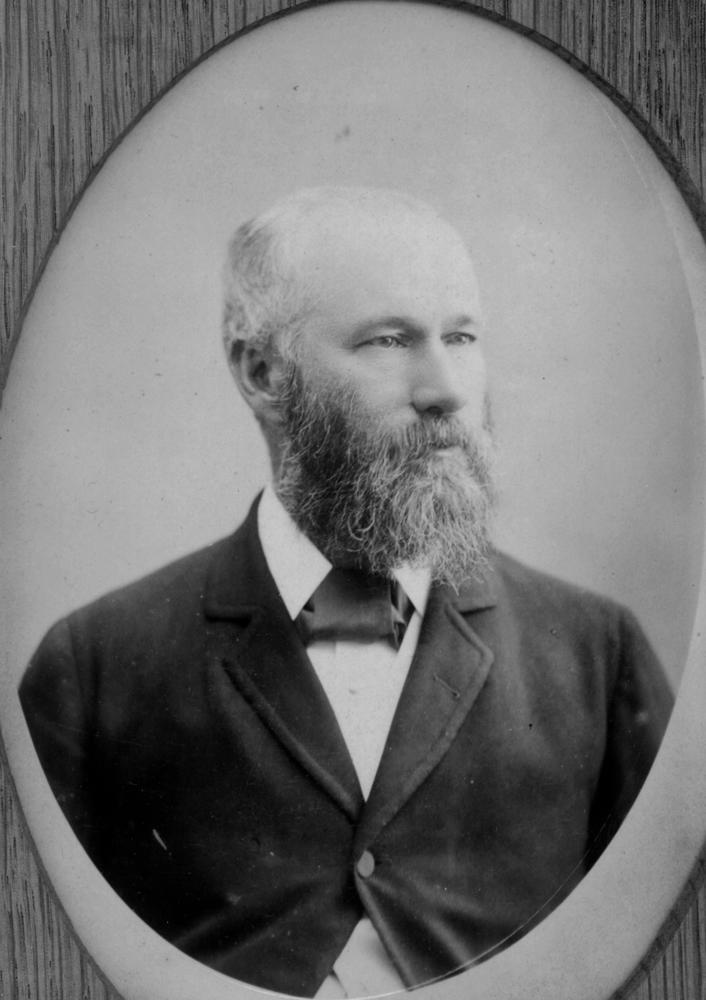

13th Treasurer of Queensland
- In office 13 November 1883 – 31 December 1883
- Preceded by: Archibald Archer
- Succeeded by: James Dickson
- Constituency: Queensland Legislative Council

Member of the Queensland Assembly for East Moreton
- In office 1 July 1867 – 28 September 1868 Serving with Arthur Francis
- Preceded by: Robert Cribb
- Succeeded by: John Douglas
- In office 10 May 1877 – 19 November 1878
- Preceded by: William Fryar
- Succeeded by: Seat abolished

Member of the Queensland Assembly for Moreton
- In office 19 November 1878 – 13 November 1883
- Preceded by: New seat
- Succeeded by: Thomas Macdonald-Paterson

Member of the Queensland Legislative Council
- In office 13 November 1869 – 8 December 1870
- In office 13 November 1883 – 28 August 1894

Personal details
- Born: 10 January 1836 Sydney, Australia
- Died: 12 January 1907 (aged 71) London, England
- Spouse: Catherine Cadell
- Relations: Francis James Garrick (brother); Joseph Garrick (brother)
- Education: Sydney College
- Occupation: Barrister, Agent-General, Judge, Solicitor

Sir James Francis Garrick, KCMG, QC, (10 January 1836 – 12 January 1907), was a politician and agent-general from Brisbane, Queensland, Australia. In his later years, he lived in London.

== Early years ==
Garrick was the second oldest of ten children of James Francis Garrick (b. 1803 in Deptford, Kent, England; d. 1874 in Sydney) and Catherine Eliza Garrick (née Branson, b. 1811 in Gibraltar; d. 1900 in Woollahra, Australia). His parents were married on 10 June 1832 in St Martin-in-the-Fields, Surrey, England. They subsequently emigrated to Sydney to manage a flour milling business.

Garrick was born in Sydney, New South Wales, on 10 January 1836. He was educated at Sydney College. He married Catherine Garrick (née Cadell) on 3 January 1865.

== Legal career ==
Both Garrick and his older brother Francis James (born 1833) were sent to Sydney solicitors to learn the legal trade. The younger brother was admitted to the New South Wales' bar in 1860.

James Francis moved to Brisbane in 1861 where only four attorneys were in practice at that time, whilst Francis James emigrated to New Zealand in February 1864.

Soon after his appointment to the Queensland Legislative Council in 1869, he went to London, where he continued with legal studies and work, and was admitted to the bar in 1873. He returned to Brisbane in 1874, where he was also admitted to the bar. He worked as a crown prosecutor in various districts and was appointed Queen's Counsel (QC) in 1882.

== Political career ==
Garrick was elected to the Legislative Assembly of Queensland (lower house) for the 1867–68 period, representing the East Moreton electorate. In November 1869, he was then appointed to the Queensland Legislative Council (upper house). He went to London soon after, though, and his seat was declared vacant in December 1870 after him missing two sessions.

He represented East Moreton again in 1877–1878, and after East Moreton was abolished, represented Moreton 1878–1883. He was appointed Attorney-General in the Douglas ministry for a short period before the premiership went to Thomas McIlwraith in January 1879. He was an important member of the opposition led by Samuel Griffith. When Griffith took over the premiership in 1883, Garrick was appointed colonial treasurer for a brief period, before taking on the role as postmaster-general, a role that he held until 24 June 1884. Garrick was also appointed again to the Legislative Council, a role that he held from Nov 1883 to August 1894, but for most of the time he was actually in London.

In June 1884, Garrick was appointed as the 5th agent-general for immigration in London. He held this post, with some interruption from 1888 to 1890, until 1895. He was successful of sending many immigrants to Queensland; in his first term, he averaged 10,000 per year.

== Later life and commemoration ==
Garrick remained in London until his death on 12 January 1907. He was survived by his wife and three children; Katherine Cecie Garrick, James Cadell Garrick and Francis Cadell Garrick.

Garrick was appointed Companion of the Order of St Michael and St George (CMG) in 1885, and Knight Commander of the Order of St Michael and St George (KCMG) in 1886.

Garrick's daughter Katherine endowed through her November 1916 will the James Francis Garrick chair of law at the University of Queensland in the memory of her father. The university's senate decided in 1923 on a chair in law, in the faculty of arts, to be called the "James Francis Garrick Professorship of Law". The chair is still in use at the TC Beirne School of Law.

Parliament of Queensland
| Preceded by Robert Cribb | Member for East Moreton; 1867–1868; Served alongside: Arthur Francis | Succeeded by John Douglas |
| Preceded by William Fryar | Member for East Moreton; 1877–1878 | Abolished |
| New seat | Member for Moreton; 1878–1883 | Succeeded by Thomas Macdonald-Paterson |
