= Henry Buckley =

Australian politician

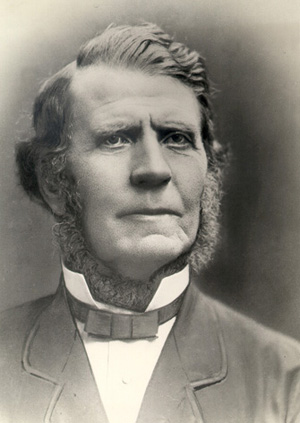

Assembly Member for Stanley County
- In office 9 April 1856 – 11 April 1859
- Preceded by: New seat
- Succeeded by: Seat abolished

Member of the Queensland Legislative Assembly for East Moreton
- In office 17 May 1860 – 29 Sep 1860 Serving with George Edmondstone
- Preceded by: New seat
- Succeeded by: Thomas Warry

Personal details
- Born: June 21, 1813 Yorkshire, England
- Died: April 14, 1888 (aged 74) Brisbane, Queensland
- Resting place: Toowong Cemetery
- Spouse: Barbara Graham
- Occupation: Accountant, Grazier, Magistrate, Squatter

Henry Buckley (21 June 1813 – 14 April 1888) was an Australian politician. He was a member of the New South Wales Legislative Assembly for two terms between 1856 and 1859 and after the creation of the separate colony of Queensland he became a member of the Legislative Assembly of Queensland.

== Early life ==
Buckley was born in Yorkshire, Northern England, and was the son of a wool merchant. He was educated at a Moravian Boys' School in Fairfield near Manchester and emigrated to Sydney in 1834. He initially worked as a merchant but soon made a substantial fortune and purchased pastoral land near Queanbeyan. He moved to Brisbane in 1849 and continued to act as a merchant and as an agent for insurance firms.

== Colonial Parliament ==
The area which is now Queensland was part of New South Wales when responsible self-government was initially granted to that colony in 1856. At the first election for the New South Wales Legislative Assembly Buckley won the seat of Stanley County which was based on the hinterland of Brisbane. He retained the seat at the 1858 election but the seat was abolished prior to the 1859 election, which Buckley did not contest. However, at the first elections held after Queensland became a separate colony in 1860, he won the seat of East Moreton in the Legislative Assembly of Queensland. He resigned from parliament later that year to become Queensland's Auditor-general.

Buckley died in 1888 and was buried in Toowong Cemetery.

== Street name ==
A number of street names in the Brisbane suburb of Carina Heights are identical to the surnames of former Members of the Queensland Legislative Assembly. One of these is Buckley Street.

New South Wales Legislative Assembly
New seat	Member for Stanley County; 1856 - 1859	Succeeded by Seat abolished
Parliament of Queensland
New seat	Member for East Moreton; 1860 – 1860; Served alongside: George Edmondstone	Succeeded by Thomas Warry
