= Charles Blakeney (Australian politician) =

Australian politician

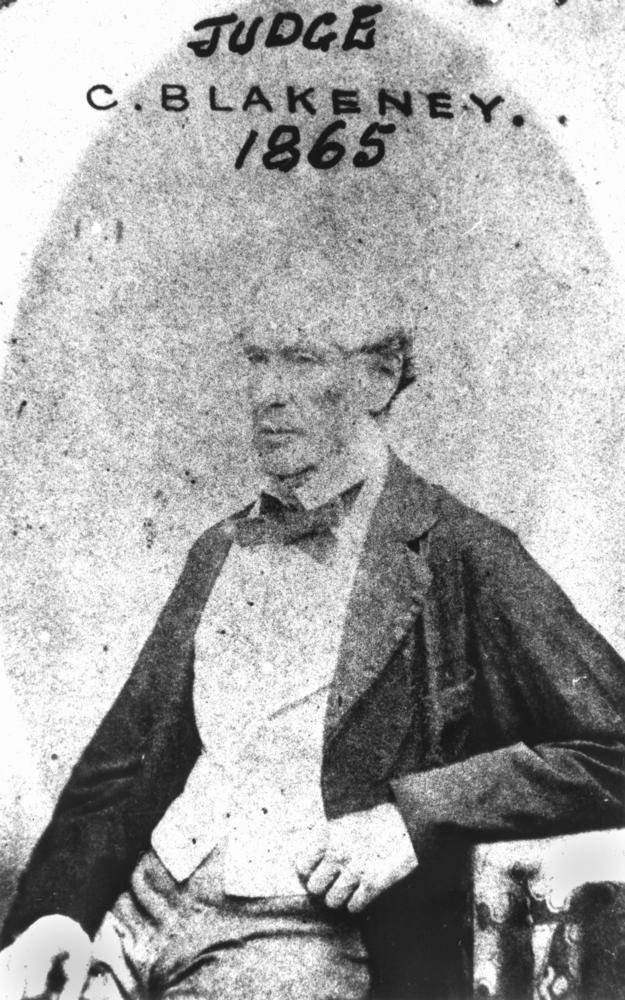
- Charles William Blakeney, circa 1865

Member of the Queensland Legislative Assembly for Town Of Brisbane
- In office 11 May 1860 – 25 November 1865 Serving with George Raff, William Brookes, Henry Jordan, Robert Cribb, Theophilus Pugh
- Preceded by: New seat
- Succeeded by: George Raff

Personal details
- Born: Charles William Blakeney; 15 July 1802 County Roscommon, Ireland
- Died: 12 January 1876 (aged 73) Brisbane, Queensland, Australia
- Resting place: South Brisbane Cemetery
- Spouse: Ellen Frances Jeffries
- Relations: William Newcome (grandfather), William Blakeney, Charles John Blakeney (sons), Alicia Honoria *Blakeney (daughter)
- Occupation: Barrister, Judge, Member of Legislative council

Charles William Blakeney (1802 – 1876) was a judge and politician in Queensland, Australia.

== Early life ==
Charles William Blakeney was born in Cooltigue Castle, County Roscommon, Ireland in 1802. He was the eldest son of Reverend Thomas Blakeney and his wife Alicia Newcome, daughter of Archbishop William Newcome, primate of Ireland.

He went to study at Trinity College, Dublin in January 1820 but never completed a degree.

In 1826 he married Ellen Frances, the daughter of John and Julia Jeffries of Blarney Castle, County Cork. They had three children:

- Charles John Blakeney (1830–1892)
- William Theophilus Blakeney (1832–1898)
- Alicia Honoria Blakeney (1833– )

In 1831 he became a barrister in London and in Ireland in 1836.

== Decision to immigrate ==
Following the death of his father in 1845, he inherited the family property, Holywell, in County Roscommon from which he derived a rental income of £1500 per annum. However, he led an extravagant life and eventually lost his assets through his gambling debts. An obituary published at the time of his death suggested that he had lost his estates due to the effects of the Irish Famine, as landholders were required to provide relief for their tenants. His son William Theophilus had already immigrated to New South Wales so Charles Blakeney decided to immigrate too, where he became a barrister in the Northern Circuit Court of Moreton Bay, moving to Brisbane in 1859. His other children Charles John and Alicia also immigrated to Australia around the same time.

== Public life ==
He was elected a Member of the Queensland Legislative Assembly for the seat of Town of Brisbane from 11 May 1860 to 25 November 1865. He was Chairman of Committees from 12 June 1861 to 22 May 1863.

He resigned in order to take up appointment as the first judge of the Western District Court, which covered Condamine, Dalby and Roma.

=== Trial of Harry Redford ===
As the judge, Charles Blakeney presided over the 1873 trial of Harry Redford (sometimes spelled Readford) at Roma Courthouse. Redford was a cattle rustler, who is believed to be the inspiration for the fictional character Captain Starlight in the novel Robbery Under Arms. In 1870, Redford was working as a stockman on Bowen Downs Station near Longreach in Queensland, where, with two associates, George Dewdney and William Rooke, he stole about 1,000 cattle. Knowing the cattle would be easily identified by their cattle brands in Queensland, he drove the cattle through the inhospitable terrain of the Channel Country and the Strzelecki Desert to South Australia where he sold the cattle for £5,000.

Redford was apprehended in Sydney in 1872, and faced trial in Roma, Queensland; Redford's solicitor was Charles William Blakeney's son, Charles John Blakeney. Despite the compelling evidence presented by the prosecutor, the jury members were so impressed by Redford's achievements in taking the cattle to South Australia that they found him not guilty, whereupon Charles Blakeney remarked, "Thank God, gentlemen, that verdict is yours and not mine!" In response to the apparent disregard for justice shown by the verdict, in July 1873, the Government shut down the Roma District Criminal Court for two years but rescinded the order in January 1874.

== Later life ==
Charles owned various properties in Brisbane during his life in Australia. His former home "Beaumont" on the corner of Gladstone Road and Gloucester St. was burnt in a massive fire in 1884, after his death when the property had passed to his widow Ellen and was being rented. Another property in Rocklea known as "The Hermitage", on Ipswich Road was also sold after his death.

Around 1874, Charles began suffering from strokes, of which were starting to have other comorbid affects, such as paralytic symptoms and fits. He shortly thereafter resigned his position as Judge, and retired into public life before his passing. On 12 January 1876, he left his home to take a morning walk along the Brisbane river between Hill End and West End, but failed to return. A few days later his body was found floating in the Brisbane River, his walking stick was found standing upright in the river bank close to where his body was found. His lovely and devoted wife Ellen, survived him until the late 1890s. On 14 January 1876, he was buried in South Brisbane Cemetery at Dutton Park.

Parliament of Queensland
New seat	Member for Town Of Brisbane; 1860–1865; Served alongside: George Raff, William Brookes, Henry Jordan, Robert Cribb, Theophilus Pugh	Succeeded by George Raff
