= Robert Cribb =

Australian politician

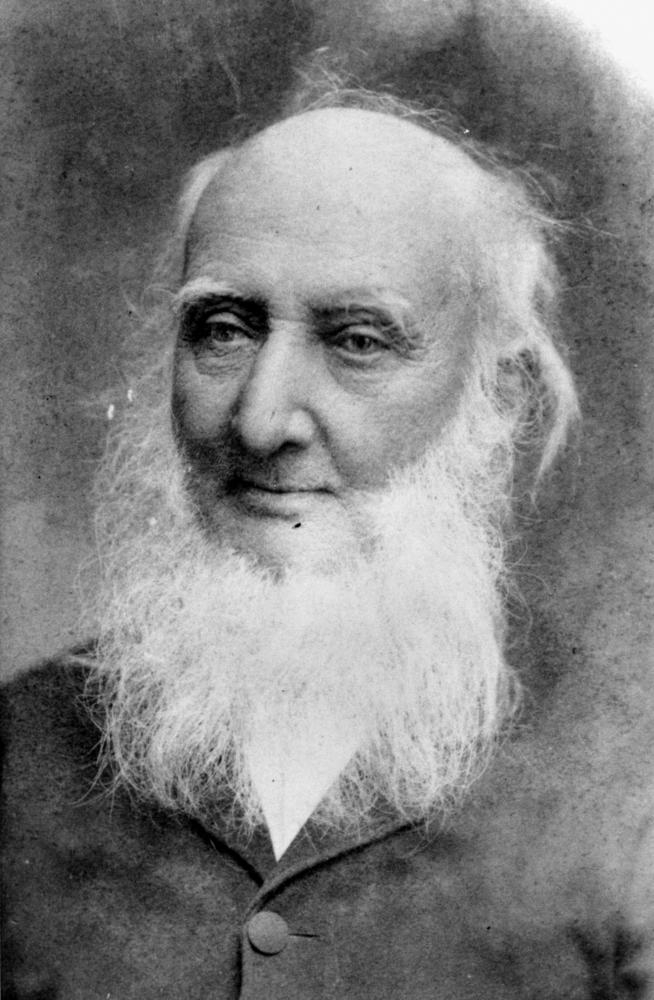

Member of the New South Wales Legislative Assembly for East Moreton
- In office 18 June 1859 – 10 December 1859
- Preceded by: New seat
- Succeeded by: Seat abolished

Member of the Queensland Legislative Assembly for Town of Brisbane
- In office 8 December 1860 – 30 May 1863 Serving with Charles Blakeney, George Raff
- Preceded by: Henry Jordan
- Succeeded by: Theophilus Pugh

Member of the Queensland Legislative Assembly for East Moreton
- In office 26 September 1863 – 1 July 1867 Serving with George Edmondstone
- Preceded by: William Brookes
- Succeeded by: James Garrick

Personal details
- Born: 7 January 1805 Poole, Dorset, England
- Died: 16 April 1893 (aged 88) Milton, Brisbane, Queensland
- Resting place: Toowong Cemetery
- Spouse: Sarah Sanson
- Relations: Benjamin Cribb (brother)
- Occupation: Baker, Land agent

Robert Cribb (7 January 1805 – 16 April 1893) was an Australian parliamentarian who represented the district of East Moreton in the New South Wales Legislative Assembly, and the districts of Town of Brisbane and East Moreton in the Queensland Legislative Assembly after the separation of Queensland from New South Wales. Cribb's brother Benjamin Cribb also served as a member of the colonial parliaments of both New South Wales and Queensland.

== Early life ==
Cribb was born in 1805 in the town of Poole, Dorset, England into a rigidly Nonconformist family. Cribb's father, John Galpin Cribb, was a mariner and ship owner, operating to Newfoundland and the Mediterranean; young Robert and his brother Benjamin sometimes accompanied their father. However, this ended when their father was killed in action during the Napoleonic Wars. Following his father's death, Cribb's mother Mary Cribb (née Dirham) apprenticed Robert and his brother Benjamin to two merchants. By 1832, Robert had settled in Covent Garden where he owned a local bakery. By the age of 22, Robert had married Sarah Sanson of Wareham.

Cribb held views that were considered radical at the time, and was a committed member of the Anti-Corn Law League, as well as being a follower of radical politicians Richard Cobden and John Bright. After reading John Dunmore Lang's work "Cooksland," Robert emigrated to Australia aboard the Fortitude with his wife, four of his five children, and three other relatives, arriving on 20 January 1849.

== Establishing in Brisbane ==
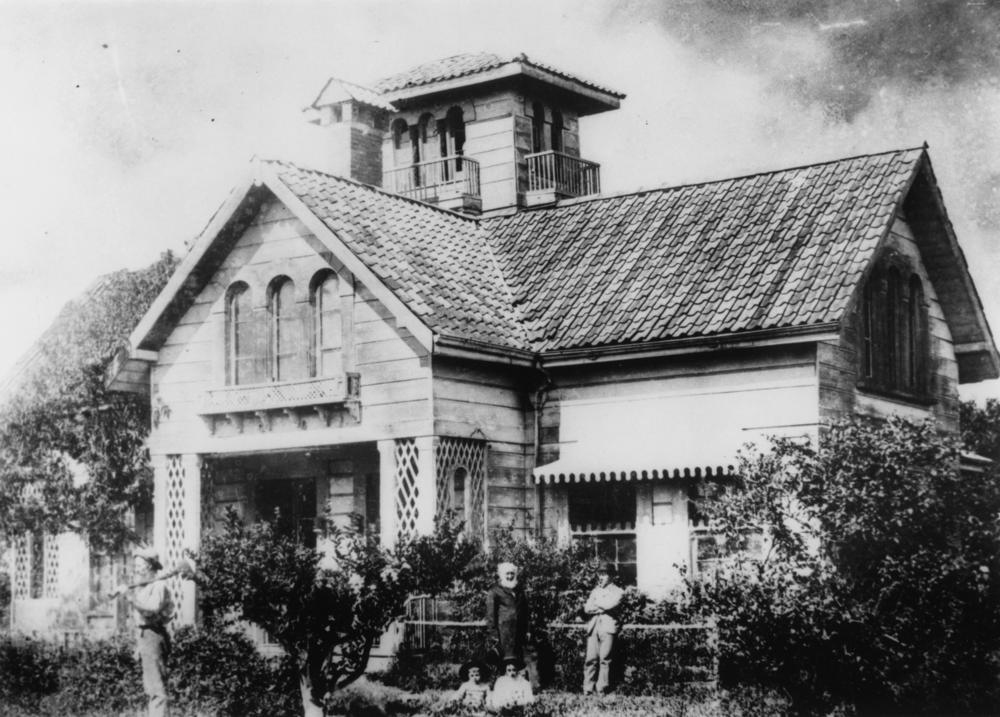
Robert Cribb (white haired) and others, in front of Cribb's Dunmore House on River Road (now Coronation Drive), circa 1886

Upon his arrival in Australia, Cribb settled in Brisbane where he first acquired a bakery on Queen Street between Edward and Albert streets, and then extensive landholdings around the growing city.

In March 1852, Robert Cribb purchased land around the area of Cribb Street, Milton today; the street bears his name today. In December 1853, he bought 39 acres in what is today the suburb of Auchenflower. The land was bordered by Western Creek (now mostly culvertised), Indooroopilly Road (now Milton Road), the River Road (now Coronation Drive) alongside the Brisbane River and Chasely Street. He called this Lang Farm (in honour of John Dunmore Lang) and he grew oranges, potatoes, cabbages, mulberries and olives. He built a house called Dunmore (again honouring John Dunmore Lang) on River Road close to where Lang Parade intersects today.

On 15 October 1857, his wife Sarah died at Ipswich aged 57 years.

On 1 August 1860, he married for a second time to Sarah Walton in Ipswich, but she died on 3 January 1870 and was buried in Toowong Cemetery.

== Politics ==
Robert Cribb became involved in local politics, earning the nickname "Robert the Restless" from the local press due to his nonconformist liberal and radical views. He was elected as a member of the New South Wales Legislative Assembly representing the seat of East Moreton in June 1859, serving briefly until the seat was abolished due to the separation of the new colony of Queensland from New South Wales on 10 December 1859.

During this time he also served as an alderman on the Brisbane Municipal Council from 1859 to 1861.

Cribb was then elected at a by-election to be one of three members for the seat of Town of Brisbane, which took in areas of Brisbane north of the Brisbane River, following the resignation from Parliament of Henry Jordan. He represented this district until 1863, when he switched to the seat of East Moreton, which covered much of the area of the south-east corner of the colony, excluding the areas around the settlements of Brisbane and Ipswich.

On 17 February 1870, Arthur Francis, member for East Moreton, resigned due to insolvency, and a by-election was called. On the nomination day, 19 February 1870, there were two candidates: Cribb and Robert Travers Atkin. In his nomination speech, Atkin made accusations against Cribb, who replied vigorously defending himself. The somewhat unexpected outcome of this verbal exchange was that Cribb announced he would withdraw his nomination. Cribb said that if Atkin believed he could represent them so well, the best thing they could do would be to let him try, predicting that Atkin would either resign or be asked to resign within six months. Being the only remaining candidate, Atkin was declared elected. Cribb's six-month prediction did not come true. However, Atkin did not complete his term, as he resigned on 7 March 1872 due to serious ill health (pulmonary tuberculosis).

Although Brisbane had a municipal council since 1859, the area within that local authority was quite small and it was not until 1879 that local government was established in the area where Robert Cribb lived. In 1879 he would have been living within the Indooroopilly Division but shortly after in 1880 eastern part of Indooroopilly Division (the more populated districts) were separated to create the Shire of Toowong. Robert Cribb was a councillor of the shire from 21 June 1880 to 1 February 1881, representing the South Ward, and then a much longer period of service from 7 February 1882 to 4 February 1890, also representing the South Ward. He was president of the shire from 1885 to 1887. Although he stood for election to the shire council in both 1890 and 1891, he was unsuccessful.

Cribb was a founder of the Queensland Liberal Association, and advocated strongly for the separation of Queensland from New South Wales, and for the abolition of forced labour within the new colony, whether by kanakas, convicts, or indentured labourers.

Consistent with Nonconformist beliefs, he vigorously supported the separation of Church and State. He also sought to allow a man to marry his deceased wife's sister (which was then forbidden). He was committed to Chartism.

Like Cribb, his brother Benjamin was also a member of both the NSW and Queensland parliaments, while two of his nephews Thomas, and James, also served in the Queensland Parliament.

== Later life ==
Robert Cribb died in his home Dunmore on River Road (now Coronation Drive) on 16 April 1893. He was buried on 17 April 1893 at Toowong Cemetery.

== See also ==
- Members of the New South Wales Legislative Assembly, 1859–1860
- Members of the Queensland Legislative Assembly, 1860–1863; 1863–1867

New South Wales Legislative Assembly
New district	Member for East Moreton; 1859	Separation of Queensland
Parliament of Queensland
Preceded by Henry Jordan	Member for Town of Brisbane; 1860 – 1863; Served alongside: Charles Blakeney, George Raff	Succeeded by Theophilus Pugh
Preceded by William Brookes	Member for East Moreton; 1863 – 1867; Served alongside: George Edmondstone	Succeeded by James Garrick
