= Simon Fraser (Queensland politician) =

Australian politician (1824–1889)

Member of the Queensland Legislative Assembly for Town Of Brisbane
- In office 26 September 1868 – 17 August 1870 Serving with Kevin O'Doherty, Theophilus Pugh, George Edmondstone
- Preceded by: Alexander Pritchard
- Succeeded by: Ratcliffe Pring

Member of the Queensland Legislative Assembly for Bundamba
- In office 29 November 1873 – 19 November 1878
- Preceded by: New seat
- Succeeded by: William Hendren

Member of the Queensland Legislative Assembly for Brisbane South
- In office 6 April 1880 – 12 May 1888
- Preceded by: Angus Mackay
- Succeeded by: Henry Jordan

Personal details
- Born: Simon Fraser; 1824 Inverness, Scotland
- Died: 8 January 1889 (Aged 64 or 65) Brisbane, Queensland, Australia
- Resting place: South Brisbane Cemetery
- Spouse: Lucy Ann Simpson (m.1856 d.1930)
- Occupation: Ironmonger, Auctioneer

Simon Fraser (1824 – 8 January 1889) was an Australian auctioneer and member of the Queensland Legislative Assembly.

== Early years ==
Fraser was born in Inverness, Scotland, to parents Alexander Fraser and his wife Janet. Educated at Inverness, he ran an ironmongery business in Liverpool before leaving for Queensland in 1862. With John Buckland, he founded the partnership of Fraser & Buckland, auctioneers with the business later becoming Fraser & Son. Based in Queen Street, Brisbane, Fraser & Son were land and commission agents as well as stock, station and produce brokers.

== Political career ==
Fraser was a member of the Legislative Assembly of Queensland, during which time he represented three seats: Town Of Brisbane from 1868 to 1870, Bundamba from 1873 to 1878, and Brisbane South from 1880 to 1888. From 1884 to 1888, he was Chairman of Committees and carried out the role with "the strictest impartiality and conscientiousness in the discharge of his duties".

Always sitting and voting with the liberal members of the house and although a dull speaker, he was greatly respected by the other members. Fraser was a member of the Board of Education in 1874, and supported free, secular, compulsory education to primary level. He also held the view however that the government should not subsidise secondary or advanced education since this would not promote self-reliance and independence.

== Personal life ==
On 5 September 1856, Fraser married Lucy Ann Simpson (died 1930) in London and together had 3 sons and five daughters. He was greatly interested in church work and had been involved with the Grey Street Congregational Church since its establishment in 1866. Fraser also helped form the Brisbane Sunday School Union and was its president on three occasions.

Fraser died in January 1889 at his home, Torbreck, in Highgate Hill. His funeral was held at his residence the next day and proceeded to the South Brisbane Cemetery.

Parliament of Queensland
Preceded by Alexander Pritchard	Member for Town Of Brisbane; 1868–1870; Served alongside: Kevin O'Doherty, Theophilus Pugh, George Edmondstone	Succeeded by Ratcliffe Pring
New seat	Member for Bundamba; 1873–1878	Succeeded by William Hendren
Preceded by Angus Mackay	Member for Brisbane South; 1880–1888	Succeeded by Henry Jordan
