= William Theophilus Blakeney =

Queensland public servant

Personal details
- Born: 1832
- Died: 1898 (aged 65–66)

William Theophilus Blakeney (1832–1898) was the Registrar-General of Queensland.

== Public life ==
Having arrived in New South Wales in 1853, Blakeney spent a few years in commerce. He became a public servant in the New South Wales Sheriff's Office in 1856. In 1859 he moved to the new colony of Queensland to take up a similar role in the Sheriff's Office in the newly established Queensland Public Service. In 1861 he was appointed the first under-sheriff of Queensland.

In 1865 William Blakeney was appointed Deputy Registrar-General, a post he held until 1883 when he was appointed the Registrar-General of Queensland. In these roles he was called upon to give evidence in court cases relating to alleged bigamy.

William Blakeney was Registrar for Friendly Societies in Queensland. and also Registrar for Patents in Queensland.

He was appointed one of the original trustees of South Brisbane Cemetery in 1866.

He frequently served as returning officer for elections.

He authored a number of documents:

- "Law relating to registration of patents, designs, and trade marks in Queensland" (1890)
- "Queensland : its population, area, resources, etc" (1893)
- "Letters of registration granted for inventions during the year 1884 and part of the year 1885 : with abridgements of specifications in each case / compiled from the original documents in the office of the registrar of patents, Brisbane" (1895)

== Private life ==
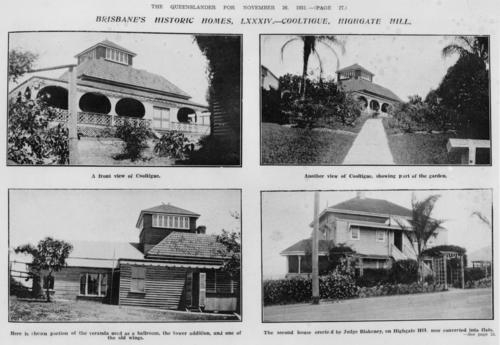
Cooltigue, historic home of William Theophilus Blakeney, Highgate Hill, Brisbane

William Theophilus Blakeney was born on 9 September 1832 at his family home, Cooltigue Castle, County Roscommon, Ireland, the son of Charles William Blakeney and his wife Ellen Frances Jeffries.

In 1853 he immigrated from Ireland to New South Wales.

On 31 March 1853 William Blakeney married Eliza Louise Carr (born County Galway, Ireland, daughter of Frederick Carr and ). The couple had the following children:

- Charles William (born & died New South Wales 1854)
- Ellen Frances (born New South Wales 1855, married Thomas Henry Bowman Barron 1871)
- Elizabeth Amy Augusta (born Sydney 1857, died Sydney 1858)
- Amy Emma (born Sydney 1858, married Charles Ridley-Smith 1875)
- Kate Mary (born Brisbane 1860, died Brisbane 1881)
- Caroline Jane (born Brisbane 1863, died Brisbane 1866)
- Mabel Henrietta (born Brisbane 1865, married George Edward Elliott 1892)
- Louisa Grace (born Brisbane 1866, married Dr Sidney Legge)
- Gertrude Isabel (born Brisbane 1870, married Stuart Brownrigg Leishman 1904)

Some time in the early-mid-1860s the couple built a home 'Cooltigue' set in 16 acres of land in the suburb Highgate Hill, which in 1931 was described as one of Brisbane's historic homes. It was named after the family home in Ireland.

William Blakeney died at his home in South Brisbane on 26 June 1898 at the age of 65 years. He was buried in South Brisbane Cemetery (of which he had been trustee) on 27 June 1898. His wife died on 6 April 1907 and is buried with him and some of their children in South Brisbane Cemetery.

Blakeney Street is named after him (it passed through or by the Cooltigue property). The parallel Julia Street is named after his maternal grandmother, Julia Jefferies. His parents owned a property on the corner of Gladstone road and Gloucester Sts, which was burnt in a massive fire, some time in the 1890s. The land behind his parents house was subdivided and sold in a land estate sale. The nearby Louisa, Mabel and Gertrude Sts are named after his three youngest daughters.
