= Robert Stewart (Australian politician) =

Australian politician

Robert Muter Stewart JP
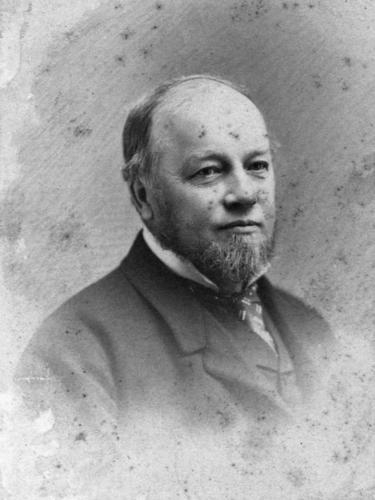

Member of the Queensland Legislative Assembly for Brisbane City
- In office 14 November 1873 – 1 February 1878
- Preceded by: New seat
- Succeeded by: Ratcliffe Pring

Personal details
- Born: Robert Muter Stewart; 17 December 1831 Glasgow, Scotland
- Died: 17 September 1908 (aged 76) Hove, England
- Spouse(s): Elizabeth, widow of Alexander Hume
- Occupation: Banking industry

Robert Muter Stewart, J. P., (17 December 1831 – 17 September 1908) was a member of the Queensland Legislative Assembly, and acted as Colonial Secretary in the George Thorn and John Douglas Ministries from June 1876 to March 1877.

Stewart was born in Glasgow, Scotland. Stewart was a member for Brisbane City in the Queensland Parliament from 14 November 1873 to 1 February 1878. Stewart later resided in London and was a member of the Board of Advice to the Agent-General, and a director on the London Board of the Queensland National Bank.

Stewart died in Hove, England on 17 September 1908.

Parliament of Queensland
New seat	Member for Brisbane City; 1873–1878	Succeeded by Ratcliffe Pring
