= Robert Travers Atkin =

Australian politician

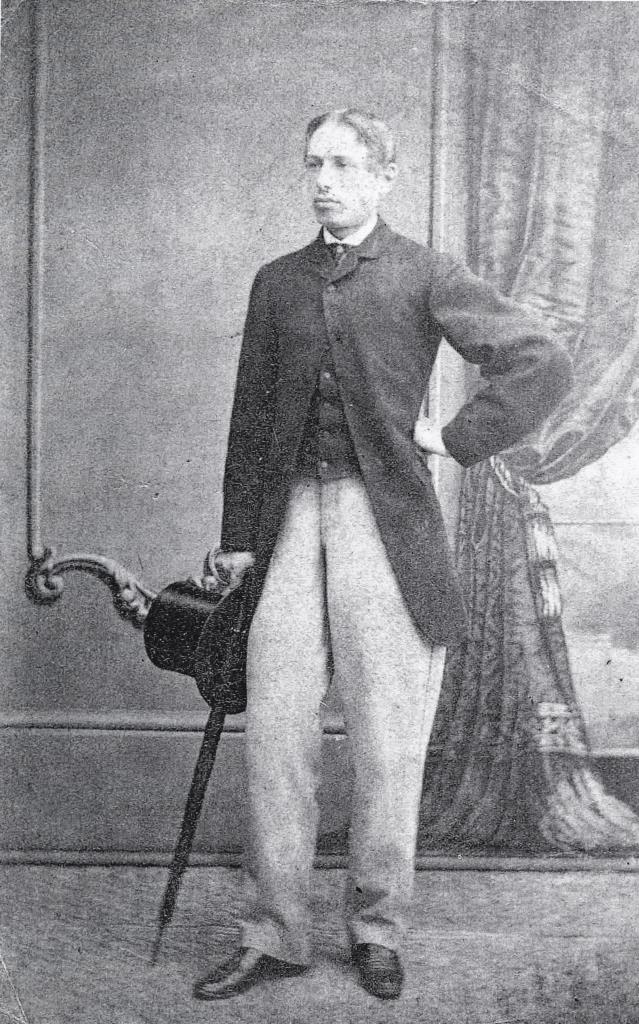

Member of the Queensland Legislative Assembly for Clermont
- In office 1 October 1868 – 29 January 1869
- Preceded by: John Scott
- Succeeded by: Oscar John De Satge

Member of the Queensland Legislative Assembly for Member for East Moreton
- In office 17 February 1870 – 7 March 1872 Serving with Henry Jordan
- Preceded by: Arthur Francis
- Succeeded by: Samuel Griffith

Personal details
- Born: 29 November 1841 Fernill, Clonakilty, County Cork, Ireland
- Died: 25 May 1872 (aged 30) Sandgate, Queensland
- Spouse: Mary Elizabeth Ruck
- Relations: Richard Atkin, Baron Atkin (son)
- Occupation: Journalist, Newspaper editor, Newspaper proprietor

Robert Travers Atkin (29 November 1841 – 25 May 1872) was an Irish-born newspaper editor and politician in colonial Queensland, Australia. He was a Member of the Queensland Legislative Assembly.

== Early life ==
Atkin was born in Fernhill, County Cork, Ireland, the son of William Francis Atkin and his wife Alice Hungerford (née Stewart). In 1864 he married Mary Elizabeth née Ruck (1842–1920) and soon emigrated to Australia intending to take up sheep farming. However, little more than a year into their enterprise Robert was badly injured in a fall from a horse and the couple moved to Brisbane where Atkin became a journalist and politician. He had three sons in Brisbane, but in 1871, Mary took the children back to her own mother's house, "Pantlludw" on the River Dovey in Wales.

== Newspaper editor ==
Atkin became editor of the Brisbane Guardian but resigned over policy disagreements. In partnership with W. C. Belbridge, Atkin started the Queensland Express in August 1868, but the paper lasted less than three years.

== Politician ==
On 1 October 1868, Atkin was elected to the Legislative Assembly of Queensland for the seat of Clermont. He resigned on 29 January 1869, claiming it was the only honourable course of action due to "the treachery, the weakness, and the lust for office" of the leaders of the Queensland Parliament. However, it was suggested that he resigned before his election was voided because his nomination was invalid.

On 17 February 1870, Arthur Francis, member for East Moreton, resigned due to insolvency, and a by-election was called. On nomination day, 19 February 1870, there were two candidates: Atkin and Robert Cribb (who had previously represented the electorate from 1863 to 1867). In his nomination speech, Atkin made accusations against Cribb, who replied vigorously defending himself. The somewhat unexpected outcome of this verbal exchange was that Cribb announced he would withdraw his nomination. Cribb said that if Atkin believed he could represent them so well, the best thing they could do would be to let him try, predicting that Atkin would either resign or be asked to resign within six months. Being the only remaining candidate, Atkin was declared elected.

Cribb's six-month prediction did not come true. However, Atkin did not complete his term, as he resigned on 7 March 1872 due to serious ill health (pulmonary tuberculosis).

== Later life ==
Atkin died at Sandgate, Queensland on 25 May 1872, aged only 30. At his request, he was buried in Sandgate on the crest of the rise on which he had enjoyed sitting under the shade of the trees and looking out onto Moreton Bay. He was buried in his full regimental regalia of the Queensland voluntary militia. His will provided £50 to build a church beside his grave. This was the first St Margaret's church (now the rectory). A monument was erected to his memory by the members of the Hibernian Society of Queensland, of which he was vice-president. The stone was donated by Joshua Jeays from his quarry at Woogaroo and the memorial was completed in November 1872. The inscription on the monument says:

Erected by members of the Hibernian Society of Queensland in memory of their late Vice-president, Robert Travers Atkin, born at Fern Hill, County Cork, Ireland, November 29th, 1841. Died at Sandgate, Queensland, May 25th, 1872. His days were few but his labours and attainments bore the stamp of a wise maturity

This broken column symbolises the irreparable loss of a man who well represented some of the finest characteristics of the Celtic race — its rich humour and subtle wit, its fervid passion and genial warmth of heart. Distinguished alike in the press and parliament of Queensland by large and elevated views, remarkable powers of organization and unswerving advocacy of the popular cause. His rare abilities were especially devoted to the promotion of a patriotic union amongst his countrymen irrespective of class or creed combined with a loyal allegiance to the land of their adoption.

In 1876, Atkin's sister, journalist and teacher Grace Travers Atkin was buried alongside her brother. The monument was further inscribed:

In memory of Grace T. Atkin, died January 26th, 1876, aged 32 years. Blessed are the pure in heart for they shall see God.

After many years of neglect, the memorial was becoming in danger of falling over, so the rector Arthur McDonald Hassell wrote to Atkin's son, Baron James Atkin, who sent money for the memorial to be repaired and to establish a memorial within the church itself. Two months of work was required to make the memorial safe and was undertaken by W.R. Petrie. In February 1937 carvings by Daphne Mayo were added to St Margarets Church at Sandgate as a memorial to Atkin. They were unveiled by the Queensland Governor, Leslie Wilson, and dedicated by Archdeacon Stevenson on 21 February 1937. Although the monument had originally been surrounded by pepperina trees, the rector had them cut down so the memorial would be more visible.

== Robert Travers Atkin memorial ==
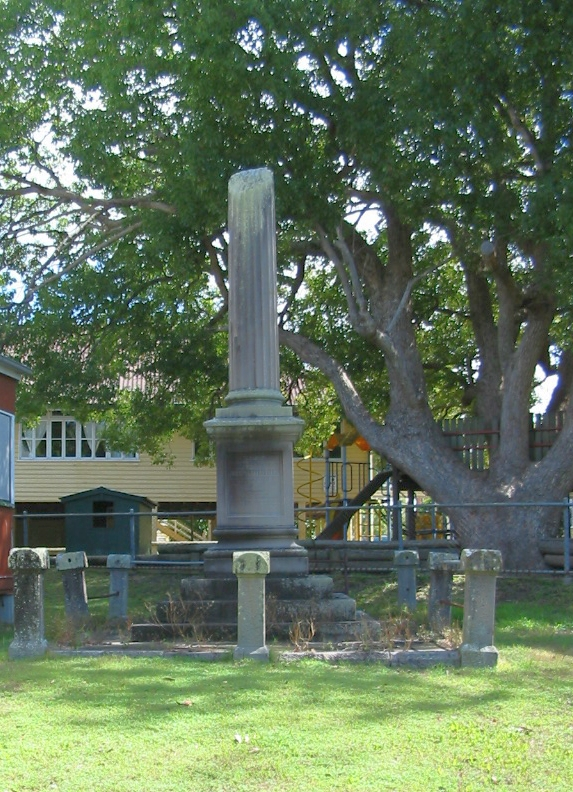
Robert Travers Atkin memorial, St Margaret's Anglican Church, Sandgate, 2005

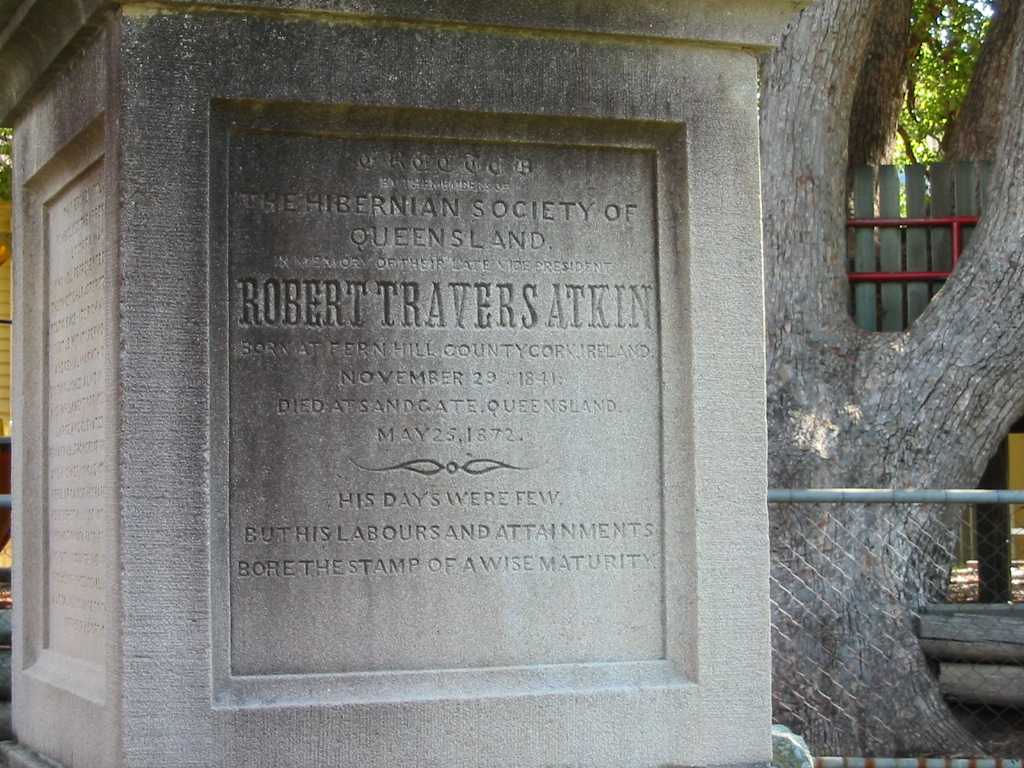
Detail of the memorial (side 1)

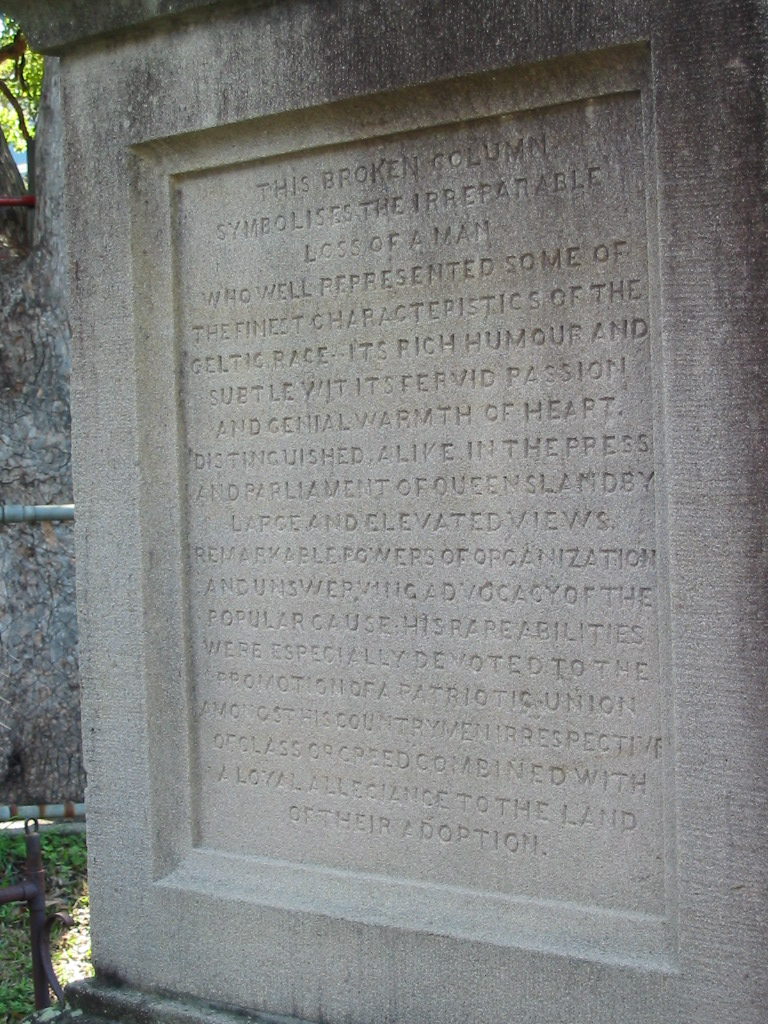
Detail of the memorial (side 2)

Parliament of Queensland
| Preceded by John Scott | Member for Clermont; 1868 – 1869 | Succeeded by Oscar John De Satge |
| Preceded by Arthur Francis | Member for East Moreton; 1870 – 1872; Served alongside: Henry Jordan | Succeeded by Samuel Griffith |
