= George Edmondstone =

Australian politician

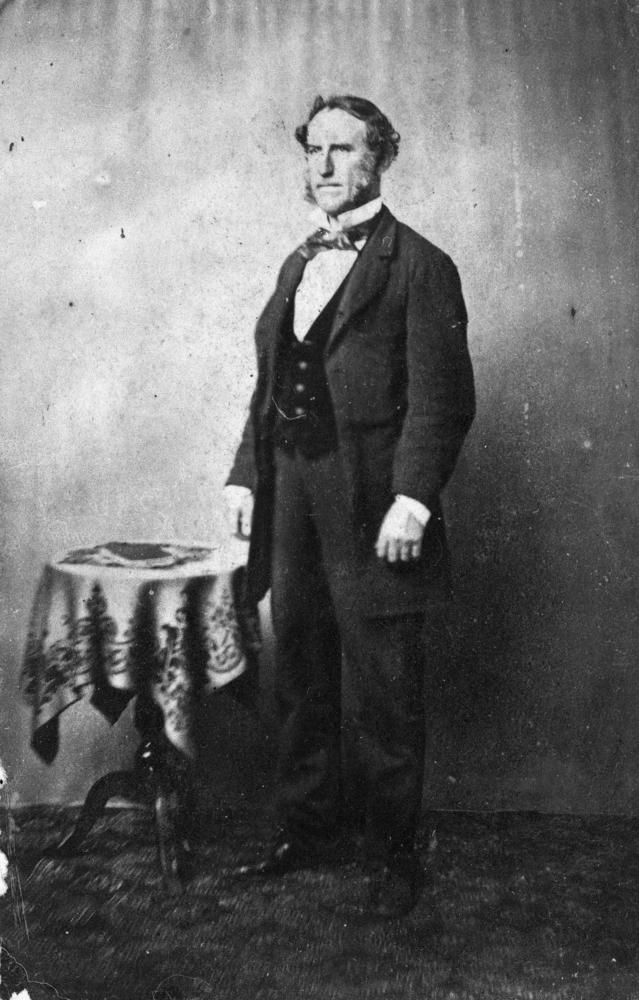
- George Edmondstone in 1863.

Member of the Queensland Legislative Assembly for East Moreton
- In office 7 May 1860 – 1 July 1867 Serving with Henry Buckley, Thomas Warry, William Brookes, Robert Cribb
- Preceded by: New seat
- Succeeded by: Arthur Francis

Member of the Queensland Legislative Assembly for Town of Brisbane
- In office 11 February 1869 – 14 November 1873 Serving with Alexander Pritchard, Simon Fraser, Ratcliffe Pring, John Handy, Kevin O'Doherty
- Preceded by: Theophilus Pugh
- Succeeded by: Abolished

Member of the Queensland Legislative Assembly for Wickham
- In office 18 November 1873 – 28 April 1877
- Preceded by: New seat
- Succeeded by: Albert John Hockings

Member of the Queensland Legislative Council
- In office 12 May 1877 – 23 February 1883

Personal details
- Born: May 4, 1809 Edinburgh, Scotland
- Died: February 23, 1883 (aged 73) Brisbane, Queensland
- Resting place: Toowong Cemetery
- Spouse: Alexis Telleray
- Occupation: Butcher

George Edmondstone (1809–1883) was politician in Queensland, Australia. He was a Member of the Queensland Legislative Assembly and an alderman and mayor in the Brisbane Municipal Council.

The surname is spelled 'Edmonstone' in the Brisbane City Council Archives, spelled 'Edmundston' on his father's marriage banns, spelled 'Edmondston' on his baptismal certificate and Edmondstone on his father's Testament.

== Personal life ==
George Edmondstone was born on 4 May 1809 in Edinburgh, Scotland, the son of William Edmondstone, a naval commissary, and Alexandrina (Alixa) Farquharson daughter of a watchmaker. George's father died when he was 12 and he migrated to New South Wales in 1832. Later he went to Hobart Town and after some hard times began business in Sydney. He then moved to Maitland and about 1840 he took up Normanby Plains Station (near Warrill View on the Cunningham Highway). He sold out early in 1842 and set up as a butcher in Brisbane, hoping to profit from trade with the newly settled Darling Downs. He had married Alexis Telleray in 1837 in New South Wales (her name appears in the Queensland records as Alexandrina Tillery, the confusion most likely stems from transcriptions of original handwritten records).

George was in the first group of free settlers to arrive in Brisbane in 1840.

He built a house called "Pahroombin".

In his later years, George was described by his peers as a genial, amiable, old gentleman. He died in Brisbane on Friday 23 Feb 1883. His funeral notice appeared in the Brisbane Courier and said:

FUNERAL NOTICE. -- The Friends of

Mr. GEORGE EDMONDSTONE, deceased,
are respectfully invited to attend his FUNERAL;
to leave his late residence, Pahroombin, Break-
fast Creek, THIS (Saturday) AFTERNOON, at
4 o'clock for the General Cemetery.
WALTER BARRETT,
Undertaker,

2776 Petrie Bight.

At that time, the "General Cemetery" of Brisbane was Toowong Cemetery.

== Business life ==
George Edmondstone had a butchery in Queen Street, the main street of Brisbane.

== Public life ==
George was a founding alderman (1859–1866) of the Brisbane Municipal Council and its mayor in 1863. He served on a number of committees including:

- Legislative Committee 1859–1865
- Lighting Committee 1862
- Incorporation Committee 1862, 1864
- Bridge Committee 1862–1864, 1866
- Water Committee 1864
- Finance Committee 1866
- Brisbane Board of Waterworks 1874–1883

George was a Member of the Legislative Assembly (lower house) of Queensland representing the electorate of East Moreton from 7 May 1860 to 1 July 1867. He also represented the electorate of Town of Brisbane from 10 Feb 1869 to 14 Nov 1873 and then the electorate of Wickham from 18 Nov 1873 to 28 April 1877.

On 12 May 1877, George was made a life Member of the Legislative Council of Queensland until his death on 23 Feb 1883.

He made a substantial contribution to the early development of Brisbane. Amongst the initiatives that he championed were:

- Breakfast Creek Bridge
- Brisbane General Cemetery Trust, now known as the Toowong Cemetery (where he is buried near the front gates)
- A primary school in Spring Hill (today the Brisbane Central State School)
- Ann Street Presbyterian Church
- As mayor in 1863–64 he had much to do with the planning of the first Brisbane bridge (Victoria Bridge), the First Brisbane Town Hall and Brisbane Waterworks.

== See also ==
- List of mayors and lord mayors of Brisbane

Parliament of Queensland
New seat	Member for East Moreton; 1860 – 1867; Served alongside: Henry Buckley, Thomas Warry, William Brookes, Robert Cribb	Succeeded by Arthur Francis
Preceded by Theophilus Pugh	Member for Town of Brisbane; 1869 – 1873; Served alongside: Alexander Pritchard, Simon Fraser, Ratcliffe Pring, John Handy, Kevin O'Doherty	Abolished
New seat	Member for Wickham; 1873 – 1877	Succeeded by Albert John Hockings
