= Thomas Blacket Stephens =

Australian politician (1819–1877)

The Hon Thomas Blacket Stephens
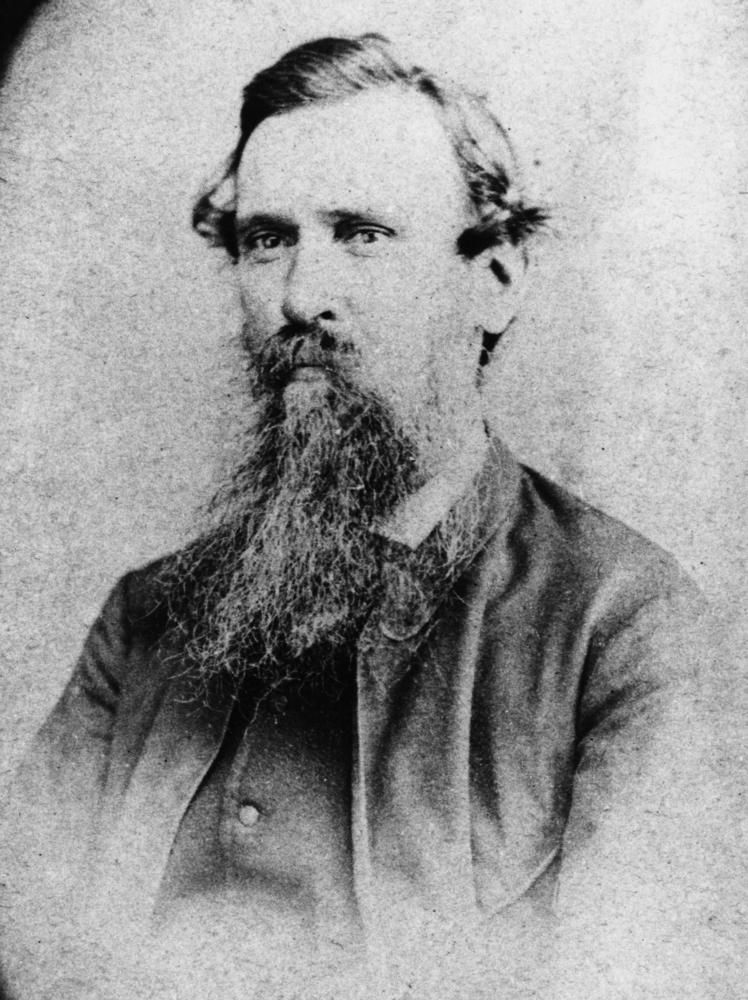

6th Treasurer of Queensland
- In office 21 May 1867 – 15 August 1867
- Preceded by: John Douglas
- Succeeded by: Robert Mackenzie
- Constituency: Town of South Brisbane
- In office 27 January 1869 – 3 May 1870
- Preceded by: Thomas Henry FitzGerald
- Succeeded by: Robert Ramsay
- Constituency: Town of South Brisbane

2nd Mayor of Brisbane
- In office 1862–1862
- Preceded by: John Petrie
- Succeeded by: George Edmondstone

Member of the Queensland Legislative Assembly for South Brisbane (Town of South Brisbane)
- In office 10 June 1863 – 13 May 1875
- Preceded by: Henry Richards
- Succeeded by: Richard Kingsford

Member of the Queensland Legislative Council
- In office 22 July 1876 – 26 August 1877

Personal details
- Born: 5 January 1819 Rochdale, Lancashire, England
- Died: 26 August 1877 (aged 58) Brisbane, Queensland
- Resting place: South Brisbane Cemetery
- Spouse: Anne Connah (m.1856 d.1904)
- Relations: William Stephens (son)
- Occupation: Fellmonger, Wool Broker, Newspaper proprietor

Thomas Blacket Stephens (5 January 1819 – 26 August 1877) was a wealthy Brisbane businessman and newspaper proprietor who also served as an alderman and mayor of Brisbane Municipal Council, a Member of the Legislative Assembly of Queensland and a Member of the Queensland Legislative Council.

== Personal life ==
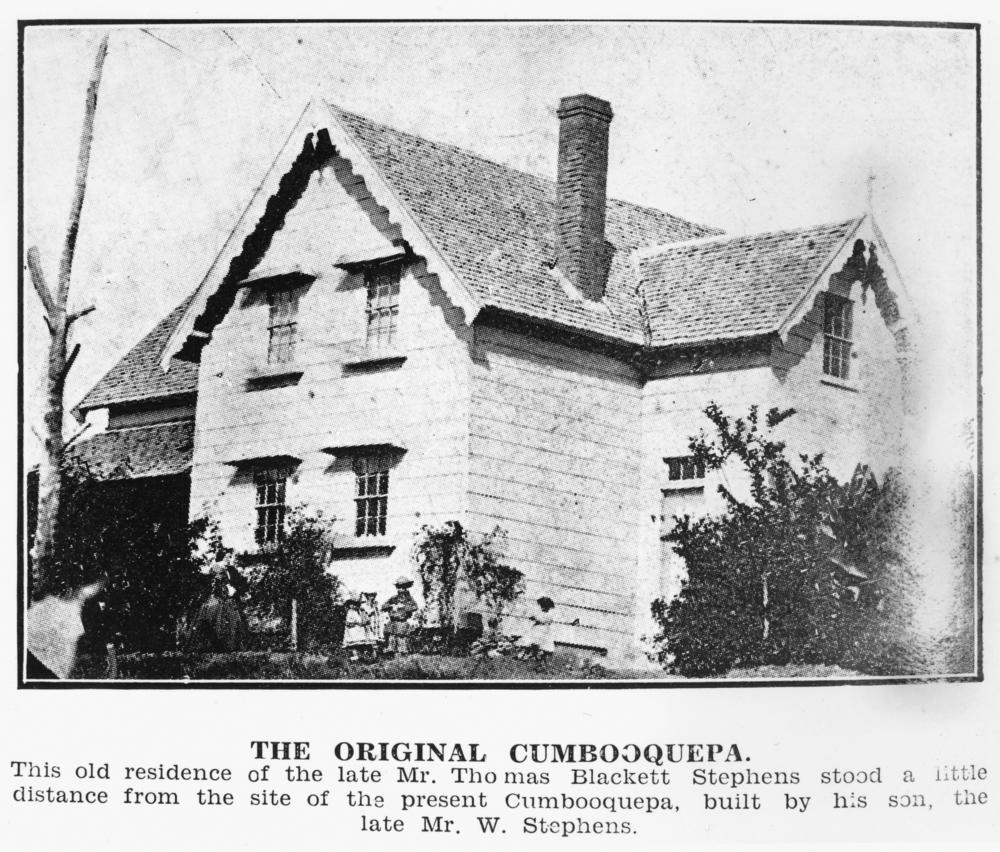
Thomas Blacket Stephens home, Cumbooqueepa, South Brisbane, Queensland, circa 1860

Thomas Blacket Stephens was born on 5 January 1819 at Rochdale, Lancashire, England, the son of Rev. William Stephens (a Baptist minister) and his wife Elizabeth (née Blacket).

On 6 September 1848 Thomas emigrated from Liverpool on the ship 'Bengal' arriving in Sydney, New South Wales on 12 February 1849. His cousin Edmund Blacket was the Colonial Architect in Sydney.

Thomas married Anne Connah in Balmain, Sydney at the home of his cousin, Edmund Blacket, in 1856.

The couple moved to Moreton Bay, now Brisbane and had 12 children in Brisbane (4 of whom died in infancy). Their children were:

- William (1857–1925), a Member of the Legislative Assembly of Queensland
- Emily (1860–1918)
- Marian (1862–1862)
- Elizabeth (1863–1940, Mrs Lang)
- Richard (1865–1865)
- Laura (1866–1952)
- Thomas Connah (1868–1937)
- Henry (1869–1870)
- Sophia (1870–1956, Mrs Robertson)
- Anne (1872–16 January 1872)
- Llewellyn (1873–1934)
- Stephen (1875–1958)

In 1860, Thomas erected a two-storey house in South Brisbane called 'Cumbooquepa' from the Aboriginal name for the waterholes on the land.

In November 1874, Thomas became seriously ill, possibly cholera acquired from a ship visiting from India. Although he recovered somewhat from his illness, he remained weak and in May 1875 retired from many of his duties and made his will.

Thomas died from congestion of the lungs, following some years of poor health following a serious illness in 1874, at his residence 'Cumbooquepa' on 26 August 1877 and was buried in South Brisbane Cemetery the following day.

In 1890, his widow Anne built a newer home 'Cumbooquepa' above Vulture Street on the property at South Brisbane. This house was later purchased in 1919 as the boarding school for the Brisbane girls' school Somerville House and is now heritage-listed. It is often stated that Thomas built or occupied this 'Cumbooquepa', but he is only associated with the earlier house.

Widow Anne died on 12 July 1904 at 'Cumbooquepa' and was buried with her husband in South Brisbane Cemetery.

== Business life ==
Stephens had a number of companies as well as interest in land development. His first business in Brisbane is believed to be a woolscour at Ormiston near Moreton Bay.

In 1856 he purchased land at Stones Corner near Ekibin Creek and established a woolscour. The following year (1857) he purchased some adjacent land at Annerley and established a fellmongery and tanning business in Essie Street.

Thomas purchased The Moreton Bay Courier sometime in late 1859 and he soon turned it into a daily newspaper, the Courier. In 1864 it became the Brisbane Courier. In June–July 1868, he floated the Brisbane Newspaper Company, and transferred the plant and copyright of the Brisbane Courier to it. He was the managing director until he retired in November 1873, when the paper was auctioned.

== Public service ==
Thomas was an alderman from 1859 to 1864 and was mayor in 1862 of the Brisbane Municipal Council. He served on a number of committees:

- Finance Committee 1860, 1861
- Improvement Committee 1860–1863
- Incorporation Committee 1862,1864
- Water Committee 1862–1864
- Bridge Committee 1862–1864
- Legislative Committee 1863, 1864
- Brisbane Board of Waterworks 1866–1877

From 10 June 1863 to 13 May 1875 Thomas was the elected Member of the Queensland Legislative Assembly (lower house) for the electorate of the Town of South Brisbane.

He held many senior positions in the government including"

- Colonial Treasurer: 21 May 1867 – 15 August 1867
- Secretary for Trade and Finance: 21 May 1867 -
- Colonial Secretary: 25 November 1868 – 28 January 1869
- Colonial Treasurer: 27 January 1869 – 3 May 1870
- Postmaster-General: 13 November 1869 – 28 January 1870
- Secretary for Public Lands: 8 January 1874 – 27 May 1875

In May 1875, he retired from public life due to an ongoing illness contracted in November 1874.

On 22 July 1876, he was appointed a life Member of the Legislative Council of Queensland (upper house) until his death on 26 August 1877.

Around 1864 to 1875 he served on the various education boards (Board of National Education, General Board of Education, Board of General Education), retiring due to his illness in May 1875.

He was also one of the first people on the board of trustees at Brisbane Grammar School.

He was a director of the South Brisbane Good Templars' Weekly Penny Savings Bank in 1874.

He was one of the original trustees of South Brisbane Cemetery and was buried there upon his death in 1877.

== See also ==
- List of mayors and lord mayors of Brisbane
- Members of the Queensland Legislative Assembly, 1863–1867; 1867–1868; 1868–1870; 1870–1871; 1871–1873; 1873–1878

Parliament of Queensland
Preceded by Henry Richards	Member for South Brisbane (Town of South Brisbane); 1863–1875	Succeeded by Richard Kingsford
