= John Killeen Handy =

Australian politician

John Handy

Member of the Queensland Legislative Assembly for Mitchell
- In office 18 June 1870 – 4 September 1871
- Preceded by: Archibald Buchanan
- Succeeded by: Boyd Dunlop Morehead

Member of the Queensland Legislative Assembly for Town of Brisbane
- In office 27 January 1872 – 14 November 1873 Serving with Kevin O'Doherty, George Edmondstone
- Preceded by: Ratcliffe Pring
- Succeeded by: Seat abolished

Personal details
- Born: John Killeen Handy; 1834 Westmeath, Ireland
- Died: 24 January 1874 (aged 39-40) Brisbane, Queensland, Australia
- Resting place: Toowong Cemetery
- Spouse: Isabella Curse Kendall (m.1863)
- Occupation: Catholic priest, Lawyer

John Killeen Handy (1834–1874) was a politician in Queensland, Australia. He was a Member of the Queensland Legislative Assembly.

He represented the electorate of Mitchell from June 1870 until September 1871. Then the electoral district of North Brisbane from Jan 1872 to Nov 1873.

== Early life ==
Born in Ireland in 1834, he then studied at Meath National school before performed tonsure and minor orders in Paris in 1855. After being ordained as a Roman Catholic priest on 28 March 1857, Handy travelled to San Francisco, California. He became the pastor at Placerville on 25 July 1859. He then became the pastor at Yreka, Crescent City. On 19 January 1861 Handy became the assistant pastor at St Mary's Cathedral, San Francisco. After this time his health began to fail so on 5 November 1861 he left San Francisco for Sydney on the Nimrod. On 1 February 1862 Handy was commissioned in the Diocese of Sydney. He was then appointed the priest of Patrick Plains, Tamworth. In January 1863 he left the church after a dispute and was subsequently excommunicated.

== Career in law and politics ==
Handy qualified as a lawyer through the University of Melbourne from 1863 to 1865. He arrived in Queensland in 1865 and was appointed the Crown Prosecutor. He also undertook work in private practice. Handy was a member of the Legislative Assembly of Queensland until shortly before his death on 24 January 1874 at the age of 40.

== Family life ==
John Killeen Handy married Isabella Agnes Carse Kendall on 12 February 1863 in Sydney.

Parliament of Queensland
Preceded by Archibald Buchanan	Member for Mitchell; 1870–1871	Succeeded by Boyd Dunlop Morehead
Preceded by Ratcliffe Pring	Member for Town of Brisbane; 1872–1873; Served alongside: Kevin O'Doherty, George Edmondstone	Abolished
