= George Raff =

Australian politician

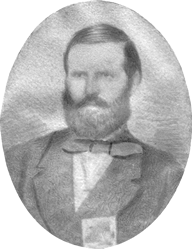

Member of the Queensland Legislative Assembly for Town Of Brisbane
- In office 11 May 1860 – 8 April 1864 Serving with Charles Blakeney, Henry Jordan, Robert Cribb, Theophilus Pugh
- Preceded by: New seat
- Succeeded by: William Brookes
- In office 23 November 1865 – 22 June 1867 Serving with William Brookes, Theophilus Pugh
- Preceded by: Charles Blakeney
- Succeeded by: Alexander Pritchard

Personal details
- Born: George Raff; 6 April 1815 Forres, Elginshire, Scotland
- Died: 28 August 1889 (aged 74) Brisbane, Queensland, Australia
- Resting place: Toowong Cemetery
- Spouse(s): Harriet Sealy (m. 1843 d. 1880), Eliza Jane Molle (m. 1883)
- Relations: Alexander Raff (brother)
- Occupation: Grazier

George Raff (15 April 1815—28 August 1889) was a merchant, sugar grower and politician born in Forres, Morayshire, Scotland who spent a substantial part of his life in Australia.

Born to James Raff, a farmer and peasant, and Margaret Raff, née Cumming, little is known about Raff's early years. He left for Sydney aboard the Earl Durham, and arrived on 2 January 1839. Soon after arriving, he found employment with Lamb, Parbury & Co., founded by John de Villiers Lamb and his brother. He remained there, with that employment, for several years, before, in 1842–1843, he held Tarwin station, Gippsland. Around that time, on 14 April 1843, Raff married Harriet Sealy, daughter of Robert Bourne, a retired missionary whom he knew and was associated with in Gippsland.

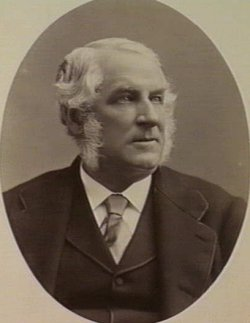
Sir George Bowen (seen here) offered to create a temporary committee with Sir Robert George Wyndham Herbert and Raff.

In January 1851, Raff returned to Australia, and then moved to Brisbane, Queensland. Soon thereafter he founded both the George Raff & Co., and, a short time later, the Queensland Mercantile and Agency Co. He worked with both of these companies for ten years, before he became director of the Queensland Steam Navigation Co. Because of his close involvement with these significant enterprises, Raff was the main substantiator of the wool trade between Brisbane and London.

At a plantation near Caboolture, he began to work with the growing and harvesting of sugar, among other crops, and became involved with commercial sugar production. He was also commended for his treatment of the Kanaka men he employed on the site by John Dunmore Lang.

Raff became politically involved in the separation movement. On 11 May 1860 he was elected to represent the Town of Brisbane in the first proper parliament, also in 1860 he became a part of the Board of National Education and of the Exhibition Commission. Following the resignation of Arthur Macalister as premier in July 1866, the government that he was a part of was under threat of becoming utterly dysfunctional. To keep the government alive, Sir George Bowen offered to create a temporary committee with Sir Robert George Wyndham Herbert and Raff, a move which was met with strong opposition. Raff continued to work in politics and parliament until 22 June 1867, when he resigned. While Raff was a political liberal, his strong opposition to extravagance in politics and in government rendered him suspect in several circles, but his good will and patriotism was never denied openly.

== Personal life ==
Raff lived a happy social life with his family (wife and seven sons) at his house in New Farm, until the death of his wife in 1880. Approximately four years later he married again, to Jane Molle, née Lord. Molle was a widow and she had children of her own. This led to Raff's effective estrangement from his sons.

Raff died on 28 August 1889 and was buried in Toowong Cemetery. He was survived by his seven sons and left an estate valued for probate at £5038.

== Notes ==
Parliament of Queensland
New seat	Member for Town Of Brisbane; 1860–1864; Served alongside: Charles Blakeney, Henry Jordan, Robert Cribb, Theophilus Pugh	Succeeded by William Brooke
Preceded by Charles Blakeney	Member for Town Of Brisbane; 1865–1867; Served alongside: William Brookes, Theophilus Pugh	Succeeded by Alexander Pritchard
