= Henry Jordan (politician) =

Australian politician

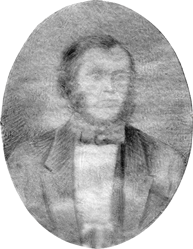

Member of the Queensland Legislative Assembly for Town Of Brisbane
- In office 11 May 1860 – 17 October 1860 Serving with Charles Blakeney, George Raff
- Preceded by: New seat
- Succeeded by: Robert Cribb

Member of the Queensland Legislative Assembly for East Moreton
- In office 23 December 1868 – 20 October 1871 Serving with Arthur Francis, Robert Atkin
- Preceded by: John Douglas
- Succeeded by: William Hemmant

Member of the Queensland Legislative Assembly for South Brisbane (Brisbane South)
- In office 21 August 1883 – 30 June 1890
- Preceded by: Simon Fraser
- Succeeded by: Abraham Luya

Personal details
- Born: Henry Jordan; 19 November 1818 Lincoln, England
- Died: 30 June 1890 (aged 71) Brisbane, Australia
- Resting place: Sherwood Anglican Churchyard
- Spouse: Sarah Elizabeth Hopkins Turner
- Relations: John Sargent Turner (brother-in-law)
- Occupation: Dentist

Henry Jordan (19 November 1818 – 30 June 1890) was a dentist and member of the Legislative Assembly of Queensland, Secretary for Public Lands 1887 to 1888.

Jordan was born in Lincoln, Lincolnshire, England, the son of John Jordan, a Wesleyan minister from Devonshire stock, and his wife Elizabeth, née Jeffries.

Jordan was educated by his father, entered Kingsford College, Bristol, and then studied at London Institution for Diseases of the Teeth. Jordan built up a lucrative dental practice in Derby. He published Practical observations on the Teeth (London, 1851) which ran to two editions and was highly praised in England and America; it later won him election to the Odontological Society of Great Britain.

In February 1856 Jordan arrived in Queensland and in 1859 he married Sarah Elizabeth Hopkins Turner. Jordan was a member of the first Board of Education in Queensland, and represented the Town of Brisbane in the first session of the first Parliament. From January 1861 to December 1866 he was in London as Commissioner and Agent-General for Immigration, and from 23 December 1868 to 20 October 1871 he sat in the Assembly as member for East Moreton. In 1875, he was appointed Registrar-General, which office he held until 1883. He was elected to the Assembly for South Brisbane on 21 August 1883. In August 1887 he succeeded Charles Dutton as Secretary for Public Lands, and went out of office with his colleagues in June 1888. At the general election on 12 May 1888 he was re-elected for South Brisbane. Jordan died on 30 June 1890 at his home, Sherwood, survived by his wife, four sons and three daughters (four other children predeceased him). Jordan was buried in the Sherwood Anglican Churchyard in Brisbane.

A park along the Logan River in Waterford West, Logan City is named after Jordan. His daughter, May Jordan McConnel, was a notable trade unionist and suffragist.

Parliament of Queensland
| New seat | Member for Town Of Brisbane; 1860; Served alongside: Charles Blakeney, George Raff | Succeeded by Robert Cribb |
| Preceded by John Douglas | Member for East Moreton; 1868–1871; Served alongside: Arthur Francis, Robert Atkin | Succeeded by William Hemmant |
| Preceded by Simon Fraser | Member for South Brisbane (Brisbane South); 1883-1890 | Succeeded by Abraham Luya |
