= Ratcliffe Pring =

Australian politician

The Hon Ratcliffe Pring QC
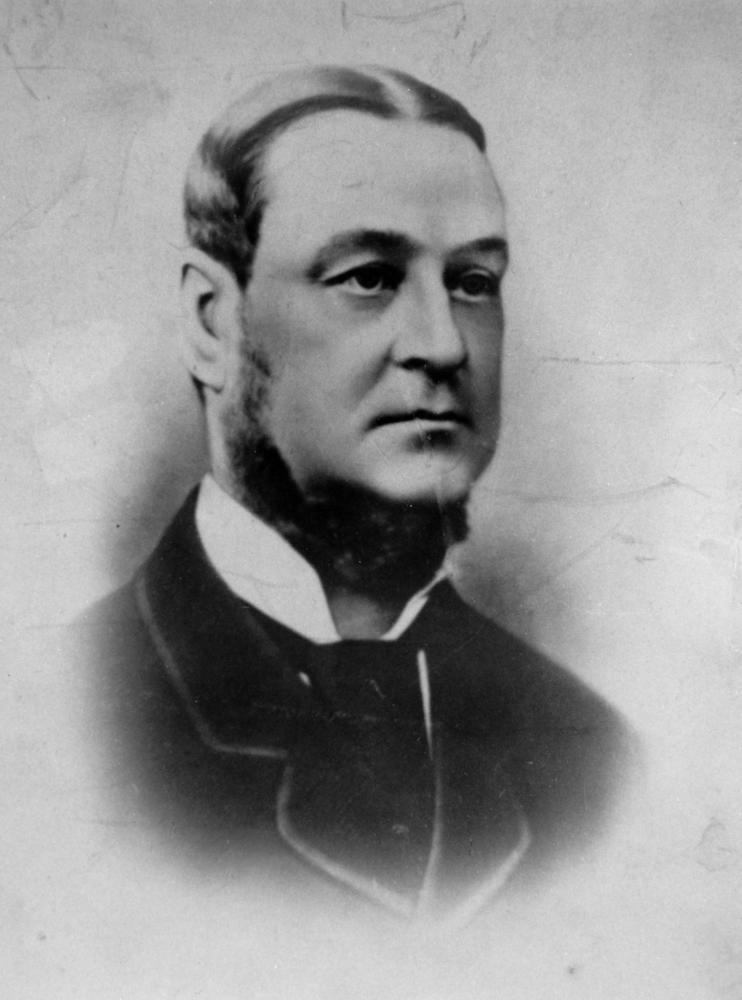

1st Attorney-General of Queensland
- In office 12 December 1859 – 30 August 1865
- Premier: Robert Herbert; Arthur Macalister
- Governor: George Bowen
- Succeeded by: John Bramston
- In office 21 July 1866 – 7 August 1866
- Premier: Robert Herbert
- Governor: George Bowen
- Preceded by: Charles Lilley
- Succeeded by: Charles Lilley
- In office 15 August 1867 – 25 November 1868
- Premier: Robert Mackenzie
- Governor: George Bowen; Samuel Blackall
- Preceded by: Charles Lilley
- Succeeded by: Charles Lilley
- In office 12 November 1869 – 3 May 1870
- Premier: Charles Lilley
- Governor: Samuel Blackall
- Preceded by: Charles Lilley
- Succeeded by: John Bramston
- In office 2 January 1874 – 8 January 1874
- Premier: Arthur Macalister
- Governor: George Phipps
- Preceded by: John Bramston
- Succeeded by: Edward MacDevitt
- In office 16 May 1879 – 4 June 1880
- Premier: Thomas McIlwraith
- Governor: Arthur Kennedy
- Preceded by: John Malbon Thompson
- Succeeded by: Henry Beor
Constituencies
Member of the Queensland Legislative Assembly for Eastern Downs
In office 27 April 1860 – 22 April 1862
Preceded by	New seat
Succeeded by	John Donald McLean
Member of the Queensland Legislative Assembly for Town of Ipswich
In office 30 May 1863 – 4 August 1866 Serving with Henry Challinor, Arthur Macalister
Preceded by	Frederick Forbes
Succeeded by	George Reed
Member of the Queensland Legislative Assembly for Burnett
In office 22 April 1867 – 17 August 1870 Serving with Robert Mackenzie, Charles Haly
Preceded by	Charles Robert Haly
Succeeded by	Berkeley Moreton
Member of the Queensland Legislative Assembly for Town of Brisbane
In office 17 August 1870 – 11 January 1872 Serving with Kevin O'Doherty, George Edmondstone
Preceded by	Simon Fraser
Succeeded by	John Handy
Member of the Queensland Legislative Assembly for Carnarvon
In office 25 November 1873 – 2 January 1874
Preceded by	New seat
Succeeded by	William Miles
Member of the Queensland Legislative Assembly for Brisbane City
In office 12 February 1878 – 15 November 1878
Preceded by	Simon Fraser
Succeeded by	Seat abolished
Member of the Queensland Legislative Assembly for Fortitude Valley
In office 26 November 1878 – 28 May 1879
Preceded by	Francis Beattie
Succeeded by	Francis Beattie
Member of the Queensland Legislative Council
In office 24 April 1862 – 26 May 1863

Personal details
- Born: 17 October 1825 Crediton, Devon, England
- Died: 26 March 1885 (aged 59) Brisbane, Queensland
- Resting place: Toowong Cemetery
- Spouse: Frances Pye
- Education: Shrewsbury School
- Occupation: Barrister, Judge

His Honour the Honourable Ratcliffe Pring (17 October 1825 – 26 March 1885) was a lawyer, politician and the first Attorney-General in colonial Queensland.

== Early life ==
Pring was born on 17 October 1825 at Crediton, Devon, England, the second son of Thomas E. Pring, solicitor. He was educated at Shrewsbury School, and entered at the Inner Temple in November 1845, being called to the Bar in June 1849.

Pring suffered from bronchitis which motivated him to immigrate to Australia, arriving in Sydney in 1853. He practised as a barrister on the Moreton Bay, Bathurst and Goulburn court circuits of New South Wales with much success.

In 1857 a Northern Supreme Court for New South Wales was established in Brisbane. Pring was appointed as its Crown Prosecutor and a Queen's Counsel by Sir William Montagu Manning, the Solicitor-General for New South Wales. Pring took up residence in Brisbane in April 1857, when the court opened.

== Political life ==
On 27 March 1860 Pring was elected to the first Legislative Assembly of Queensland for the district of Eastern Downs, and served under (later Sir) Robert Herbert as Attorney-General in the first Ministry formed under responsible government from December 1859 to August 1865. In the second Herbert Ministry he filled the same office from July to August 1866. He was also Attorney-General in the Robert Mackenzie Ministry from August 1867 to November 1868; in the Charles Lilley Government from November 1869 to May 1870; and in the first Thomas McIlwraith Administration from May 1879 to June 1880, when he accepted a puisne judgeship of the Supreme Court of Queensland.

Pring served as member of the Queensland Legislative Council from 24 April 1862 to 26 May 1863. He also served in the Assembly for Ipswich from 30 May 1863 to 4 August 1866; for Burnett from 22 April 1867 to 17 August 1870.

He was elected in Town of Brisbane on 17 August 1870. He contributed to many acrimonious debates in 1871, which culminated in January 1871 in physical violence. On 10 January 1871, Pring repeatedly interrupted the member for Clermont, Oscar de Satge. Clark (member for Warwick) complained about Pring's "extremely offensive and personal remarks in regard to the Member for Clermont" and proceeded to make insulting remarks about Pring. Pring called on the Speaker (Arthur Macalister) to rebuke Clark, which he did. Pring then proposed that Clark exit parliament for five minutes to "settle all things", which the Speaker declared to be out of order. Pring responded by calling Clark "the dirty wretch". The Speaker told Pring not to continue this behaviour. Pring then threatened to kick Clark, by which time the Legislative Assembly was in an uproar with the Speaker unable to restore order. Clark and Pring continued to trade insults. Pring then rose as if to leave the Assembly, but, as he walked past Clark, he attacked Clark by grabbing his collar with one hand and tugged at Clark's beard with the other hand, yelling "Come outside and we will settle it". The Sergeant-at-Arms went to Pring saying "I take you in charge". Pring responded "Do you? You will have to catch me first!" and then raced out of the chamber, and the Sergeant-at-Arms was unable to catch him. The Speaker then issued a warrant for Pring's arrest for his contempt of Parliament (the first time this had occurred in the Queensland Parliament), but did not sign it in order to allow Pring to end the matter by apologising, calling on Pring to attend the House on 16 January. However, Pring did not apologise but resigned the following day (11 January), evidently believing that would bring the matter to an end. However, on 22 January, the Speaker, in the absence of an apology from Pring, proceeded with the warrant and Pring was arrested in Dalby where Pring had gone on Court business. However, the police did not know what action to take after arresting Pring as he could not be delivered to the Parliament which was now in recess, so they ended up releasing him. Pring returned to Brisbane triumphant, where he addressed a crowd of sympathisers from the balcony of the Australian Hotel in Albert Street, promising that he would return to Parliament.

He was elected in Carnarvon from 25 November 1873 to 2 January 1874.

Following the retirement of Thomas Blacket Stephens due to illness, in May 1875 Pring stood for election for the South Brisbane seat in the Queensland Legislative Assembly, but was defeated by Richard Ash Kingsford.

However, Pring was later elected in Brisbane City from 12 February 1878 to 15 November 1878 and for Fortitude Valley from 26 November 1878 to 28 May 1879.

In 1863 Pring was offered the position of first Chief Justice of Queensland, over the head of the Judge Alfred Lutwyche, but declined the post, and Sir James Cockle was appointed.

== Later life ==
Pring died at his residence in Brisbane on Thursday 26 March 1885, after a 14-month illness, of cardiac asthma. He was buried in Toowong Cemetery. He left his wife almost destitute.

== Miscellaneous ==
Ratcliffe Pring was a tenant of the now heritage-listed Newstead House in Brisbane.

Parliament of Queensland
New seat	Member for Eastern Downs; 1860 – 1862	Succeeded by John Donald McLean
Preceded by Frederick Forbes	Member for Town of Ipswich; 1863 – 1866; Served alongside: Henry Challinor, Arthur Macalister	Succeeded by George Reed
Preceded by Charles Robert Haly	Member for Burnett; 1867 – 1870; Served alongside: Robert Mackenzie, Charles Haly	Succeeded by Berkeley Moreton
Preceded by Simon Fraser	Member for Town of Brisbane; 1870 – 1872; Served alongside: Kevin O'Doherty, George Edmondstone	Succeeded by John Handy
New seat	Member for Carnarvon; 1873 – 1874	Succeeded by William Miles
Preceded by Robert Stewart	Member for Brisbane City; 1878	Abolished
Preceded by Francis Beattie	Member for Fortitude Valley; 1878 – 1879	Succeeded by Francis Beattie
