= John Sargent Turner =

Australian politician

The Hon John Turner

Member of the Queensland Legislative Council
- In office 18 April 1878 – 29 July 1900

Personal details
- Born: John Sargent Turner; 3 December 1826 Whangaroa, New Zealand
- Died: 29 July 1900 (aged 73) Brisbane, Queensland, Australia
- Resting place: Toowong Cemetery
- Spouse: Adelaide Mary Jane Ball (m.1855 d.1887)
- Relations: William Graham (brother-in-law), Henry Jordan (brother-in-law)
- Occupation: Company director

John Sargent Turner (3 December 1826 – 29 July 1900) was a member of the Queensland Legislative Council.

Turner was born in Whangaroa, New Zealand in 1826 to Nathaniel Turner, a Wesleyan missionary, and his wife Anne (née Sargent) and educated in New Zealand and Van Diemen's Land.

He was appointed to the Queensland Legislative Council in April 1878, serving until his death in July 1900.

In 1861, Turner married Adelaide Mary Jane Ball and together they had three sons. He died in 1900 and was buried in Toowong Cemetery. Turner was survived by two sons, Major Leonard Haslewood Turner, and Leslie Mountford Turner. He was also survived by two sisters, Louisa Elizabeth Graham, the wife of William Graham, and Sarah Elizabeth Jordan, the wife of Henry Jordan.
