= Fred Warry =

Australian rules footballer

Personal information
- Full name: Frederick Palmer Warry
- Born: 4 December 1880; Seychelles
- Died: 4 February 1959 (aged 78); Mont Albert, Victoria
- Original team: Melbourne Grammar School

Playing career^{1}
| Years | Club | Games (Goals) |
| 1900 | St Kilda | 2 (0) |
- ^{1} Playing statistics correct to the end of 1900.

Frederick Palmer Warry (4 December 1880 – 4 February 1959) was an Australian rules footballer who played with St Kilda in the Victorian Football League (VFL).
