= Richard Warry =

Australian politician

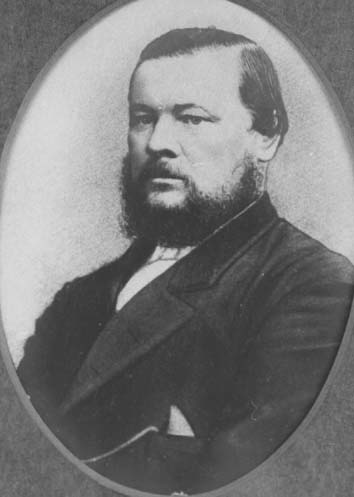

6th Mayor of Brisbane
- In office 1866–1866
- Preceded by: Albert Hockings
- Succeeded by: Albert Hockings

Personal details
- Born: Richard Symes Warry; 1829 England
- Died: 12 March 1891 (aged 62) Enoggera, Queensland, Australia
- Resting place: Toowong Cemetery
- Spouse: Mary Lydia Pratten (m.1851 d.1929)
- Occupation: Shopkeeper

Richard Symes Warry was an alderman and mayor of Brisbane, Queensland, Australia.

== Personal life ==
Richard Symes Warry was born about 1829 in England, son of Thomas Warry and Maria Symes. He was the brother of Thomas Symes Warry, a Member of the Queensland Legislative Assembly.

On 25 January 1851 in Brisbane, Richard Symes Warry married Mary Lydia Pratten, daughter of Job Pratten and Ann Love. They had a large family of children, but as was common at that time, a number of the children died young:

- Maria Ann, born Brisbane 1852
- Thomas Symes, born Brisbane 1854, played for the Maryborough cricket team
- Richard Symes, born Brisbane 1857, played for the Queensland cricket team
- Sarah Love, born Brisbane 1860
- Lydia, born Brisbane 1862
- Susan Elizabeth, born Brisbane 1863, died Brisbane 1864
- George Love, born Brisbane 1865, died Brisbane 1913
- Ada Frances, born Brisbane 1867, died Brisbane 1918
- Alice Maude, born Queensland 1868
- Mary, born Queensland 1871, died Brisbane 1876
- Minnie Gertrude, born Queensland 1873
- Edith May/Mary, born and died Brisbane 1874
- Frank Symes, born and died Brisbane 1876
- Clara Rose, born Brisbane 1877

Richard Symes Warry died 12 March 1891 at his residence Timsbury, Bamford Road, Enoggera, Queensland aged 62 years. His wife Mary died in Brisbane in 1929. They are buried in Toowong Cemetery, together with other family members

== Business life ==
Richard Symes Warry was a grocer. He was one of the earliest of the Queen Street storekeepers, having had a shop for many years on the eastern side near the corner with Albert Street. Later he had a shop opposite the General Post Office.

== Public life ==
Richard Symes Warry was an alderman of the Brisbane Municipal Council in 1862–1863 and 1865–1866. He was mayor in 1866. He took a break from public life for a number of years and then returned as alderman of the West Ward from 1883 to 1888 before finally retiring.

He served on the following committees:

- Finance Committee 1862, 1863, 1885, 1887
- Water Committee 1862–1863
- Lighting Committee 1863, 1866
- Legislative Committee

== See also ==
- List of mayors and lord mayors of Brisbane
