= Theophilus Parsons Pugh =

Australian politician

- Brisbane about 1870

Member of the Queensland Legislative Assembly for Town Of Brisbane
- In office 30 May 1863 – 30 January 1869 Serving with Charles Blakeney, George Raff, Alexander Pritchard, Simon Fraser, William Brookes, Kevin O'Doherty
- Preceded by: Robert Cribb
- Succeeded by: George Edmondstone

Theophilus Parsons Pugh
- Born: 6 November 1831; Turk's Island, Caicos Group, British West Indies
- Died: 14 March 1896 (aged 64)
- Other names: 'Meeanchin' (pen-name, the Aboriginal name of the Brisbane River being 'Meeannjin', he used this to sign his articles in the Courier and other journals in the mid to late 1860s)
- Occupations: Public servant, journalist, newspaper editor, almanac editor and proprietor, government printer, politician, pioneer of compassion (humanitarian)
- Employer(s): Moreton Bay Free Press, Moreton Bay Courier, Brisbane Courier.
- Spouse(s): 1st 1855 Annie Thompson Trundle; 2nd 1867 Jane Montgomery
- Children: six in the second marriage

Theophilus Parsons Pugh (1831–1896) was an Australian journalist, newspaper editor, politician, publisher and public servant, as well as the editor-in-chief of the Moreton Bay Courier, which he in 1861 renamed to The Courier, renamed again in 1864 to the Brisbane Courier.

== Early life ==
Pugh was born on Turk's Island (Caicos group), part of the British West Indies as son of a Wesleyan minister. Pugh came to Brisbane from London in 1855.

== Journalist and publisher ==
Pugh is well known in Queensland history honoured as the a journalist and public servant and as the publisher of the still frequently used Pugh's Almanac of Queensland. Yet the conspiracy of silence on all matters dealing with Aboriginal rights meant that Pugh was never credited for his editorial campaign in the Brisbane Courier for Aboriginal rights and against Queensland's infamous frontier force the Native Police Force in the years 1860 to 1861. Pugh's biographers mentions his contribution as a political journalist and as publisher of Pugh's Almanac and critical stands in regards to the kanaka trade but not one word about his crucial role in connection to the editorial campaign against the native police in 1860–61 and the Select Committee of 1861. He was also the first publisher of the Queensland Government Gazette from 1861 to 1863.

At his death in 1896 the Brisbane Courier wrote:

"Pugh had filled numerous important positions. In the Southern portion of the colony, and at the time of his death was Police Magistrate at Nanango. He had attained the age of 65 years. Mr. Pugh was born at Turk's Island (Caicos group) in 1831. After being educated at Old Kingswood School, near Bristol, and at Wesley College, Taunton, he served a short apprenticeship as a printer, and then joined the "Southern Times" at Weymouth. Subsequently, he was connected with the "Mirror" at Salisbury, and the "Herald" at Swansea. Emigrating to Australia, he arrived at Moreton Bay in June 1855. Continuing his Press career, he for a time acted as correspondent to the Empire of Sydney. He became editor of the Moreton Bay Free Press in 1855, and occupied the editorial chair of that newspaper for four years, in 1859 he was appointed editor of the "Moreton Bay Courier," then a bi-weekly publication, which was shortly afterwards published three times a week, and daily from May 1861. After leaving what is now the "Brisbane Courier" in 1863, Mr. Pugh was identified with various journalistic ventures, and when the Brisbane "Telegraph" was started in 1872, Mr. Pugh was its first editor, a position which he retained for slightly over a year. "Pugh's Moreton Bay Almanac" appeared in sheet form at the close of 1857, and in book size the following year. In 1860 the scope of the almanac – or, rather, directory – was enlarged, and came out as "Pugh's Queensland Almanac," and its publication has been continued yearly ever since by various publishers. Mr. Pugh was closely identified with the movement for obtaining the separation of Queensland from New South Wales, and from 1857 to 1859 acted as secretary of the committee. Until the appointment of a Government printer, he was the publisher of the Government Gazette.In 1863 he was elected to represent the Town of Brisbane in the second Parliament of Queensland. He was re-elected in 1867, and became Chairman of Committees. An election taking place in the following year, Mr. Pugh again secured the confidence of the electors, but almost immediately, thereafter he retired from Parliamentary life. Mr. Pugh entered the civil service, and was appointed Police Magistrate at Goondiwindi in 1874. He afterwards filled similar positions at Rockhampton, Warwick, Bundaberg, and Beenleigh, and latterly at Nanango, Mr. Pugh, at the time of his death, was a patient in a private hospital at Toowoomba. He underwent an operation on the 7th instant, and never recovered from its effects; gradually sinking until he died on Saturday evening last."

== Later life ==
Pugh died in Toowoomba ad was buried in Drayton and Toowoomba Cemetery.

== Sources ==
- Ørsted-Jensen: Robert: The Right To Live – The Politics of Race and the Troubled Conscience of an Australian Journalist Vol I (yet unpublished manuscript) chapter 3

Parliament of Queensland
Preceded by Robert Cribb	Member for Town Of Brisbane; 1863–1869; Served alongside: Charles Blakeney, George Raff, Alexander Pritchard, Simon Fraser, William Brookes, Kevin O'Doherty	Succeeded by George Edmondstone
