= Arthur Francis (politician) =

Australian politician

Arthur Morley Francis
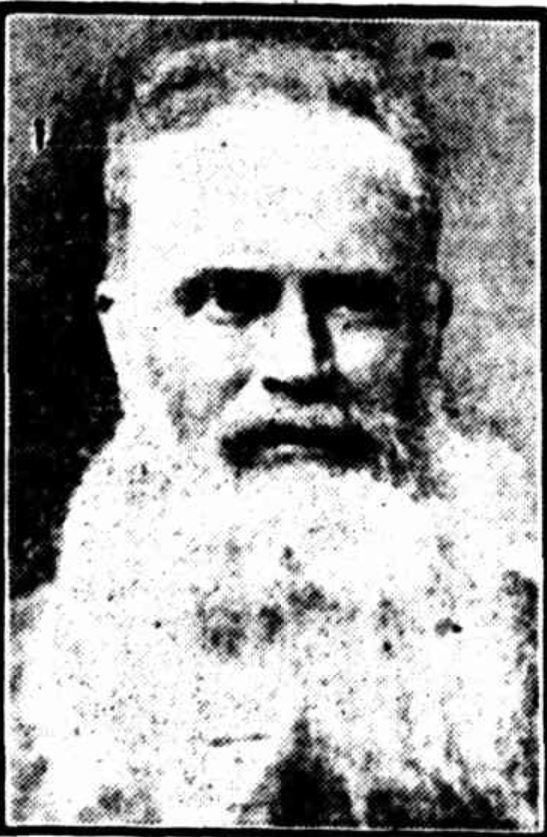
- Arthur Morley Francis

Member of the Queensland Legislative Assembly for East Moreton
- In office 1 July 1867 – 17 February 1870 Serving with James Garrick, John Douglas, Henry Jordan
- Preceded by: George Edmondstone
- Succeeded by: Robert Atkin

Personal details
- Born: Arthur Morley Francis; 1828 Churchover, Warwickshire, England
- Died: 11 May 1902 (aged 73-74) Sherwood, Queensland, Australia
- Resting place: Francis Lookout
- Spouse: Angela Powell
- Occupation: Journalist, Police magistrate

Arthur Morley Francis (1828 – 11 May 1902) was a politician in Queensland, Australia. He was a Member of the Queensland Legislative Assembly.

== Immigration to Queensland ==
Arthur Morley Francis, his wife Angela and children Richard (Dick) and new born Clement, arrived in Moreton Bay Brisbane on the sailing clipper, Saldanha, with a full passenger list of 500 in February 1862. He was noted on shipboard as an elocutionist. On Sundays he conducted Divine service, which was much appreciated by the immigrants.

== Farming ==
Francis selected 70 acres (28 ha) of land at Oxley West in the area now known as Corinda, 22.5 kilometres (14.0 mi) from Brisbane via the Brisbane River or 13 kilometres (8.1 mi) directly by land. This area was bordered by the Brisbane River and Oxley Creek and to make the land journey, residents had to cross one of these two waterways by boat and travel by horse or foot to Brisbane otherwise row or sail a boat to either Brisbane or Ipswich.

Francis decided to grow cotton as it was a profitable crop, due to the American Civil War raging at the time restricting the supply of cotton to the English mills. After the government chose to remove subsidies after the Civil War, this venture proved to be unprofitable. He, like most settlers in the area turned their efforts to growing sugar cane. Francis also invested in building a small sugar mill. This venture also came to be unprofitable when successive seasons of frost wiped out the crops. Francis was an educated man but lacked the skills of a farmer. He then chose to open a boarding school for settler's children to attend but this failed also.

Francis was a member of the Church of England. Initially he conducted religious services in his home in the mornings where he acquired a congregation and a fellow immigrant and landholder William Gray conducted evening services in his home. Arthur was the main protagonist in establishing a church in the district and finally an Anglican church, St Matthew's, was erected on what is now known as the Sherwood - Rocklea Road where the Sherwood (Anglican) Cemetery now stands. After a fire in the last church on the site, the new church was re-established on the present site of Oxley and Sherwood Roads.

== Politics ==
Francis was elected to the seat of East Moreton in the Queensland Legislative Assembly and held the seat from 1 July 1867 to 17 February 1870.

Arthur was an advocate of the scheme to contract Kanaka labour on Queensland farms. He was unaware of the corrupt nature this scheme had become and sought public submissions on what was occurring to rectify the injustices of the scheme. A rare voice, he opposed the introduction of the draconian Contagious Diseases Act in 1868, which allowed any woman, all woman to be searched if suspected of venereal disease.

In February 1870, Arthur declared himself bankrupt, mainly due to this investment in his sugar mill and what he owed to his workforce which at one time employed 15 white and 10 Kanaka workers. This action of bankruptcy forced Arthur to resign his position in Parliament.

== Journalism ==
After settling the conditions of his bankruptcy, Arthur in 1870 then chose employment as a Leader Writer for the Brisbane ‘Courier’ being the premier daily newspaper at the time. The family went to live at Albion on the northside of the Brisbane River, being closer to Brisbane and Arthur's employment.

At the end of 1873 Arthur build a house for the family at Corinda, being the name later on given to the part of the Oxley district in which the Francis family originally settled. It is thought that the house was built adjacent or on the Francis Lookout property. The building of the house was done by a local carpenter John Dudley Dunlop. About 1874–75 he was appointed to the position of Editor of the ‘Telegraph’, a newly formed evening newspaper, for which he held the position for 1 year.

== Public servant ==
In 1876 Arthur was appointed Police Magistrate at Banana township in the Dawson district, 160 klms approximately south-west of Gladstone. As a result of this appointment, the family split with his two sons, Richard (Dick) and Alexander, studying at the Brisbane Grammar School remaining in the Corinda district and his wife and daughter Charlotte, accompanying Arthur. Arthur had a string of appointments as Police Magistrate in various frontier towns being in 1878, at Taroom, 1879 at Thargomingah, February 1881 at Goondiwindi, July 1884 at Pine Hill, March 1889 at Southport and finally 1895 at Cunnamulla. Angela Francis is remembered for her work in getting trained nurses into bush townships.

== Return to politics ==
In March 1896, Arthur again nominated for election to the seat of Moreton in the Queensland Parliament but loses the election with only 42% of the vote. In 1898 in a newspaper article he declared his support for Women's Suffrage, probably inspired from the difficulties his wife had in convincing those in power at the time to back her worthy initiatives in improving conditions in the colony. She was a member of the Women's Franchise League. In 1898 on a visit to England, he arranged 20 lectures around the country to acquaint those listening on the benefits of immigrating to Queensland.

In 1899 he again contested the seat of Moreton outlining his policy in The Worker in 18 Feb 1899. He advocated greater emphasis on immigration to Queensland as well as a better education system but he failed to win the seat.

== Later life ==
Arthur was acquainted with the explorer William Landsborough.

Arthur Morley Francis died on 11 May 1902 at his residence in Sherwood, aged 74 years 11 months after a long illness. Angela Francis died in 1910.

Parliament of Queensland
Preceded by George Edmondstone	Member for East Moreton; 1867–1870; Served alongside: James Garrick, John Douglas, Henry Jordan	Succeeded by Robert Atkin
