= Alexander Pritchard =

Australian politician

Member of the Queensland Legislative Assembly for Town Of Brisbane
- In office 22 June 1867 – 26 September 1868 Serving with Kevin O'Doherty, Theophilus Pugh
- Preceded by: George Raff
- Succeeded by: Simon Fraser

Personal details
- Born: Alexander Bradford Pritchard; 1831
- Died: 3 December 1898 (aged 67)
- Occupation: Mercantile business

Alexander Brown Pritchard was a politician in Queensland, Australia. He was a member of the Queensland Legislative Assembly. He was elected into that position in 1867 and died in 1898.

Parliament of Queensland
Preceded by George Raff	Member for Town Of Brisbane; 1867–1868; Served alongside: Kevin O'Doherty, Theophilus Pugh	Succeeded by Simon Fraser
