= Electoral district of East Moreton (Queensland) =

East Moreton Queensland—Legislative Assembly
- State: Queensland
- Created: 1860
- Abolished: 1878
- Namesake: Moreton Bay

East Moreton was an electoral district of the Legislative Assembly in the Australian state of Queensland from 1860 to 1878, also known as Moreton from 1874 to 1878.

The district took in the south-east corner of the state, south of Brisbane and Ipswich. It was a dual member electorate from 1860 to 1873 and a single member electorate from 1873 to 1878.

== Members ==
Dual member electorate (1860–1873)
Member 1	Party	Term	Member 2	Party	Term
George Edmondstone	Unaligned	1860–1867	Henry Buckley	Unaligned	1860–1860
George Edmondstone	Unaligned	1860–1867	Thomas Warry	Unaligned	1860–1863
George Edmondstone	Unaligned	1860–1867	William Brookes	Unaligned	1863–1863
George Edmondstone	Unaligned	1860–1867	Robert Cribb	Unaligned	1863–1867
Arthur Francis	Unaligned	1867–1870	James Garrick	Unaligned	1867–1868
Arthur Francis	Unaligned	1867–1870	John Douglas	Unaligned	1868–1868
Arthur Francis	Unaligned	1867–1870	Henry Jordan	Unaligned	1868–1871
Robert Travers Atkin	Unaligned	1870–1872	Henry Jordan	Unaligned	1868–1871
Robert Travers Atkin	Unaligned	1870–1872	William Hemmant	Unaligned	1871–1873
Samuel Griffith	Unaligned	1872–1873	William Hemmant	Unaligned	1871–1873
William Fryar	Unaligned	1873–1877	Single member electorate		
James Garrick	Unaligned	1877–1878	(1873–1878)		

== By-election in February 1870 ==
On 17 February 1870, Arthur Francis, member for East Moreton, resigned due to insolvency, and a by-election was called. On the nomination day, 19 February 1870, there were two candidates Robert Travers Atkin and Robert Cribb (who had previously represented the electorate from 1863 to 1867). In his nomination speech, Atkin made accusations against Cribb, who replied vigorously defending himself. The somewhat unexpected outcome of this verbal exchange was that Cribb announced he would withdraw his nomination. Cribb said that if Atkin believed he could represent them so well, the best thing they could do would be to let him try, predicting that Atkin would either resign or be asked to resign within six months. Being the only remaining candidate, Atkin was declared elected.

Cribb's six-month prediction did not come true. However, Atkin did not complete his term, as he resigned on 7 March 1872 due to serious ill health (pulmonary tuberculosis) from which he died a few months later on."The Queenslander. SATURDAY, MARCH 9, 1872". The Queenslander. Queensland, Australia. 9 March 1872. p. 4 – via Trove.

== See also ==
- Electoral districts of Queensland
- Members of the Queensland Legislative Assembly by year
- Category:Members of the Queensland Legislative Assembly by name
