= Kevin Izod O'Doherty =

Irish-Australian politician (1823-1905)

The Hon Dr Kevin O'Doherty
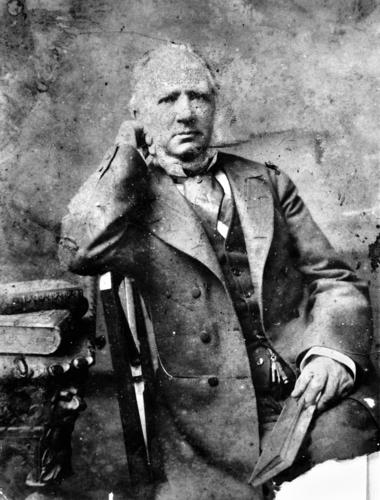

Member of the Queensland Legislative Assembly for Town of Brisbane
- In office 22 June 1867 – 14 November 1873 Serving with Alexander Pritchard, Simon Fraser, Ratcliffe Pring, John Killeen Handy, Theophilus Pugh, George Edmondstone
- Preceded by: William Brookes
- Succeeded by: Seat abolished

Member of the Queensland Legislative Council
- In office 12 May 1877 – 4 November 1885

Member of the British House of the Commons for North Meath
- In office 27 November 1885 – 7 July 1886
- Preceded by: New seat
- Succeeded by: Pierce Mahony

Personal details
- Born: Kevin Izod O'Doherty; 7 September 1823 Dublin, Ireland
- Died: 15 July 1905 (aged 81) Brisbane, Australia
- Resting place: Toowong Cemetery
- Spouse: Mary Anne Kelly (m.1855 d.1910)
- Education: Royal College of Surgeons in Ireland
- Occupation: Surgeon, Journalist
- Known for: The Irish Patriot

Kevin Izod O'Doherty (7 September 1823 – 15 July 1905) was an Irish Australian politician who, as a Young Irelander, had been transported to Tasmania in 1849. He was first elected to the Queensland Legislative Assembly in 1867. In 1885 he returned to Europe briefly serving as an Irish Home Rule MP at Westminster before returning in 1886 as a private citizen to Brisbane.

== Biography ==
O'Doherty was born in Dublin on 7 September 1823, although other sources including the Dictionary of Australasian Biography indicate he was born in June 1824.

O'Doherty arrived in Tasmania in November 1849 and released to live in Oatlands. His professional services were utilised at St. Mary's Hospital, Hobart. The other Irish prisoners nicknamed him 'St Kevin'. (see, Christine Kinealy, 'Repeal and Revolution. 1848 in Ireland', Manchester, 2009).

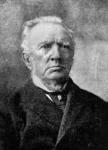
Kevin Izod O'Doherty

== See also ==
- List of convicts transported to Australia

Parliament of Queensland
Preceded by William Brookes	Member for Town of Brisbane; 1867–1873; Served alongside: Alexander Pritchard, Simon Fraser, Ratcliffe Pring, John Killeen Handy, Theophilus Pugh, George Edmondstone	Abolished
Parliament of the United Kingdom
New constituency	Member for North Meath; 1885 – 1886	Succeeded by Pierce Mahony
