= Electoral district of Town of South Brisbane =

Former colonial electoral district of Queensland

Coordinates: 27.48204°S 153.01991°E

Town of South Brisbane Queensland—Legislative Assembly
- State: Queensland
- Dates current: 1860–1873
- Namesake: South Brisbane

Town of South Brisbane was an electoral district of the Legislative Assembly in the Australian state of Queensland from 1860 to 1873.

Taking in areas of Brisbane south of the Brisbane River, it was a single member constituency and one of the original sixteen districts contested at the first colonial election in 1860. The district was renamed South Brisbane at the 1873 election.

== Members for Town of South Brisbane ==
Member	Party	Term
Henry Richards	Unaligned	1860–1863
Thomas Blacket Stephens	Unaligned	1863–1875

== See also ==
- Electoral districts of Queensland
- Members of the Queensland Legislative Assembly by year
- Category:Members of the Queensland Legislative Assembly by name
