= Electoral district of Town of Brisbane =

Former colonial electoral district of Queensland

Town of Brisbane Queensland—Legislative Assembly
- State: Queensland
- Dates current: 1860–1873
- Namesake: Brisbane

Town of Brisbane was an electoral district of the Legislative Assembly in the Australian state of Queensland from 1860 to 1873.

Taking in areas of Brisbane north of the Brisbane River, it was a three-member constituency and one of the original sixteen districts contested at the first colonial election in 1860.

== Members for Town of Brisbane ==
Member	Term	Member	Term	Member	Term
Charles Blakeney	1860–1865	George Raff	1860–1864	Henry Jordan	1860
Charles Blakeney	1860–1865	George Raff	1860–1864	Robert Cribb	1860–1863
Charles Blakeney	1860–1865	George Raff	1860–1864	Theophilus Pugh	1863–1869
Charles Blakeney	1860–1865	William Brookes	1864–1867	Theophilus Pugh	1863–1869
George Raff	1865–1867	William Brookes	1864–1867	Theophilus Pugh	1863–1869
Alexander Pritchard	1867–1868	Kevin O'Doherty	1867–1873	Theophilus Pugh	1863–1869
Simon Fraser	1868–1870	Kevin O'Doherty	1867–1873	Theophilus Pugh	1863–1869
Simon Fraser	1868–1870	Kevin O'Doherty	1867–1873	George Edmondstone	1869–1873
Ratcliffe Pring	1870–1872	Kevin O'Doherty	1867–1873	George Edmondstone	1869–1873
John Handy	1872–1873	Kevin O'Doherty	1867–1873	George Edmondstone	1869–1873

== See also ==
- Electoral districts of Queensland
- Members of the Queensland Legislative Assembly by year
- Category:Members of the Queensland Legislative Assembly by name
