= List of Queensland state by-elections =

The following is a list of state by-elections for the Queensland Legislative Assembly held in the Australian state of Queensland.

== 2020–2029 ==
Parl.	By-election	Date	Previous member	Party	Elected member	Party	Vacated	Cause	Retained
58th	Stafford	16 May 2026	Jimmy Sullivan	Independent	Luke Richmond	Labor	9 April 2026	Death	Yes (Note: Sullivan had previously been a member of Labor, however he had been expelled in May 2025 as a result of a failure to adhere to a safe return to work plan put in place by the party.)
58th	Hinchinbrook	29 November 2025	Nick Dametto	KAP	Wayde Chiesa	LNP	14 October 2025	Resignation	No
57th	Ipswich West	16 March 2024	Jim Madden	Labor	Darren Zanow	LNP	27 January 2024	Resignation	No
57th	Inala	16 March 2024	Annastacia Palaszczuk	Labor	Margie Nightingale	Labor	31 December 2023	Resignation	Yes
57th	Callide	18 June 2022	Colin Boyce	LNP	Bryson Head	LNP	29 March 2022	Resignation	Yes
57th	Stretton	24 July 2021	Duncan Pegg	Labor	James Martin	Labor	10 June 2021	Death	Yes
56th	Bundamba	28 March 2020	Jo-Ann Miller	Labor	Lance McCallum	Labor	20 February 2020	Resignation	Yes
56th	Currumbin	28 March 2020	Jann Stuckey	LNP	Laura Gerber	LNP	1 February 2020	Resignation	Yes

== 2010–2019 ==
Parl.	By-election	Date	Previous member	Party	Elected member	Party	Vacated	Cause	Retained
55th	Toowoomba South	16 July 2016	John McVeigh	LNP	David Janetzki	LNP	29 April 2016	Resignation	Yes
54th	Stafford	19 July 2014	Chris Davis	LNP	Anthony Lynham	Labor	23 May 2014	Resignation	No
54th	Redcliffe	22 February 2014	Scott Driscoll	LNP	Yvette D'Ath	Labor	19 November 2013	Resignation	No
54th	South Brisbane	28 April 2012	Anna Bligh	Labor	Jackie Trad	Labor	30 March 2012	Resignation	Yes

== 2000–2009 ==
Parl.	By-election	Date	Previous member	Party	Elected member	Party	Vacated	Cause	Retained
52nd	Brisbane Central	13 October 2007	Peter Beattie	Labor	Grace Grace	Labor	13 September 2007	Resignation	Yes
51st	Gaven	1 April 2006	Robert Poole	Labor	Alex Douglas	National	28 February 2006	Resignation	No
51st	Chatsworth	20 August 2005	Terry Mackenroth	Labor	Michael Caltabiano	Liberal	25 July 2005	Resignation	No
51st	Redcliffe	20 August 2005	Ray Hollis	Labor	Terry Rogers	Liberal	21 July 2005	Resignation	No
50th	Maryborough	26 April 2003	John Kingston	Independent	Chris Foley	Independent	24 March 2003	Resignation	Yes
50th	Surfers Paradise	5 May 2001	Rob Borbidge	National	Lex Bell	Independent	20 March 2001	Resignation	No
49th	Woodridge	5 February 2000	Bill D'Arcy	Labor	Mike Kaiser	Labor	9 January 2000	Resignation	Yes
49th	Bundamba	5 February 2000	Bob Gibbs	Labor	Jo-Ann Miller	Labor	14 December 1999	Resignation	Yes

== 1990–1999 ==
Parl.	By-election	Date	Previous member	Party	Elected member	Party	Vacated	Cause	Retained
49th	Mulgrave	5 December 1998	Charles Rappolt	One Nation	Warren Pitt	Labor	4 November 1998	Resignation	No
48th	Kurwongbah	24 May 1997	Margaret Woodgate	Labor	Linda Lavarch	Labor	17 March 1997	Resignation	Yes
48th	Lytton	5 October 1996	Tom Burns	Labor	Paul Lucas	Labor	16 May 1996	Resignation	Yes
48th	Mundingburra	3 February 1996	Ken Davies	Labor	Frank Tanti	Liberal	8 December 1995	Election voided	No
47th	Mirani	20 April 1994	Jim Randell	National	Ted Malone	National	31 March 1994	Resignation	Yes
46th	Toowoomba South	18 May 1991	Clive Berghofer	National	Mike Horan	National	23 March 1991	Resignation	Yes
46th	Nundah	18 May 1991	Phil Heath	Labor	Terry Sullivan	Labor	5 April 1991	Resignation	Yes
46th	Sherwood	28 July 1990	Angus Innes	Liberal	David Dunworth	Liberal	13 May 1990	Resignation	Yes
46th	Landsborough	28 July 1990	Mike Ahern	National	Joan Sheldon	Liberal	6 May 1990	Resignation	No

== 1980–1989 ==
Parl.	By-election	Date	Previous member	Party	Elected member	Party	Vacated	Cause	Retained
45th	Merthyr	13 May 1989	Don Lane	National	Santo Santoro	Liberal	20 January 1989	Resignation	No
45th	South Coast	28 August 1988	Russ Hinze	National	Judy Gamin	National	24 May 1988	Resignation	Yes
45th	Barambah	16 April 1988	Joh Bjelke-Petersen	National	Trevor Perrett	CEC	1 December 1987	Resignation	No
45th	Southport	20 June 1987	Doug Jennings	National	Mick Veivers	National	9 April 1987	Death	Yes
44th	Redlands	2 November 1985	John Goleby	National	Paul Clauson	National	10 September 1985	Death	Yes
44th	Rockhampton	16 February 1985	Keith Wright	Labor	Paul Braddy	Labor	5 November 1984	Resignation	Yes
44th	Stafford	4 August 1984	Denis Murphy	Labor	Terry Gygar	Liberal	21 June 1984	Death	No
44th	Archerfield	19 May 1984	Kevin Hooper	Labor	Henry Palaszczuk	Labor	9 March 1984	Death	Yes

== 1970–1979 ==
Parl.	By-election	Date	Previous member	Party	Elected member	Party	Vacated	Cause	Retained
42nd	Gympie	1 September 1979	Max Hodges	National	Len Stephan	National	8 August 1979	Resignation	Yes
42nd	Redcliffe	1 September 1979	Jim Houghton	National	Terry White	Liberal	7 August 1979	Resignation	No
42nd	Sherwood	25 November 1978	John Herbert	Liberal	Angus Innes	Liberal	13 September 1978	Death	Yes
41st	Lockyer	16 October 1976	Gordon Chalk	Liberal	Tony Bourke	Liberal	12 August 1976	Resignation	Yes
41st	Port Curtis	29 May 1976	Martin Hanson	Labor	Bill Prest	Labor	19 February 1976	Resignation	Yes
41st	Clayfield	29 May 1976	John Murray	Liberal	Ivan Brown	Liberal	11 February 1976	Resignation	Yes
39th	Merthyr	24 July 1971	Ray Ramsden	Liberal	Don Lane	Liberal	30 June 1971	Resignation	Yes
39th	Maryborough	24 July 1971	Horace Davies	Labor	Gilbert Alison	Liberal	4 June 1971	Death	No
39th	Albert	14 February 1970	Cec Carey	Country	Bill Heatley	Liberal	26 December 1969	Death	No

== 1960–1969 ==
Parl.	By-election	Date	Previous member	Party	Elected member	Party	Vacated	Cause	Retained
38th	Isis	16 November 1968	Jack Pizzey	Country	Jim Blake	Labor	31 July 1968	Death	No
38th	Landsborough	16 March 1968	Frank Nicklin	Country	Mike Ahern	Country	13 February 1968	Resignation	Yes
38th	Roma	24 June 1967	William Ewan	Country	Ken Tomkins	Country	14 March 1967	Death	Yes
37th	Mirani	15 May 1965	Ernie Evans	Country	Tom Newbery	Country	28 February 1965	Death	Yes
37th	Cairns	27 February 1965	George Wallace	Labor	Ray Jones	Labor	12 October 1964	Death	Yes
37th	Yeronga	6 June 1964	Winston Noble	Liberal	Norm Lee	Liberal	28 March 1964	Death	Yes
37th	Warwick	19 October 1963	Otto Madsen	Country	David Cory	Country	3 August 1963	Death	Yes
36th	Whitsunday	1 July 1961	Lloyd Roberts	Country	Ron Camm	Country	11 March 1961	Death	Yes
36th	Barcoo	1 July 1961	Edward Davis	Labor	Eugene O'Donnell	Labor	10 March 1961	Death	Yes

== 1950–1959 ==
Parl.	By-election	Date	Previous member	Party	Elected member	Party	Vacated	Cause	Retained
35th	Mulgrave	6 June 1959	Robert Watson	Country	Carlisle Wordsworth	Country	26 March 1959	Death	Yes
35th	North Toowoomba	17 May 1958	Les Wood	Labor	Jack Duggan	Labor	29 March 1958	Death	Yes
35th	Flinders	17 May 1958	Bill Longeran	Country	Bill Longeran	Country	4 March 1958	Election voided	Yes
34th	Ithaca	8 December 1956	Leonard Eastment	Labor	Pat Hanlon	Labor	29 July 1956	Death	Yes
33rd	Flinders	12 March 1955	Ernest Riordan	Labor	Frank Forde	Labor	9 December 1954	Death	Yes
33rd	Maryborough	28 November 1953	David Farrell	Labor	Horace Davies	Labor	17 August 1953	Death	Yes
32nd	Keppel	25 October 1952	Walter Ingram	Labor	Viv Cooper	Labor	24 July 1952	Death	Yes
32nd	Ithaca	5 April 1952	Ned Hanlon	Labor	Leonard Eastment	Labor	15 January 1952	Death	Yes
32nd	Bulimba	14 April 1951	Robert Gardner	Labor	Robert Gardner	Labor	18 January 1951	Election voided	Yes
32nd	Kedron	14 April 1951	Bruce Pie	Liberal	Eric Lloyd	Labor	6 January 1951	Resignation	No
32nd	Warrego	3 March 1951	Harry O'Shea	Labor	John Dufficy	Labor	4 November 1950	Death	Yes
32nd	Fortitude Valley	18 November 1950	Samuel Brassington	Labor	Michael Brosnan	Labor	4 October 1950	Death	Yes

== 1940–1949 ==
Parl.	By-election	Date	Previous member	Party	Elected member	Party	Vacated	Cause	Retained
31st	Kurilpa	10 September 1949	Patrick Copley	Labor	Thomas Moores	Labor	18 July 1949	Death	Yes
31st	Ipswich	10 September 1949	David Gledson	Labor	Ivor Marsden	Labor	14 May 1949	Death	Yes
30th	Bremer	25 May 1946	Frank Cooper	Labor	Jim Donald	Labor	12 March 1946	Resignation	Yes
30th	East Toowoomba	2 March 1946	Herbert Yeates	Country	Les Wood	Labor	24 December 1945	Death	No
29th	Hamilton	9 October 1943	Bruce Pie	Ind. Democrat	John Beals Chandler	Ind./QPP	30 June 1943	Resignation	No
29th	Barcoo	1 May 1943	Frank Bulcock	Labor	Edward Davis	Labor	15 December 1942	Resignation	Yes
29th	Oxley	20 March 1943	Thomas Nimmo	UAP/CNO	Thomas Kerr	UAP/CNO	6 February 1943	Death	Yes
29th	Mackay	20 March 1943	William Forgan Smith	Labor	Fred Graham	Labor	9 December 1942	Resignation	Yes
29th	Cairns	31 October 1942	John O'Keefe	Labor	Lou Barnes	Ind. Labor	27 January 1942	Death	No
29th	Warrego	30 August 1941	Randolph Bedford	Labor	Harry O'Shea	Labor	7 July 1941	Death	Yes
28th	Herbert	9 November 1940	Percy Pease	Labor	Stephen Theodore	Labor	17 September 1940	Death	Yes
28th	Merthyr	9 November 1940	James Keogh	Labor	Bill Moore	Labor	31 August 1940	Death	Yes

== 1930–1939 ==
Parl.	By-election	Date	Previous member	Party	Elected member	Party	Vacated	Cause	Retained
28th	Townsville	27 May 1939	Maurice Hynes	Labor	George Keyatta	Labor	27 March 1939	Death	Yes
28th	Gregory	27 May 1939	George Pollock	Labor	Charles Brown	Independent	24 March 1939	Death	No
28th	Charters Towers	27 May 1939	William Wellington	Labor	Arthur Jones	Labor	2 March 1939	Death	Yes
27th	Warrego	4 December 1937	Randolph Bedford	Labor	Randolph Bedford	Labor	8 September 1937	Resignation	Yes
27th	Maryborough	27 February 1937	James Stopford	Labor	William Demaine	Labor	30 November 1936	Death	Yes
27th	Bowen	20 June 1936	Charles Collins	Labor	Ernest Riordan	Labor	28 March 1936	Death	Yes
27th	Keppel	4 April 1936	Owen Daniel	CPNP	David Daniel	CPNP	5 January 1936	Death	Yes
27th	Brisbane	4 April 1936	Robert Funnell	Labor	Johnno Mann	Labor	3 January 1936	Death	Yes
27th	Toowoomba	14 December 1935	Evan Llewelyn	Labor	Jack Duggan	Labor	28 November 1935	Resignation	Yes
26th	East Toowoomba	18 August 1934	Robert Roberts	CPNP	James Annand	CPNP	2 June 1934	Death	Yes
26th	Stanley	9 December 1933	Ernest Grimstone	CPNP	Roy Bell	CPNP	22 October 1933	Death	Yes
26th	Fortitude Valley	15 July 1933	Thomas Wilson	Labor	Samuel Brassington	Labor	19 May 1933	Death	Yes
26th	Wynnum	29 April 1933	Walter Barnes	CPNP	James Bayley	CPNP	19 February 1933	Death	Yes
25th	Fassifern	28 June 1930	Ernest Bell	CPNP	Arnold Wienholt	Independent	2 May 1930	Death	No
25th	Cairns	10 May 1930	William McCormack	Labor	John O'Keefe	Labor	21 February 1930	Resignation	Yes

== 1920–1929 ==
Parl.	By-election	Date	Previous member	Party	Elected member	Party	Vacated	Cause	Retained
25th	Burke	2 November 1929	Darby Riordan	Labor	Arthur Jones	Labor	16 September 1929	Resignation	Yes
25th	Maryborough	26 October 1929	David Weir	Labor	John Blackley	CPNP	22 September 1929	Death	No
24th	Burnett	13 October 1928	Bernard Corser	CPNP	Robert Boyd	CPNP	16 August 1928	Resignation	Yes
24th	Mitchell	26 May 1928	John Payne	Labor	Richard Bow	Labor	24 January 1928	Death	Yes
24th	Stanley	25 February 1928	Frederick Lancelot Nott	CPNP	Ernest Grimstone	CPNP	5 December 1927	Death	Yes
24th	Balonne	6 August 1927	Edward Land	Labor	Samuel Brassington	Labor	2 May 1927	Death	Yes
23rd	Eacham	16 January 1926	William Gillies	Labor	Cornelius Ryan	Labor	24 October 1925	Resignation	Yes
23rd	Chillagoe	16 January 1926	Ted Theodore	Labor	John O'Keefe	Labor	22 September 1925	Resignation	Yes
23rd	Toowoomba	4 April 1925	Frank Brennan	Labor	Evan Llewelyn	Labor	26 February 1925	Resignation	Yes
23rd	Buranda	16 August 1924	John Huxham	Labor	Edward Hanson	Labor	31 July 1924	Resignation	Yes
23rd	Warrego	13 October 1923	Harry Coyne	Labor	Randolph Bedford	Labor	31 July 1923	Resignation	Yes
22nd	Rockhampton	17 February 1923	Frank Forde	Labor	George Farrell	Labor	5 October 1922	Resignation	Yes
22nd	Paddington	18 March 1922	John Fihelly	Labor	Alfred Jones	Labor	7 February 1922	Resignation	Yes
21st	Herbert	10 April 1920	William Lennon	Labor	Percy Pease	Labor	16 January 1920	Resignation	Yes

== 1910–1919 ==
Parl.	By-election	Date	Previous member	Party	Elected member	Party	Vacated	Cause	Retained
21st	Maranoa	20 December 1919	John McEwan Hunter	Labor	Thomas Spencer	Country	22 October 1919	Resignation	No
21st	Leichhardt	20 December 1919	Herbert Hardacre	Labor	Tom Foley	Labor	14 October 1919	Resignation	Yes
21st	Barcoo	20 December 1919	T. J. Ryan	Labor	Frank Bulcock	Labor	14 October 1919	Resignation	Yes
20th	Rockhampton	12 May 1917	John Adamson	Independent	Frank Forde	Labor	21 March 1917	Resignation	No
20th	Maryborough	31 March 1917	Alfred Jones	Labor	David Weir	Labor	15 February 1917	Appointment to Council	Yes
20th	Fortitude Valley	1 April 1916	David Bowman	Labor	Thomas Wilson	Labor	25 February 1916	Death	Yes
20th	Gregory	18 August 1915	William Hamilton	Labor	George Pollock	Labor	10 July 1915	Appointment to Council	Yes
19th	Normanby	5 March 1914	George Fox	Liberal	Edward Archer	Liberal	27 January 1914	Death	Yes
19th	Fassifern	24 April 1913	Arnold Wienholt	Liberal	Ernest Bell	Liberal	28 March 1913	Resignation	Yes
19th	Port Curtis	26 October 1912	Edward Breslin	Labor	John Kessell	Liberal	9 October 1912	Election voided	No
19th	Maryborough	12 October 1912	Edward Corser	Liberal	Edward Corser	Liberal	September 1912	Election voided	Yes
18th	Brisbane North	16 September 1911	Edward Macartney	Liberal	Thomas Welsby	Liberal	5 September 1911	Resignation	Yes
18th	Toowong	16 September 1911	Richard John Cottell	Liberal	Edward Macartney	Liberal	30 August 1911	Death	Yes
18th	Rosewood	16 September 1911	Denis Keogh	Liberal	Henry Stevens	Liberal	24 August 1911	Death	Yes
18th	Dalby	2 April 1911	Joshua Thomas Bell	Liberal	William Vowles	Liberal	10 March 1911	Death	Yes
18th	Enoggera	25 February 1911	Arthur Hawthorn	Liberal	Richard Trout	Liberal	7 February 1911	Appointed to Council	Yes
18th	Rockhampton	25 February 1911	William Kidston	Liberal	John Adamson	Labor	7 February 1911	Resignation	No

== 1900–1909 ==
Parl.	Electorate	By-election	Previous member	Party	Elected member	Party	Vacated	Cause	Retained
13th	Bundaberg	14 July 1900	Thomas Glassey	Labour	Thomas Glassey		1900	resigned from ALP	Yes
13th	Toowong	24 November 1900	Thomas Finney	Ministerial	Edward Macartney	Ministerial	5 October 1900	resigned	
13th	Bulimba	16 February 1901	James Dickson	Ministerial	Walter Barnes	Ministerial	10 January 1901	died	
13th	Normanby	13 April 1901	John Murray	Ministerial	George Fox	Ministerial	1 March 1901	died	
13th	Mackay	25 May 1901	James Chataway	Ministerial	Walter Paget	Ministerial	12 April 1901	died	
13th	Gympie	8 June 1901	Andrew Fisher	Labour	Daniel Mulcahy	Labour	9 May 1901	resigned, moved to federal parliament	Yes
13th	Drayton and Toowoomba	22 June 1901	William Henry Groom	Opposition	James Tolmie	Independent Ministerialist	4 June 1901	resigned, moved to federal parliament	
13th	Rockhampton North	22 June 1901	James Stewart	Labour	Henry Turner	Labour	5 June 1901	resigned, moved to federal parliament	Yes
13th	Rockhampton North	17 October 1901	Henry Turner	Labour	John Linnett declared elected	Independent	17 October 1901	petition	No
13th	Bundaberg	6 July 1901	Thomas Glassey	Independent	George Barber	Labour	22 June 1901	resigned, moved to federal parliament	
13th	Charters Towers	6 July 1901	Anderson Dawson	Labour	John Burrows	Labour	11 June 1901	resigned, moved to federal parliament	Yes
13th	Fortitude Valley	27 July 1901	William Higgs	Labour	John McMaster	Ministerial	17 July 1901	resigned, moved to federal parliament	No
13th	Flinders	3 August 1901	Charles McDonald	Labour	Peter Airey	Labour	24 June 1901	resigned, moved to federal parliament	Yes
13th	Brisbane North	6 August 1901	Thomas Macdonald-Paterson	Ministerial	John Cameron	Ministerial	31 July 1901	resigned, moved to federal parliament	
14th	Maryborough	3 July 1902	Charles Hastings Barton	Labour	Henry Garde	Ministerial	16 June 1902	died	
14th	Oxley	3 July 1902	Samuel Grimes	Ministerial	Digby Denham	Ministerial	18 June 1902	died	
14th	Fassifern	13 January 1903	Thomas de Montmorency Murray-Prior	Opposition	Charles Moffatt Jenkinson	Opposition	11 December 1902	died	
14th	Musgrave	4 April 1903	William O'Connell	Ministerial	John White	Ministerial	4 March 1903	died	
14th	Cunningham	29 October 1903	Francis Kates	Ministerial	Duncan Watson	Ministerialist	16 September 1903	died	
15th	Croydon	21 May 1904	William Browne	Labour	William Murphy	Labour	12 April 1904	Died	Yes
15th	Drayton and Toowoomba	1 October 1904	John Fogarty	Liberal	Edward Smart	Labour	9 September 1904	Died	No
15th	Rosewood	12 December 1904	Robert Hodge	Liberal	Denis Keogh appointed	Labour		petition	No
15th	Mitchell	13 May 1905	Arthur Cooper	Liberal	John Payne	Labour	14 April 1905	Resigned	No
15th	Burrum	17 June 1905	George Martin	Labour	Colin Rankin	Independent	14 May 1905	Died	No
15th	Charters Towers	7 October 1905	John Dunsford	Labour	William Paull	Independent	15 September 1905	Died	No
15th	Warwick	10 February 1906	Arthur Morgan	Liberal	Thomas O'Sullivan	Liberal	19 January 1906	Resigned, moved to the Queensland Legislative Council	Yes
17th	Bulloo	27 March 1909	John Leahy	Liberal	Frank Allen	Labour	20 January 1909	Died	No
17th	Moreton	27 May 1909	John Dunmore Campbell	Liberal	James Forsythe	Liberal	20 January 1909	Died	Yes

== 1890–1899 ==
Parl.	Electorate	By-election	Previous member	Party	Elected member	Party	Vacated	Cause	Retained
10th	Burke	9 August 1890	Ernest Hunter		John Hoolan	Labour	24 June 1890	resigned insolvent	
10th	South Brisbane	17 July 1890	Henry Jordan		Arthur Morry		30 June 1890	died	
10th	Townsville	2 May 1891	John Murtagh Macrossan		William Villiers Brown		30 March 1891	died	
10th	Burnett	11 July 1891	George Hall Jones		James Cadell		12 June 1891	resigned	
10th	Barcoo	5 March 1892	Frank Reid Murphy		Tommy Ryan	Labour	24 January 1892	died	
10th	Bulimba	16 April 1892	John Francis Buckland		James Dickson		29 March 1892	resigned insolvent	
10th	Bundaberg	16 June 1892	Walter Adams		George Hall	Labour	15 May 1892	died	
10th	Rosewood	15 November 1892	Jean-Baptiste Isambert		James Foote		15 October 1892	resigned insolvent	
11th	Townsville	20 January 1894	George Burns	Ministerialist	Anthony Ogden	Labour	5 November 1893	died	
11th	Ipswich	31 March 1894	John MacFarlane	Ministerialist	James Wilkinson	Labour	7 March 1894	died	
11th	Burke	16 June 1894	John Hoolan	Labour	Thomas Glassey	Labour	12 March 1894	resigned for Glassey	Yes
11th	Aubigny	4 August 1894	William Lovejoy	Opposition	William Thorn	Opposition	17 July 1894	resigned insolvent	No
11th	Toombul	4 August 1894	Andrew Lang Petrie		Andrew Lang Petrie		17 July 1894	resigned insolvent	Yes
12th	Logan	11 July 1896	John Donaldson	Independent	John Donaldson	Independent	June 1896	petition	Yes
12th	Logan	15 August 1896	John Donaldson	Independent	James Stodart	Ministerial	25 July 1896	died	
12th	Rosewood	29 August 1896	Denis Keogh	Labour	Denis Keogh	Labour	11 August 1896	election voided	Yes
12th	Wide Bay	19 March 1898	Horace Tozer	Ministerial	Charles Moffatt Jenkinson	Opposition	2 March 1898	resigned	
12th	Burnett	28 May 1898	William McCord	Ministerial	William Ryott Maughan	Labour	14 April 1898	died	
12th	Murilla	28 May 1898	Hugh Nelson		William Moore	Ministerial	13 April 1898	moved to Council	
12th	Rockhampton	20 August 1898	George Curtis	Independent	George Curtis unopposed	Independent	August 1898	resigned to re-contest	Yes
12th	Warrego	22 October 1898	James Crombie	Ministerial	William Hood	Ministerial	17 September 1898	died	Yes
12th	Warwick	22 October 1898	Thomas Joseph Byrnes		Arthur Morgan	Opposition	27 September 1898	died	
13th	Brisbane North	20 April 1899	Edward Barrow Forrest	Ministerial	Edward Barrow Forrest unopposed	Ministerial		resigned to re-contest	Yes
13th	Moreton	20 April 1899	John Dunmore Campbell	Ministerial	John Dunmore Campbell unopposed	Ministerial		resigned to re-contest	Yes
13th	South Brisbane	22 July 1899	Abraham Luya	Ministerial	Henry Turley	Labour	6 July 1899	died	
13th	Warrego	16 December 1899	William Hood	Ministerial	David Bowman	Labour	21 November 1899	election voided	No
13th	Enoggera	23 December 1899	James Drake	Opposition	Matthew Reid	Labour	7 December 1899	moved to Council	

== 1880–1889 ==
Parl.	Electorate	By-election	Previous member	Elected member	Vacated	Cause	Retained
8th	South Brisbane	6 April 1880			24 March 1880	retired, ill health	
8th	Leichhardt	6 May 1880			10 April 1880	died	
8th	Bowen	29 June 1880			4 June 1880	re-contest as minister	Yes
8th	Bundamba	12 November 1880			26 October 1880	resigned insolvent	
8th	Maryborough	13 December 1880			24 November 1880	resigned	
8th	Drayton and Toowoomba	14 January 1881			1 January 1881	died	
8th	Bowen	24 January 1881			25 December 1880	died	
8th	Mitchell	3 February 1881			30 December 1880	moved to Council	
8th	Mackay	24 March 1881			3 January 1881	died	
8th	Ipswich	8 August 1881			27 July 1881	resigned	
8th	Rockhampton	8 October 1881			21 September 1881	died	
8th	Darling Downs	29 November 1881			1 November 1881	resigned	
8th	North Brisbane	13 January 1882			24 December 1881	moved to Council	
8th	Dalby	31 January 1882			20 January 1882	resigned	
8th	Gregory	21 March 1882			20 February 1882	resigned	
8th	Mitchell	27 April 1882			5 April 1882	resigned	
8th	Bulimba	13 July 1882			4 July 1882	resigned	
8th	Rosewood	17 July 1882			4 July 1882	resigned	
8th	Bowen	18 January 1883			5 January 1883	resigned	
9th	Leichhardt	7 December 1883			13 November 1883	re-contest as minister	Yes
9th	Moreton	21 November 1883			13 November 1883	moved to Council	
9th	Cook	4 March 1884			4 March 1884	disqualified	
9th	Maryborough	25 July 1884			8 July 1884	resigned insolvent	
9th	Moreton	13 May 1885			22 April 1885	moved to Council	
9th	Cook	16 September 1885			4 August 1885	resigned insolvent	
9th	Enoggera	26 October 1885			13 October 1885	resigned, ill health	
9th	Fortitude Valley	14 September 1885				additional member	
9th	Townsville	11 November 1885				additional member	
9th	Barcoo	24 November 1885				new electorate	
9th	Musgrave	5 January 1886				new electorate	
9th	Blackall	13 April 1886			23 January 1886	resigned	
9th	Fortitude Valley	1 May 1886			16 April 1886	died	
9th	Mulgrave	10 July 1886			5 June 1886	resigned	
9th	Warwick	18 July 1887			2 July 1887	resigned	
9th	Fassifern	4 August 1887			19 July 1887	resigned	
9th	Fassifern	4 August 1887			19 July 1887	resigned	
9th	Darling Downs	6 September 1887			22 August 1887	died	
10th	Fitzroy	3 August 1889			17 July 1889	resigned	

== 1870–1879 ==
Parl.	Electorate	By-election	Previous member	Elected member	Vacated	Cause	Retained
4th	Warrego	5 January 1870			23 November 1869	resigned	
4th	Mitchell	8 February 1870			3 December 1869	resigned	
4th	East Moreton	17 February 1870			17 February 1870	resigned	
4th	Clermont	4 May 1870			4 April 1870	resigned	
4th	Rockhampton	20 June 1870			7 June 1870	resigned	No
4th	West Moreton	25 June 1870			13 June 1870	resigned	
5th	Burnett	3 April 1871			23 March 1871	resigned	
6th	Wide Bay	4 October 1871			29 September 1871	resigned	
6th	East Moreton	4 November 1871			20 October 1871	resigned	
6th	Burnett	7 November 1871			24 October 1871	resigned	
6th	Town of Brisbane	27 January 1872			11 January 1872	resigned	
6th	Leichhardt	20 February 1872			30 January 1872	died	
6th	East Moreton	3 April 1872			7 March 1872	resigned	
6th	Clermont	30 April 1872			9 April 1872	resigned	
6th	Ipswich	22 October 1872			9 October 1872	died	
	Wide Bay	12 November 1873					
7th	Carnarvon	20 January 1874			8 January 1874	re-contest as minister	No
7th	Fassifern	24 January 1874			8 January 1874	resigned, moved to Council	
7th	Fortitude Valley	25 February 1874			14 February 1874	resigned	
7th	Balonne	25 February 1874			27 May 1874	election voided	
7th	Logan	8 June 1874			27 May 1874	election voided	Yes
7th	Ravenswood	9 December 1874			13 November 1874	resigned	
7th	Darling Downs	23 March 1875			1 February 1875	resigned	
7th	Maryborough	2 April 1875			16 March 1875	resigned	
7th	Logan	16 April 1875			3 April 1875	resigned	
7th	Bowen	14 May 1975			5 May 1875	resigned	
7th	South Brisbane	26 May 1875			13 May 1875	resigned	
7th	Logan	19 October 1875			3 October 1875	resigned	
7th	Burke	26 October 1875			13 September 1875	resigned	
7th	Carnarvon	8 January 1876			14 October 1875	resigned	
7th	Leichhardt	12 January 1876			8 December 1875	resigned	
7th	Clermont	4 February 1876			4 January 1876	resigned	
7th	Logan	9 May 1876			12 April 1876	resigned	
7th	Cook	1 June 1876				new electorate	
7th	Ipswich	20 June 1876			14 June 1876	resigned	
7th	Bulimba	7 July 1876			26 June 1876	resigned	
7th	Burke	7 July 1876			22 August 1876	resigned	
7th	Northern Downs	14 November 1876			30 October 1876	resigned	
7th	Bulimba	18 November 1876			7 November 1876	died	
7th	Gympie	23 March 1877			9 March 1877	resigned	
7th	Normanby	19 April 1877			20 March 1877	resigned	
7th	Bowen	23 April 1877			24 March 1877	resigned	
7th	Aubigny	1 May 1877			9 April 1877	resigned	
7th	East Moreton	10 May 1877			24 April 1877	resigned	
7th	Wickham	12 May 1877			28 April 1877	resigned	
7th	Rockhampton	20 November 1877			26 October 1877	resigned	
7th	Brisbane City	12 February 1878			1 February 1878	resigned	
7th	Ipswich	7 March 1878			12 February 1878	resigned	
7th	Fassifern	9 April 1878			12 March 1878	resigned	
8th	Ipswich	1 February 1879			21 January 1879	re-contest as minister	Yes
8th	Townsville	4 March 1879			3 February 1879	resigned	
8th	Clermont	4 March 1879			1 March 1879	resigned	
8th	Leichhardt	17 April 1879			24 March 1879	resigned	
8th	Northern Downs	17 April 1879			3 April 1879	resigned, moved to Council	
8th	Fortitude Valley	28 May 1879			16 May 1879	vacated on petition	No

== 1860–1869 ==
Parl.	Electorate	By-election	Previous member	Elected member	Vacated	Cause	Retained
1st	West Moreton	9 July 1860			22 June 1860	unseated by petition	
1st	East Moreton	27 October 1860			29 September 1860	resigned	
1st	Town of Brisbane	8 December 1860			17 October 1860	resigned	
1st	West Moreton	12 January 1861			21 December 1860	resigned	
1st	West Moreton	31 May 1861			16 May 1861	resigned	Yes
1st	Port Curtis	15 October 1861			3 September 1861	resigned	
1st	Warwick	4 February 1862			14 January 1862	re-contest as minister	
1st	Eastern Downs	2 May 1862			22 April 1862	resigned	
1st	Drayton and Toowoomba	11 August 1862			26 July 1862	resigned	
1st	West Moreton	15 December 1862			3 November 1862	resigned	
1st	Port Curtis	12 May 1863			11 April 1863	resigned	
2nd	East Moreton	26 September 1863			15 September 1863	election voided	No; Yes
2nd	Leichhardt	14 April 1864			8 February 1864	resigned	
2nd	Town of Brisbane	22 April 1864			8 April 1864	resigned	
2nd	Maranoa	27 September 1864			28 July 1864	unseated	
2nd	Western Downs	2 November 1864			2 October 1864	died	
2nd	Maryborough	1 February 1865				new electorate	
2nd	Rockhampton	1 February 1865				new electorate	
2nd	Clermont	18 March 1865				new electorate	
2nd	Kennedy	18 March 1865				new electorate	
2nd	Mitchell	25 March 1865				new electorate	
2nd	Warrego	25 March 1865				new electorate	
2nd	Burnett	13 May 1865			15 April 1865	resigned	
2nd	Town of Brisbane	23 November 1865			November 1865	resigned	
2nd	Mitchell	22 February 1866			1 January 1866	resigned	
2nd	Port Curtis	19 March 1866			1 February 1866	re-contest as minister	No
2nd	Ipswich	4 August 1866			21 July 1866	re-contest as minister	No
2nd	West Moreton	11 September 1866			21 July 1866	resigned	
2nd	Clermont	11 September 1866			18 August 1866	resigned	
2nd	Clermont	13 November 1866			12 October 1866	resigned	
2nd	Mitchell	4 January 1867			22 November 1866	resigned	
3rd	Rockhampton	27 July 1867			30 June 1867	resigned to win Kennedy	
3rd	Clermont	22 June 1868			11 May 1868	resigned	
3rd	Leichhardt	29 June 1868			11 May 1868	resigned	
4th	East Moreton	23 December 1868			11 December 1868	resigned	
4th	Town of Brisbane	10 February 1869			30 January 1869	resigned	
4th	Clermont	4 March 1869			29 January 1869	resigned	
4th	Burnett	21 April 1869			6 April 1869	retired	
4th	Kennedy	10 July 1869			11 June 1869	resigned	
4th	Rockhampton	6 December 1869			19 November 1869	resigned	
