= Members of the Queensland Legislative Assembly, 1896–1899 =

This is a list of members of the 12th Legislative Assembly of Queensland from 1896 to 1899, as elected at the 1896 colonial election held between 10 March 1896 and 11 April 1896 (due to problems of distance and communications, it was not possible to hold the elections on a single day).

Name	Party	Electorate	Term in office
John Annear	Ministerial	Maryborough	1884–1902
William Drayton Armstrong	Ministerial	Lockyer	1893–1904; 1907–1918
John Bartholomew	Ministerial	Maryborough	1896–1902
Matthew Battersby	Ministerial	Moreton	1888–1899
Joshua Thomas Bell	Ministerial	Dalby	1893–1911
Jason Boles	Opposition	Port Curtis	1893–1904
Thomas Bridges	Opp./Min.	Nundah	1896–1907; 1909–1918
William Browne	Labour	Croydon	1893–1904
Hon. Thomas Joseph Byrnes^{[8]}	Ministerial	Warwick	1893–1898
Albert Callan	Ministerial	Fitzroy	1889–1902
William Castling	Ministerial	Townsville	1896–1899
James Chataway	Ministerial	Mackay	1893–1901
Robert Collins	Ind./Min.	Albert	1896–1899
William Henry Corfield	Ministerial	Gregory	1888–1899
Alfred Cowley	Ministerial	Herbert	1888–1907
Thomas Bridson Cribb	Ministerial	Ipswich	1896–1904
James Crombie^{[7]}	Ministerial	Warrego	1888–1898
John Cross	Labour	Clermont	1893–1899
George Curtis^{[6]}	Opp./Ind.	Rockhampton	1893–1902
David Dalrymple	Ministerial	Mackay	1888–1904
Henry Daniels	Labour	Cambooya	1893–1899
Anderson Dawson	Labour	Charters Towers	1893–1901
Thomas Dibley	Labour	Woolloongabba	1896–1907
Hon. James Dickson	Independent	Bulimba	1873–1888; 1892–1901
John Donaldson^{[1]}	Independent	Logan	1883–1893; 1896
James Drake	Opposition	Enoggera	1888–1899
John Dunsford	Labour	Charters Towers	1893–1905
Thomas Finney	Ind./Min.	Toowong	1896–1900
Charles Fitzgerald	Labour	Mitchell	1896–1902
John Fogarty	Opposition	Drayton and Toowoomba	1893–1904
Justin Foxton	Ministerial	Carnarvon	1883–1904
Robert Fraser	Ind./Min.	Brisbane North	1896–1899
Thomas Glassey	Labour	Bundaberg	1888–1893; 1894–1901
Samuel Grimes	Ministerial	Oxley	1878–1902
William Henry Groom	Opposition	Drayton and Toowoomba	1862–1901
John Hamilton	Ministerial	Cook	1878–1904
Herbert Hardacre	Labour	Leichhardt	1893–1919
William Hood^{[7]}	Ministerial	Warrego	1898–1899
John Hoolan	Labour	Burke	1890–1894; 1896–1899
George Jackson	Labour	Kennedy	1893–1909
Charles Moffatt Jenkinson^{[3]}	Opposition	Wide Bay	1898–1902; 1903–1909
Denis Keogh^{[2]}	Labour	Rosewood	1896–1902; 1904–1911
George Kerr	Labour	Barcoo	1893–1909
William Kidston	Labour	Rockhampton	1896–1911
Robert King	Labour	Maranoa	1893–1899
John Leahy	Independent	Bulloo	1893–1909
Isidor Lissner	Ministerial	Cairns	1883–1893; 1896–1899
Frederick Lord	Ministerial	Stanley	1893–1902
William McCord^{[4]}	Ministerial	Burnett	1896–1898
Charles McDonald	Labour	Flinders	1893–1901
Thomas Macdonald-Paterson	Ind./Min.	Brisbane North	1878–1885; 1896–1901
Frank McDonnell	Labour	Fortitude Valley	1896–1907
Thomas McGahan	Farmers' Rep.	Cunningham	1896–1899
John McMaster	Ministerial	Fortitude Valley	1885–1899; 1901–1904; 1907–1908
William Ryott Maughan^{[4]}	Labour	Burnett	1898–1899; 1904–1912
William Moore^{[5]}	Ministerial	Murilla	1898–1904; 1907–1909
Arthur Morgan^{[8]}	Ministerial	Warwick	1887–1896; 1898–1906
John Murray	Ministerial	Normanby	1888–1901
Hon. Hugh Nelson^{[5]}	Ministerial	Murilla	1883–1898
John Newell	Ministerial	Woothakata	1896–1902
William O'Connell	Ministerial	Musgrave	1888–1903
Andrew Lang Petrie	Ministerial	Toombul	1893–1926
Robert Philp	Ministerial	Townsville	1886–1915
George Sim	Labour	Carpentaria	1896–1899
Robert Harrison Smith	Ministerial	Bowen	1888–1902
William Smyth	Ministerial	Gympie	1883–1899
William Stephens	Ministerial	South Brisbane	1888–1904; 1907–1908
Alfred John Stephenson	Ministerial	Ipswich	1896–1902
James Stewart	Labour	North Rockhampton	1896–1901
James Stodart^{[1]}	Ministerial	Logan	1896–1918
George Story	Ministerial	Balonne	1896–1904
Jacob Stumm	Ministerial	Gympie	1896–1899
Lewis Thomas	Ministerial	Bundamba	1893–1899
George Thorn	Ministerial	Fassifern	1867–1874; 1876–1878; 1879–1883; 1887–1888; 1893–1902
William Thorn	Opposition	Aubigny	1894–1904; 1908–1912
Nicholas Tooth	Ministerial	Burrum	1893–1902
Horace Tozer^{[3]}	Ministerial	Wide Bay	1871; 1888–1898
Henry Turley	Labour	South Brisbane	1893–1902

== See also ==
- Premier:

Hugh Nelson (Ministerial) (1893–1898)
Thomas Joseph Byrnes (Ministerial) (1898)
James Dickson (Ministerial) (1898–1899)

== Notes ==
^{1} In June 1896, John Donaldson, the Independent member for Logan, resigned after a petition was lodged against his return (although the original election was not declared void). A by-election was held on 11 July 1896, at which he was re-elected against a different opponent. However, he died two weeks later of kidney disease, and at the second by-election held on 15 August 1896, Ministerial candidate James Stodart was elected.
^{2} At the 1896 election in Rosewood, Labour candidate Denis Keogh won by 20 votes and, following a petition by Ministerial candidate Stephen Hardgrave, the election was declared void on 11 August 1896. At the resulting by-election on 29 August, Keogh was re-elected.
^{3} On 2 March 1898, Horace Tozer, the Ministerial member for Wide Bay, was appointed as Agent-General for Queensland, and resigned his seat. Opposition candidate Charles Moffatt Jenkinson, who counted upon Labour support, won the resulting by-election on 19 March 1898.
^{4} On 14 April 1898, William McCord, the Ministerial member for Burnett, died. Labour candidate William Ryott Maughan won the resulting by-election on 28 May 1898.
^{5} On 13 April 1898, the Premier and member for Murilla, Hugh Nelson, was appointed to the Queensland Legislative Council to fill the vacancy caused by the death of the President, Sir Arthur Hunter Palmer. Ministerial candidate William Moore won the resulting by-election on 28 May 1898.
^{6} In August 1898, George Curtis, the Independent member for Rockhampton, resigned to recontest his seat at a by-election. He was returned unopposed at the close of nominations on 20 August 1898.
^{7} On 17 September 1898, James Crombie, the Ministerial member for Warrego, died. Ministerial candidate William Hood won the resulting by-election on 22 October 1898.
^{8} On 27 September 1898, Thomas Joseph Byrnes, the Premier and member for Warwick, died. Opposition candidate Arthur Morgan won the resulting by-election on 22 October 1898.
