= 1866 Mitchell colonial by-election =

The 1866 Mitchell colonial by-election was a by-election held on 22 February 1866 in the electoral district of Mitchell for the Queensland Legislative Assembly.

== History ==
On 1 January 1866, John Gore Jones, the member for Mitchell, resigned. Theodore Harden won the resulting by-election on 22 February 1866.

== See also ==
- Members of the Queensland Legislative Assembly, 1863–1867
