= 1863 Port Curtis colonial by-election =

| ← 1860 | May 12, 1863 | 1864 → |
| Candidate | John Douglas |
| Party | Independent |
Member for Port Curtis before election
Alfred Sandeman
Independent
Elected Member for Port Curtis
John Douglas
Independent

The 1863 Port Curtis colonial by-election was a by-election held on 12 May 1863 in the electoral district of Port Curtis for the Queensland Legislative Assembly.

== History ==
On 11 April 1863, Alfred Sandeman, the member for Port Curtis resigned due to complaints about his inactivity by his constituents. John Douglas won the resulting by-election on 12 May 1863.

== See also ==
- Members of the Queensland Legislative Assembly, 1860–1863
