= 1865 Mitchell colonial by-election =

The 1865 Mitchell colonial by-election was a by-election held on 25 March 1865 in the electoral district of Mitchell for the Queensland Legislative Assembly.

== History ==
Under the Additional Members Act 1864, the seats of Clermont, Kennedy, Maryborough, Mitchell, Rockhampton and Warrego were created. By-elections to fill the new seats were held on 1 February 1865 (Maryborough and Rockhampton), on 18 March 1865 (Clermont and Kennedy) and on 25 March 1865 (Mitchell and Warrego). John Gore Jones won in Mitchell.

== See also ==
- Members of the Queensland Legislative Assembly, 1863–1867
