= 1870 Mitchell colonial by-election =

The 1870 Mitchell colonial by-election was a by-election held on 8 February 1870 in the electoral district of Mitchell for the Queensland Legislative Assembly.

== History ==
On 3 December 1869, Edward Lamb, member for Mitchell, resigned. Archibald Buchanan won the resulting by-election on 8 February 1870; however, it emerged he had not nominated as a candidate and had been elected against his own wishes, and he resigned two days later.

== See also ==
- Members of the Queensland Legislative Assembly, 1868–1870
