= Members of the Queensland Legislative Assembly, 1878–1883 =

This is a list of members of the 8th Legislative Assembly of Queensland from 1878 to 1883, as elected at the 1878 colonial elections held between 14 November 1878 and 10 December 1878 (due to problems of distance and communications, it was not possible to hold the elections on a single day).

Name	Electorate	Term in office
Robert Aland^{[11]}	Drayton and Toowoomba	1881–1893
William Allan^{[17]}	Darling Downs	1881–1883; 1887–1896
Francis Amhurst^{[14]}	Mackay	1875–1877; 1878–1881
Archibald Archer	Blackall	1867–1869; 1878–1886; 1888–1896
William Bailey	Wide Bay	1873–1888
William Henry Baynes	Burnett	1878–1883
Frank Beattie^{[5]}	Fortitude Valley	1874–1878; 1879–1886
Joshua Peter Bell^{[4]}	Northern Downs	1862–1879
Henry Rogers Beor^{[8]}^{[12]}	Bowen	1877–1880
Maurice Hume Black^{[14]}	Mackay	1881–1993
William Brookes^{[18]}	North Brisbane	1863–1867; 1882–1888
John Buckland^{[22]}	Bulimba	1882–1892
Charles E. Chubb^{[24]}	Bowen	1883–1888
Frederick Cooper	Cook	1878–1884
Pope Alexander Cooper^{[12]}^{[24]}	Bowen	1881–1883
George Davenport^{[11]}	Drayton and Toowoomba	1878–1881
John Deane^{[1]}	Townsville	1878–1879
Oscar de Satge^{[13]}^{[21]}	Mitchell	1869–1870; 1870–1872; 1873–1877; 1881–1882
James Dickson	Enoggera	1873–1888; 1892–1901
John Douglas^{[10]}	Maryborough	1863–1866; 1867–1868; 1875–1880
Albrecht Feez^{[7]}	Leichhardt	1880–1883
John Ferguson^{[16]}	Rockhampton	1881–1888
James Foote^{[9]}	Bundamba	1873–1878; 1880–1888; 1892–1893
William Fowles^{[2]}	Clermont	1878–1879
Josiah Francis^{[15]}	Ipswich	1881–1883
Simon Fraser^{[6]}	South Brisbane	1868–1870; 1873–1878; 1880–1888
James Garrick	Moreton	1867–1868; 1877–1883
John Govett^{[21]}	Mitchell	1882–1888
Samuel Walker Griffith	North Brisbane	1872–1893
Samuel Grimes	Oxley	1878–1902
William Henry Groom	Drayton and Toowoomba	1862–1901
John Hamilton	Gympie	1878–1904
William Hendren^{[9]}	Bundamba	1878–1880
Charles Lumley Hill^{[20]}	Gregory	1878–1882; 1885–1888
Jacob Horwitz	Warwick	1878–1887
Jean Baptiste Louis Isambert^{[23]}	Rosewood	1882–1892
John Shillito Jessop^{[19]}	Dalby	1882–1893
Francis Benjamin Kates^{[17]}	Darling Downs	1878–1881; 1883–1888
William Kellett	Stanley	1878–1888
Henry Edward King	Maryborough	1870–1871; 1871–1873; 1874–1883
Richard Ash Kingsford	South Brisbane	1875–1883
James Lalor	Maranoa	1878–1888
Jacob Low	Balonne	1874–1883
Thomas MacDonald-Paterson	Rockhampton	1878–1885; 1896–1901
John MacFarlane	Ipswich	1878–1894
John MacFarlane^{[3]}^{[7]}	Leichhardt	1877–1878; 1879–1880
Thomas McIlwraith	Mulgrave	1870–1871; 1873–1886; 1888–1896
Angus Mackay^{[6]}	South Brisbane	1878–1880
Peter McLean	Logan	1876–1883
John Murtagh Macrossan^{[1]}	Townsville	1873–1878; 1879–1891
Thomas McWhannell^{[20]}	Gregory	1882–1888
Archibald Meston^{[23]}	Rosewood	1878–1882
William Miles	Darling Downs	1864–1873; 1874–1875; 1876–1887
Boyd Dunlop Morehead^{[13]}	Mitchell	1871–1880; 1883–1896
Albert Norton	Port Curtis	1878–1893
Patrick O'Sullivan	Stanley	1860–1863; 1867–1868; 1876–1883; 1888–1893
Arthur Hunter Palmer^{[18]}	North Brisbane	1866–1881
Henry Palmer^{[9]}	Maryborough	1880–1883
Henry Palmer	Kennedy	1878–1883
William Sheffield Paul^{[3]}	Leichhardt	1878–1879; 1888–1893
Patrick Perkins	Aubigny	1877–1884; 1888–1893
de Burgh Fitzpatrick Persse	Fassifern	1878–1883
Thomas Price	Wide Bay	1878–1883
Ratcliffe Pring^{[5]}	Fortitude Valley	1860–1862; 1863–1866; 1867–1872; 1873–1874; 1878–1879
William Rea^{[16]}	Rockhampton	1878–1881
Arthur Rutledge	Enoggera	1878–1893; 1899–1904
John Scott	Leichhardt	1868, 1870–1888
Roger Sheaffe	Burke	1878–1883
George Simpson^{[19]}	Dalby	1878–1882
Ernest James Stevens	Warrego	1878–1896
John Stevenson	Normanby	1876–1893
Francis Horace Stubley	Kennedy	1878–1883
Frederick ffoulkes Swanwick^{[22]}	Bulimba	1878–1882
John Malbon Thompson^{[M]}^{[15]}	Ipswich	1868–1881
George Thorn jnr^{[4]}	Northern Downs	1867–1874; 1876–1878; 1879–1883; 1887–1888; 1893–1902
John de Poix Tyrel	Carnarvon	1876–1883
John Walsh	Cook	1878–1883
Henry Joseph Weld-Blundell^{[2]}	Clermont	1879–1883

== See also ==
- Premier:

John Douglas (1877–1879)
Thomas McIlwraith (1879–1883)

== Notes ==
^{M} On 21 January 1879, following the defeat of the Douglas Ministry, the McIlwraith Ministry was sworn in. The Constitution required all of them to stand down and contest their parliamentary seats at ministerial by-elections. Only one of its members was opposed at election: John Malbon Thompson, the member for Ipswich, who was returned by a narrow majority at the poll on 1 February 1879 against James Foote.
^{1} On 3 February 1879, John Deane, the member for Townsville, resigned. John Murtagh Macrossan, who had already been appointed minister for works and mines in the McIlwraith Ministry, won the resulting by-election on 4 March 1879.
^{2} On 1 March 1879, William Fowles, the member for Clermont, resigned following his appointment as Registrar of the Supreme Court. Henry Joseph Weld-Blundell won the resulting by-election on 5 April 1879.
^{3} On 24 March 1879, William Sheffield Paul, the member for Leichhardt, resigned. John MacFarlane won the resulting by-election on 17 April 1879.
^{4} On 3 April 1879, Joshua Peter Bell, the member for Northern Downs, was appointed as President of the Queensland Legislative Council replacing Maurice O'Connell, who had died on 23 March. George Thorn won the resulting by-election on 17 April 1879.
^{5} On 16 May 1879, following a petition upon claims by William Bailey that the attorney-general and member for Fortitude Valley, Ratcliffe Pring, was engaging in legal services on behalf of the Crown for profit, his seat was vacated and a ministerial by-election announced. Pring was defeated by Frank Beattie at the by-election on 29 May 1879.
^{6} On 24 March 1880, Angus Mackay, member for South Brisbane, retired due to ill health and returned to Britain. Simon Fraser won the resulting by-election on 6 April 1880.
^{7} On 10 April 1880, John MacFarlane, the member for Leichhardt, died. Albrecht Feez won the resulting by-election on 6 May 1880.
^{8} On 4 June 1880, following the resignation of Ratcliffe Pring (who had not held a seat in either house since his defeat on 29 May 1879) as attorney-general, Henry Beor resigned and contested a ministerial by-election for his seat of Bowen on 29 June 1880, which he won.
^{9} On 26 October 1880, William Hendren, the member for Bundamba, resigned following his being declared insolvent. James Foote won the resulting by-election on 12 November 1880.
^{10} On 24 November 1880, John Douglas, the former premier and member for Maryborough, resigned. Henry Palmer won the resulting by-election on 13 December 1880.
^{11} On 1 January 1881, George Davenport, the member for Drayton and Toowoomba, died. Robert Aland won the resulting by-election on 14 January 1881.
^{12} On 25 December 1880, Henry Beor, the attorney-general and member for Bowen, died. Pope Alexander Cooper, who had been appointed his replacement as attorney-general, won the resulting by-election on 24 January 1881.
^{13} On 30 December 1880, Boyd Dunlop Morehead, the member for Mitchell, was appointed to the Queensland Legislative Council. Oscar de Satge won the resulting by-election on 3 February 1881.
^{14} On 3 January 1881, Francis Amhurst, the member for Mackay, died. Maurice Hume Black won the resulting by-election on 24 March 1881.
^{15} On 27 July 1881, John Malbon Thompson, the member for Ipswich, resigned. Josiah Francis won the resulting by-election on 8 August 1881.
^{16} On 21 September 1881, William Rea, the member for Rockhampton, died. John Ferguson won the resulting by-election on 8 October 1881.
^{17} On 1 November 1881, Francis Kates, the member for Darling Downs, resigned. William Allan won the resulting by-election on 29 November 1881.
^{18} On 24 December 1881, Arthur Hunter Palmer, the member for North Brisbane, was appointed as President of the Queensland Legislative Council, replacing Joshua Peter Bell, who had died on 20 December. William Brookes won the resulting by-election on 13 January 1882.
^{19} On 20 January 1882, George Simpson, the member for Dalby, resigned. John Jessop won the resulting by-election on 31 January 1882.
^{20} On 20 February 1882, Charles Lumley Hill, the member for Gregory, resigned. Thomas McWhannell won the resulting by-election on 21 March 1882.
^{21} On 5 April 1882, Oscar de Satge, the member for Mitchell, resigned. John Govett won the resulting by-election on 27 April 1882.
^{22} On 4 July 1882, Frederick Swanwick, the member for Bulimba, resigned. John Buckland won the resulting by-election on 13 July 1882.
^{23} On 4 July 1882, Archibald Meston, the member for Rosewood, resigned. Jean-Baptiste Isambert won the resulting by-election on 17 July 1882.
^{24} On 5 January 1883, Pope Alexander Cooper, the attorney-general member for Bowen, resigned. Charles E. Chubb, who had been appointed attorney-general on 6 January, won the resulting by-election on 18 January 1883.
