= 1864 Leichhardt colonial by-election =

By-election in Queensland

The 1864 Leichhardt colonial by-election was a by-election held on 14 April 1864 in the electoral district of Leichhardt for the Queensland Legislative Assembly.

== History ==
On 8 February 1864, Charles Royds, the member for Leichhardt, resigned. His brother Edmund Royds won the resulting by-election on 14 April 1864.

== See also ==
- Members of the Queensland Legislative Assembly, 1863–1867
