= 1867 Mitchell colonial by-election =

The 1867 Mitchell colonial by-election was a by-election held on 4 January 1867 in the electoral district of Mitchell for the Queensland Legislative Assembly.

== History ==
On 22 November 1866, Theodore Harden, the member for Mitchell, resigned. Edward Lamb won the resulting by-election on 4 January 1867.

== See also ==
- Members of the Queensland Legislative Assembly, 1863–1867
