= 1866 Port Curtis colonial by-election =

The 1866 Port Curtis colonial by-election was a by-election held on 19 March 1866 in the electoral district of Port Curtis for the Queensland Legislative Assembly.

== History ==
On 1 February 1866, John Douglas, the member for Port Curtis, was appointed as a minister. As such, he was required to resign and contest a ministerial by-election for his own seat. On 19 March 1866, he lost the by-election to Arthur Hunter Palmer.

== See also ==
- Members of the Queensland Legislative Assembly, 1863–1867
