= North Brisbane =

North Brisbane could mean the following:

- The part of Brisbane that is north of the Brisbane River (commonly known as the Northside)
- The Town of Brisbane, (pre 1925) to distinguish it from the separate Town of South Brisbane
- The Electoral district of North Brisbane, a district in the Legislative Assembly of Queensland from 1878 to 1888
- The Parish of North Brisbane, Queensland, a land administration unit covering the Brisbane CBD
- The Norths Devils, a rugby league team representing Brisbane's northern suburbs.
