= 1868 East Moreton colonial by-election =

The 1868 East Moreton colonial by-election was a by-election held on 23 December 1868 in the electoral district of East Moreton for the Queensland Legislative Assembly.

== History ==
On 11 December 1868, John Douglas, member for East Moreton, resigned. Henry Jordan won the resulting by-election on 23 December 1868.

== See also ==
- Members of the Queensland Legislative Assembly, 1868–1870
