= John Gore Jones =

Australian politician

John Jones

Member of the Queensland Legislative Assembly for Warwick
- In office 4 February 1862 – 10 June 1863
- Preceded by: St. George Gore
- Succeeded by: Arnold Wienholt, Sr.

Member of the Queensland Legislative Assembly for Mitchell
- In office 18 March 1865 – 1 January 1866
- Preceded by: New seat
- Succeeded by: Theodore Harden

Personal details
- Born: John Gore Jones; 1820 Sligo, Ireland
- Died: 27 February 1868 (aged 47–48) Brisbane, Australia
- Spouse: Elizabeth Gillman Nagle
- Education: Trinity College, Dublin
- Occupation: Barrister, Crown Prosecutor

John Gore Jones (1820–1868) was a politician in Queensland, Australia. He was a Member of the Queensland Legislative Assembly.

== Politics ==
On 14 January 1862, St. George Richard Gore, member for Warwick, resigned to contest a ministerial by-election after being made Secretary of Public Lands and Works. However, he was defeated by John Gore Jones who was elected at the resulting by-election on 4 February 1862. Jones held Warwick until 10 June 1863 (the 1863 election).

He contested the seats of Brisbane and West Moreton in the 1863 election but was unsuccessful.

Under the Additional Members Act 1864, six new electorates were created: Clermont, Kennedy, Maryborough, Mitchell, Rockhampton and Warrego. By-elections to fill the new seats were held on 1 February 1865 (Maryborough and Rockhampton), on 18 March 1865 (Clermont and Kennedy) and on 25 March 1865 (Mitchell and Warrego). Jones was elected in Mitchell on 18 March 1865 which he held until he resigned on 1 January 1866. Theodore Harden won the resulting by-election on 22 February 1866.

== See also ==
- Members of the Queensland Legislative Assembly, 1860–1863; 1863-1867

Parliament of Queensland
Preceded by St. George Gore	Member for Warwick; 1862–1863	Succeeded by Arnold Wienholt, Sr.
New seat	Member for Mitchell; 1865–1866	Succeeded by Theodore Harden
