= 1861 Port Curtis colonial by-election =

The 1861 Port Curtis colonial by-election was a by-election held on 15 October 1861 in the electoral district of Port Curtis for the Queensland Legislative Assembly.

== History ==
On 3 September 1861, Charles Fitzsimmons, the member for Port Curtis, resigned. Alfred Sandeman won the resulting by-election on 15 October 1861.

== See also ==
- Members of the Queensland Legislative Assembly, 1860–1863
