= 1862 Eastern Downs colonial by-election =

The 1862 Eastern Downs colonial by-election was a by-election held on 2 May 1862 in the electoral district of Eastern Downs for the Queensland Legislative Assembly.

== History ==
On 22 April 1862, Ratcliffe Pring, the member for Eastern Downs, resigned. John Donald McLean won the resulting by-election on 2 May 1862.

== See also ==
- Members of the Queensland Legislative Assembly, 1860–1863
