= 1868 Leichhardt colonial by-election =

The 1868 Leichhardt colonial by-election was a by-election held on 29 June 1868 in the electoral district of Leichhardt for the Queensland Legislative Assembly.

== History ==
On 11 May 1868, Edmund Royds, the member for Leichhardt, resigned. Edmund's brother, Charles Royds, won the resulting by-election on 29 June 1868.

== See also ==
- Members of the Queensland Legislative Assembly, 1867–1868
