= 1870 West Moreton colonial by-election =

The 1870 West Moreton colonial by-election was a by-election held on 25 June 1870 in the electoral district of West Moreton for the Queensland Legislative Assembly.

== History ==
On 13 June 1870, Samuel Hodgson, member for West Moreton, resigned. John Ferrett won the resulting by-election on 25 June 1870.

== See also ==
- Members of the Queensland Legislative Assembly, 1868–1870
