= 1864 Town of Brisbane colonial by-election =

The 1864 Town of Brisbane colonial by-election was a by-election held on 22 April 1864 in the electoral district of Town of Brisbane for the Queensland Legislative Assembly.

== History ==
On 8 April 1864, George Raff, member for Town of Brisbane, resigned. William Brookes won the resulting by-election on 22 April 1864.

== See also ==
- Members of the Queensland Legislative Assembly, 1863–1867
