= 1869 Town of Brisbane colonial by-election =

The 1869 Town of Brisbane colonial by-election was a by-election held on 10 February 1869 in the electoral district of Town of Brisbane for the Queensland Legislative Assembly.

== History ==
On 30 January 1869, Theophilus Parsons Pugh, member for Town of Brisbane, resigned. George Edmondstone was elected unopposed at the resulting by-election on 10 February 1869.

== See also ==
- Members of the Queensland Legislative Assembly, 1868–1870
