= 1863 East Moreton colonial by-election =

The 1863 East Moreton colonial by-election was a by-election held on 26 September 1863 in the electoral district of East Moreton for the Queensland Legislative Assembly.

== History ==
On 15 September 1863, upon a successful petition by Robert Cribb on the basis that printed lines on the ballot paper misled voters, the election in East Moreton was declared void. The election was re-run on 26 September 1863, and William Brookes lost his seat to Cribb, whilst George Edmondstone retained his.

== See also ==
- Members of the Queensland Legislative Assembly, 1863–1867
