= 1868 Queensland colonial election =

Elections were held in the Australian state of Queensland between 14 September 1868 and 6 October 1868 to elect the members of the colony's Legislative Assembly.

== Key dates ==
Due to problems of distance and communications, it was not possible to hold the elections on a single day.

== See also ==
- Members of the Queensland Legislative Assembly, 1868–1870
