= 1870 Warrego colonial by-election =

The 1870 Warrego colonial by-election was a by-election held on 5 January 1870 in the electoral district of Warrego for the Queensland Legislative Assembly.

== History ==
On 23 November 1869, Arthur Hodgson, the member for Warrego, resigned. Thomas McIlwraith won the resulting by-election on 5 January 1870.

== See also ==
- Members of the Queensland Legislative Assembly, 1868–1870
