= 1869 Rockhampton colonial by-election =

The 1869 Rockhampton colonial by-election was a by-election held on 6 December 1869 in the electoral district of Rockhampton for the Queensland Legislative Assembly.

== History ==
On 19 November 1869, Archibald Archer, member for Rockhampton, resigned. Henry Milford won the resulting by-election on 6 December 1869, but did not take his seat in parliament.

Eventually this triggered another by-election in June 1870; although Milford contested this by-election, he was defeated by Alexander Fyfe.

== See also ==
- Members of the Queensland Legislative Assembly, 1868–1870
