= May 1861 West Moreton colonial by-election =

The West Moreton colonial by-election, May 1861 was a by-election held on 31 May 1861 in the electoral district of West Moreton for the Queensland Legislative Assembly.

== History ==
On 16 May 1861, Henry Challinor, the member for West Moreton, resigned. He was re-elected at the resulting by-election on 31 May 1861.

== See also ==
- Members of the Queensland Legislative Assembly, 1860–1863
