= Members of the Queensland Legislative Assembly =

This is a list of members of the Legislative Assembly of Queensland, the state parliament of Queensland, sorted by parliament.

- 1860–1863
- 1863–1867
- 1867–1868
- 1868–1870
- 1870–1871
- 1871–1873
- 1873–1878
- 1878–1883
- 1883–1888
- 1888–1893
- 1893–1896
- 1896–1899
- 1899–1902
- 1902–1904
- 1904–1907
- 1907–1908
- 1908–1909
- 1909–1912
- 1912–1915
- 1915–1918
- 1918–1920
- 1920–1923
- 1923–1926
- 1926–1929
- 1929–1932
- 1932–1935
- 1935–1938
- 1938–1941
- 1941–1944
- 1944–1947
- 1947–1950
- 1950–1953
- 1953–1956
- 1956–1957
- 1957–1960
- 1960–1963
- 1963–1966
- 1966–1969
- 1969–1972
- 1972–1974
- 1974–1977
- 1977–1980
- 1980–1983
- 1983–1986
- 1986–1989
- 1989–1992
- 1992–1995
- 1995–1998
- 1998–2001
- 2001–2004
- 2004–2006
- 2006–2009
- 2009–2012
- 2012–2015
- 2015–2017
- 2017–2020
- 2020–2024
- 2024–2028

== See also ==
- Queensland Legislative Assembly electoral districts
