= 1870 Clermont colonial by-election =

The 1870 Clermont colonial by-election was a by-election held on 4 May 1870 in the electoral district of Clermont for the Queensland Legislative Assembly.

== History ==
On 4 April 1870, Oscar de Satge, member for the Clermont resigned. John Robinson Benson won the resulting by-election on 4 May 1870.

== See also ==
- Members of the Queensland Legislative Assembly, 1868–1870
