= 1865 Town of Brisbane colonial by-election =

The 1865 Town of Brisbane colonial by-election was a by-election held on 23 November 1865 in the electoral district of Town of Brisbane for the Queensland Legislative Assembly.

== History ==
In November 1865, Charles Blakeney, member for Town of Brisbane, resigned, having accepted an appointment as a District Court judge in the Western District. George Raff won the resulting by-election unopposed on 23 November 1865.

== See also ==
- Members of the Queensland Legislative Assembly, 1863–1867
