= 1860 East Moreton colonial by-election =

The 1860 East Moreton colonial by-election was a by-election held on 27 October 1860 in the electoral district of East Moreton for the Queensland Legislative Assembly.

== History ==
On 29 September 1860, Henry Buckley, member for East Moreton, resigned. Thomas Symes Warry won the resulting by-election on 27 October 1860.

== See also ==
- Members of the Queensland Legislative Assembly, 1860–1863
