= 1862 Drayton and Toowoomba colonial by-election =

The 1862 Drayton and Toowoomba colonial by-election was a by-election held on 11 August 1862 in the electoral district of Drayton and Toowoomba for the Queensland Legislative Assembly.

== History ==
On 26 July 1862, John Watts, the member for Drayton and Toowoomba, resigned. William Henry Groom won the resulting by-election on 11 August 1862.

== See also ==
- Members of the Queensland Legislative Assembly, 1860–1863
