= 1869 Kennedy colonial by-election =

Queensland legislative by-election

The 1869 Kennedy colonial by-election was a by-election held on 10 July 1869 in the electoral district of Kennedy for the Queensland Legislative Assembly.

== History ==
On 11 June 1869, Thomas Henry FitzGerald, member for Kennedy, resigned. Rt Hon John Bright, an English Radical politician, was nominated as a form of protest, and won the resulting by-election on 10 July 1869. He never took his seat in the Queensland Parliament; indeed it is unknown if he knew he was either nominated or elected.

== See also ==
- Members of the Queensland Legislative Assembly, 1868–1870
