= 1860 Town of Brisbane colonial by-election =

The 1860 Town of Brisbane colonial by-election was a by-election held on 8 December 1860 in the electoral district of Town of Brisbane for the Queensland Legislative Assembly.

== History ==
On 17 October 1860, Henry Jordan, member for Town of Brisbane, resigned. Robert Cribb won the resulting by-election on 8 December 1860.

== See also ==
- Members of the Queensland Legislative Assembly, 1860–1863
