= January 1861 West Moreton colonial by-election =

The West Moreton colonial by-election, January 1861 was a by-election held on 12 January 1861 in the electoral district of West Moreton for the Queensland Legislative Assembly.

== History ==
On 21 December 1860, Alfred Broughton, member for West Moreton, resigned. Henry Challinor won the resulting by-election on 12 January 1861.

== See also ==
- Members of the Queensland Legislative Assembly, 1860–1863
