= 1870 East Moreton colonial by-election =

The 1870 East Moreton colonial by-election was a by-election held on 19 February 1870 in the electoral district of East Moreton for the Queensland Legislative Assembly.

== History ==
On 17 February 1870, Arthur Francis, member for East Moreton, resigned due to insolvency. On the nomination day for the by-election, 19 February 1870, there were two candidatesRobert Travers Atkin and Robert Cribb (who had previously represented the electorate from 1863 to 1867). In his nomination speech, Atkin made accusations against Cribb, who replied vigorously defending himself. The somewhat unexpected outcome of this verbal exchange was that Cribb announced he would withdraw his nomination. Cribb said that if Atkin believed he could represent them so well, the best thing they could do would be to let him try, predicting that Atkin would either resign or be asked to resign within six months. Being the only remaining candidate, Atkin was declared elected.

Cribb's six-month prediction did not come true. However, Atkin did not complete his term, as he resigned on 7 March 1872 due to serious ill health (pulmonary tuberculosis) and died soon after.

== See also ==
- Members of the Queensland Legislative Assembly, 1868–1870
