= 1862 Warwick colonial by-election =

By-election

The 1862 Warwick colonial by-election was a by-election held on 4 February 1862 in the electoral district of Warwick for the Queensland Legislative Assembly.

== History ==
On 14 January 1862, St. George Richard Gore, member for Warwick, resigned to contest a ministerial by-election after being made Secretary of Public Lands and Works. He was defeated by John Gore Jones at the resulting by-election on 4 February 1862.

== See also ==
- Members of the Queensland Legislative Assembly, 1860–1863
