= 1870 Rockhampton colonial by-election =

By-election in Queensland, Australia

The 1870 Rockhampton colonial by-election was a by-election held on 20 June 1870 in the electoral district of Rockhampton for the Queensland Legislative Assembly.

== History ==
On 7 June 1870, Henry Milford, member for Rockhampton since the by-election in December 1869, resigned, having never taken his seat in Parliament. Milford contested the resulting by-election on 20 June 1870, but was defeated by Alexander Fyfe.

== See also ==
- Members of the Queensland Legislative Assembly, 1868–1870
