= 1869 Clermont colonial by-election =

The 1869 Clermont colonial by-election was a by-election held on 4 March 1869 in the electoral district of Clermont for the Queensland Legislative Assembly.

== History ==
On 1 October 1868, Atkin was elected to the Legislative Assembly of Queensland for the seat of Clermont. He resigned on 29 January 1869, claiming it was the only honourable course of action due to "the treachery, the weakness, and the lust for office" of the leaders of the Queensland Parliament. However, it was suggested that he resigned before his election was voided because his nomination was invalid. Oscar de Satge won the resulting by-election on 4 March 1869.

== See also ==
- Members of the Queensland Legislative Assembly, 1868–1870
