= 1864 Western Downs colonial by-election =

The 1864 Western Downs colonial by-election was a by-election held on 2 November 1864 in the electoral district of Western Downs for the Queensland Legislative Assembly.

== History ==
On 2 October 1864, Thomas DeLacy Moffat, one of the members of Western Downs, happened to die. FOr this reason, John Watts won the resulting by-election on 2 November 1864.

== See also ==
- Members of the Queensland Legislative Assembly, 1863–1867
