= 1864 Maranoa colonial by-election =

The 1864 Maranoa colonial by-election was a by-election held on 27 September 1864 in the electoral district of Maranoa for the Queensland Legislative Assembly.

== History ==
On 28 July 1864, William Kennedy, the member for Maranoa, was unseated by the Elections and Qualifications Committee. William Miles won the resulting by-election on 27 September 1864.

== See also ==
- Members of the Queensland Legislative Assembly, 1863–1867
