= Edmund Royds (Queensland politician) =

Australian politician

Member of the Queensland Legislative Assembly for Leichhardt
- In office 14 April 1864 – 11 May 1868
- Preceded by: Charles Royds
- Succeeded by: Charles Royds
- In office 20 February 1872 – 8 December 1875
- Preceded by: Charles Royds
- Succeeded by: Charles Haly

Personal details
- Born: Edmund Molyneux Royds; 26 December 1830 Brereton, Cheshire, England
- Died: 26 February 1918 (aged 87) Torquay, England
- Occupation: Station Lessee

Edmund Molyneux Royds (1830–1918) was a politician in Queensland, Australia. He was a Member of the Queensland Legislative Assembly.

== Politics ==
On 8 February 1864, Charles Royds, the Member for the electoral district of Leichhardt resigned and his brother Edmund Royds won the resulting by-election on 14 April 1864. On 11 May 1868, Edmund Royds resigned the seat, and his brother Charles won the resulting by-election in Leichhardt on 29 June 1868.

On 30 January 1872, Charles Royds resigned, and Edmund won the resulting by-election in Leichhardt on 20 February 1872. He held the seat until he resigned on 8 December 1875. Charles Haly won the resulting by-election on 12 January 1876.

== See also ==
- Members of the Queensland Legislative Assembly, 1863–1867; 1867–1868; 1871–1873; 1873–1878

Parliament of Queensland
Preceded by Charles Royds	Member for Leichhardt; 1864–1868	Succeeded by Charles Royds
Preceded by Charles Royds	Member for Leichhardt; 1872–1875	Succeeded by Charles Haly
