= 1867 Rockhampton colonial by-election =

The 1867 Rockhampton colonial by-election was a by-election held on 27 July 1867 in the electoral district of Rockhampton for the Queensland Legislative Assembly.

== History ==
At the 1867 general election, Thomas Henry Fitzgerald stood as a candidate two seats: Rockhampton and Kennedy. Having won Rockhampton on 27 June, he decided that he would prefer to try to win in Kennedy on 19 July and so immediately resigned Rockhampton. Archibald Archer was returned unopposed in the by-election in Rockhampton on 27 July 1867. (Fitzgerald was successful in winning Kennedy on 19 July 1867.)

== See also ==
- Members of the Queensland Legislative Assembly, 1867–1868
