= William Hood (politician) =

Australian politician

Member of the Queensland Legislative Assembly for Warrego
- In office 22 October 1898 – 21 November 1899
- Preceded by: James Crombie
- Succeeded by: David Bowman

Personal details
- Born: William Walter Hood; 25 March 1844 Berwick, Scotland
- Died: 18 August 1920 (aged 76) Brisbane, Queensland, Australia
- Resting place: Toowong Cemetery
- Party: Ministerialist
- Spouse: Mary Jane Sceales (m.1868 d.1902)
- Occupation: Company director

William Walter Hood (25 March 1844 – 18 August 1920) was a member of the Queensland Legislative Assembly.

== Biography ==
Hood was born in Berwick, Scotland, the son of Robert Hood and his wife Margaret (née Weatherly). Upon his arrival in Australia he was educated at the Geelong Grammar School and after receiving commercial experience in Melbourne he set out to Queensland in 1863. Here he first worked at several stations before becoming the general manager of the Queensland Pastoral Company in 1880 and a company director of the Queensland Cattle Company, the Queensland Investment Company, and the West Qld Pastoralists' Company.

On 11 February 1868 Hood married Mary Jane Sceales (died 1902) and together had six sons and nine daughters. He died in August 1920 and was buried in the Toowong Cemetery.

== Public career ==
Hood's first experience as a politician was with the Ararat Shire Council in Victoria. Following the death of the sitting member, James Crombie in 1898, Hood won the subsequent by-election for the seat of Warrego in the Queensland Legislative Assembly. The election of Hood at the 1899 Queensland colonial election was declared void in November of that year and another by-election was held the following month which was won by Labour's David Bowman.

Parliament of Queensland
Preceded by James Crombie	Member for Warrego; 1898–1899	Succeeded by David Bowman
