= 1868 Clermont colonial by-election =

The 1868 Clermont colonial by-election was a by-election held on 22 June 1868 in the electoral district of Clermont for the Queensland Legislative Assembly.

== History ==
On 11 May 1868, Charles Fitzsimmons, the member for Clermont, resigned. John Scott won the resulting by-election on 22 June 1868.

== See also ==
- Members of the Queensland Legislative Assembly, 1867–1868
