= Charles Royds (politician) =

Australian politician

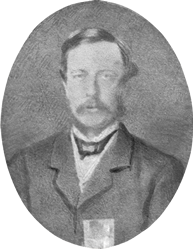

Member of the Queensland Legislative Assembly for Leichhardt
- In office 4 May 1860 – 8 February 1864 Serving with Robert Herbert, Gordon Sandeman
- Preceded by: New seat
- Succeeded by: Edmund Royds
- In office 29 June 1868 – 30 January 1872 Serving with John Scott, Gordon Sandeman
- Preceded by: Edmund Royds
- Succeeded by: Edmund Royds

Personal details
- Born: Charles James Royds; 26 August 1827 Brereton, Cheshire, England
- Died: 15 July 1898 (aged 70) Stevenage, Hertfordshire, England
- Occupation: Station Lessee

Charles James Royds (1827–1898) was a pastoralist and politician in Queensland, Australia. He was a Member of the Queensland Legislative Assembly.

== Politics ==
Charles Royds was elected to the Queensland Legislative Assembly in the electoral district of Leichhardt on 4 May 1860 (the 1860 Queensland colonial election). On 8 February 1864, Charles Royds resigned and his brother Edmund Royds won the resulting by-election on 14 April 1864.

On 11 May 1868, his brother Edmund Royds resigned the seat and Charles Royd won the resulting by-election in Leichhardt on 29 June 1868. Charles Royds held the seat until 30 January 1872 when he resigned. His brother Edmund Royds won the resulting by-election on 20 February 1872.

== Later life ==
Royds died on 15 July 1898 at Stevenage, Hertfordshire, England aged 70 years.

== See also ==
- Members of the Queensland Legislative Assembly, 1860–1863; 1863–67; 1867–68; 1868–70; 1870–71; 1871–73

Parliament of Queensland
New seat	Member for Leichhardt; 1860–1864; Served alongside: Robert Herbert, Gordon Sandeman	Succeeded by Edmund Royds
Preceded by Edmund Royds	Member for Leichhardt; 1868–1872; Served alongside: John Scott, Gordon Sandeman	Succeeded by Edmund Royds
