= John Govett =

Australian politician

John Govett (1832 – 7 December 1920) was a politician in Queensland, Australia. He was a Member of the Queensland Legislative Assembly, representing Mitchell from 1882 to 1888.
