= 1863 Queensland colonial election =

Elections were held in the Australian state of Queensland between 30 May 1863 and 27 June 1863 to elect the members of the state's Legislative Assembly.

== Key dates ==
Due to problems of distance and communications, the elections could not be held on a single day.

== See also ==
- Members of the Queensland Legislative Assembly, 1863–1867
