= Archibald Berdmore Buchanan =

Australian politician

Archibald Buchanan
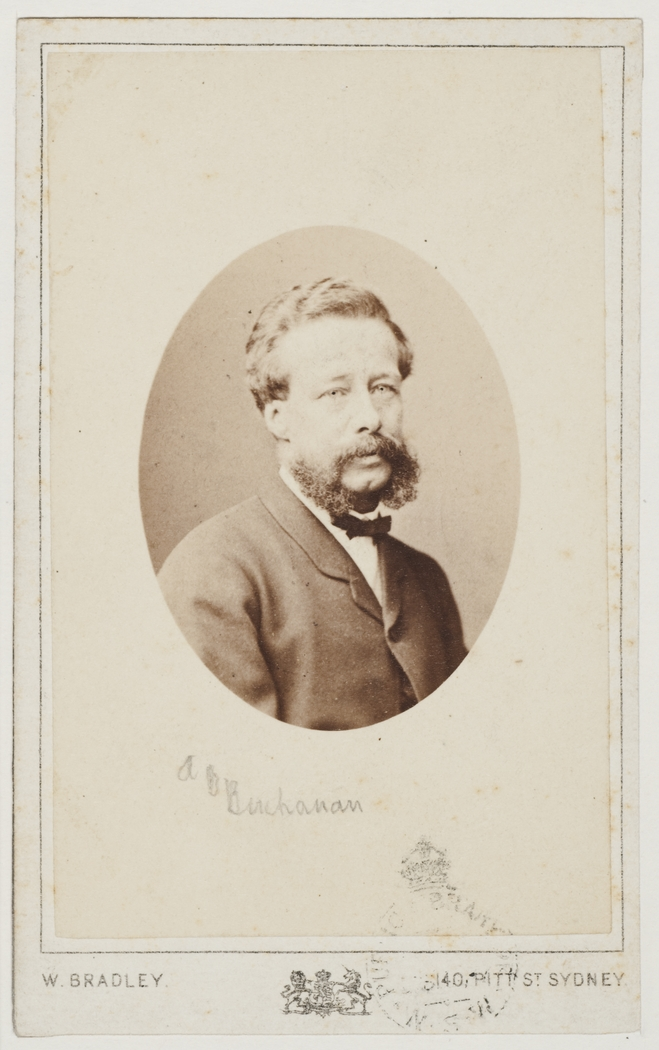

Member of the Queensland Legislative Assembly for Mitchell
- In office 8 February 1870 – 14 February 1870
- Preceded by: Edward Lamb
- Succeeded by: John Handy

Member of the Queensland Legislative Assembly for Warrego
- In office 9 September 1871 – 1 December 1873
- Preceded by: Thomas McIlwraith
- Succeeded by: William Walsh

Member of the Queensland Legislative Council
- In office 2 January 1874 – 6 June 1878

Personal details
- Born: Archibald Berdmore Brine Buchanan; 9 January 1823 London, England
- Died: 30 March 1883 (aged 60) Rome, Italy
- Occupation: Pastoralist, Company director

Archibald Berdmore Brine Buchanan (9 January 1823 – 30 March 1883) was both a member of the Queensland Legislative Council and the Queensland Legislative Assembly.

== Early life ==
Buchanan was born in London, England in 1823 to William and Charlotte Buchanan. On his arrival in Australia, He became a partner in a general store in Taradale, Victoria before moving to Queensland and leasing Chinchilla and Wongongera stations on the Darling Downs. In the early 1870s he became a director at Queensland National Bank.

== Politics ==
Entering politics in 1870, Buchanan won the seat of Mitchell but resigned after being a member for only six or seven days. In 1871, Buchanan won the seat of Warrego, and remained in the position for two years.

In 1874, Buchanan was appointed to the Queensland Legislative Council. Buchanan held the seat until 1878.

== Later life ==
After resigning his seat in the council, Buchanan he left for England to establish the London branch of the Queensland National Bank. He did not return to Queensland, dying in Rome, Italy, on 30 March 1883.

Parliament of Queensland
Preceded by Edward Lamb	Member for Mitchell; 1870	Succeeded by John Handy
Preceded by Thomas McIlwraith	Member for Warrego; 1871–1873	Succeeded by William Walsh
