= Electoral district of North Brisbane =

Former electoral district of Queensland

North Brisbane Queensland—Legislative Assembly
- State: Queensland
- Created: 1878
- Abolished: 1888

North Brisbane was an electoral district of the Legislative Assembly in the Australian colony of Queensland from 1878 to 1888.

North Brisbane was a two-member constituency, created in 1878 by a merger of Brisbane City with one member and Wickham also with one member.

It was replaced/renamed by Brisbane North in 1888.

== Members for North Brisbane ==
Member 1	Party	Term	Member 2	Party	Term
Samuel Walker Griffith	Unaligned	1878–1888	Arthur Hunter Palmer	Unaligned	1878–1881
Samuel Walker Griffith	Unaligned	1878–1888	William Brookes	Unaligned	1882–1888

== See also ==
- Electoral districts of Queensland
- Members of the Queensland Legislative Assembly by year
- Category:Members of the Queensland Legislative Assembly by name
