= Arthur Hunter Palmer =

19th-century Australian politician

The Honourable Sir Arthur Hunter Palmer KCMG
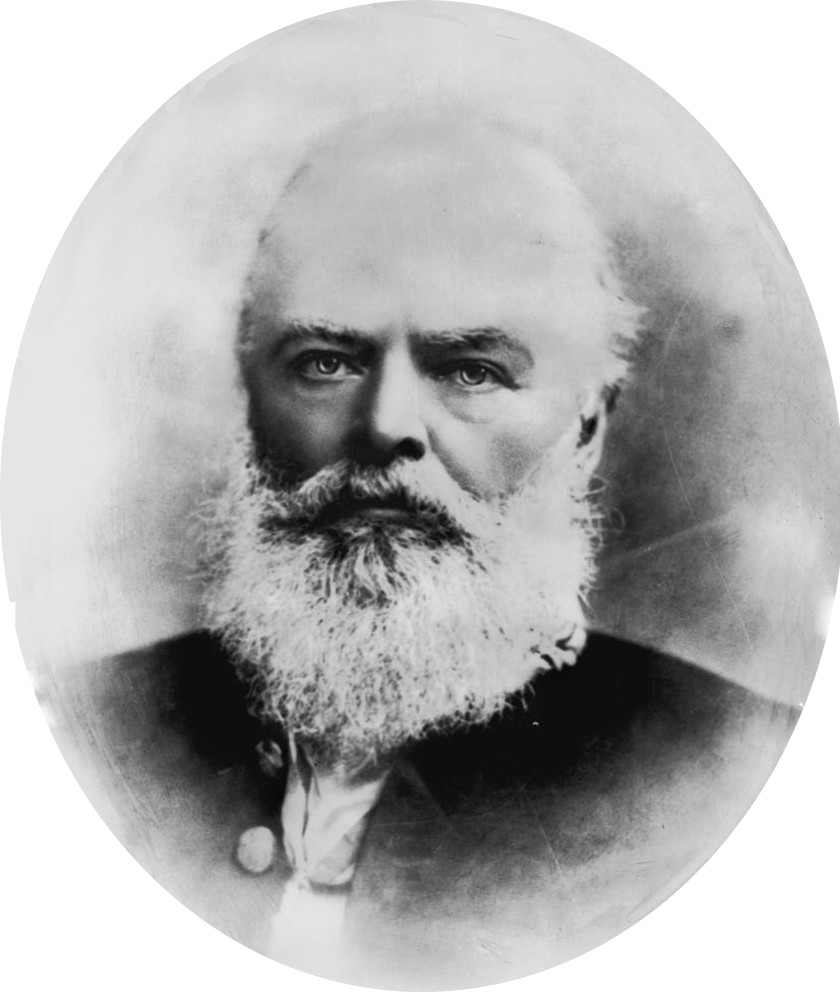

5th Premier of Queensland
- In office 3 May 1870 – 7 January 1874
- Preceded by: Charles Lilley
- Succeeded by: Arthur Macalister
- Constituency: Port Curtis

Member of the Queensland Legislative Assembly for Port Curtis
- In office 19 March 1866 – 14 November 1878
- Preceded by: John Douglas
- Succeeded by: Albert Norton

Member of the Queensland Legislative Assembly for North Brisbane
- In office 15 November 1878 – 24 December 1881 Serving with Samuel Griffith
- Preceded by: New seat
- Succeeded by: William Brookes

Member of the Queensland Legislative Council
- In office 24 December 1881 – 20 March 1898

Personal details
- Born: 28 December 1819 Armagh, County Armagh, Ireland, UK
- Died: 20 March 1898 (aged 78) Toowong, Brisbane, Queensland
- Resting place: Toowong Cemetery
- Spouse: Cecilia Jessie Mosman (d. 1885)
- Relations: Hugh Mosman (brother-in-law), Henry Palmer (brother)

Sir Arthur Hunter Palmer KCMG (28 December 1819 – 20 March 1898) was an Australian politician who served as the fifth Premier of Queensland, in office from 1870 to 1874. He later held ministerial office in Thomas McIlwraith's ministry from 1879 to 1881, before serving as President of the Queensland Legislative Council from 1881 until his death in 1898.

== Early life ==
Palmer was born on 28 December 1819 in Armagh, Ireland. His parents were Lieutenant Arthur Palmer, RN, and his wife, Emily (née Hunter).

Palmer attended Youghal Grammar School and was taught by a private tutor in Dublin. In 1838 he emigrated to New South Wales, arriving in Sydney on the City of Edinburgh. Palmer worked for many years for Henry Cary Dangar on his New England stations, eventually becoming general manager of all Dangar's holdings. Palmer went to Queensland and took up pastoral runs in the Belyando River valley which he called Beaufort Station. He began acting as a magistrate in 1865.

== Politics ==
In 1866, Palmer was elected to Parliament as member for Port Curtis in the Legislative Assembly of Queensland. Palmer's ministry was defeated on 6 January 1874. According to the Australian Dictionary of Biography, "Palmer cannot be said to have been instrumental in producing much legislation". However, his ministry was known for his cohesiveness, an atypical quality in the colonial period, and it survived two general elections. During an economic depression in 1870, Palmer authorised a civil-service retrenchment, which proved unpopular. Successful bills included the Electoral Redistribution Act, which divided the colony into single-member electoral districts based on population, and the Homestead Areas Act, which divided large pastoral leases into smaller areas of land.

Palmer became Colonial Secretary and Secretary for Public Instruction in January 1879. On 24 December 1881 he became President of the Queensland Legislative Council, a position that he retained until his death.

Palmer served as Administrator (deputy to the Governor) from 2 May 1883 to 6 November 1883, from 20 April 1886 to 12 December 1886, from 9 October 1888 to 1 May 1889, and from 16 November 1890 to 6 May 1891. He also served as Lieutenant-Governor of Queensland from 15 November 1895 to 9 April 1896.

== Later life ==
He died at Easton Gray, his home in Toowong, Queensland after a long illness and was buried in Toowong Cemetery.

== Family ==
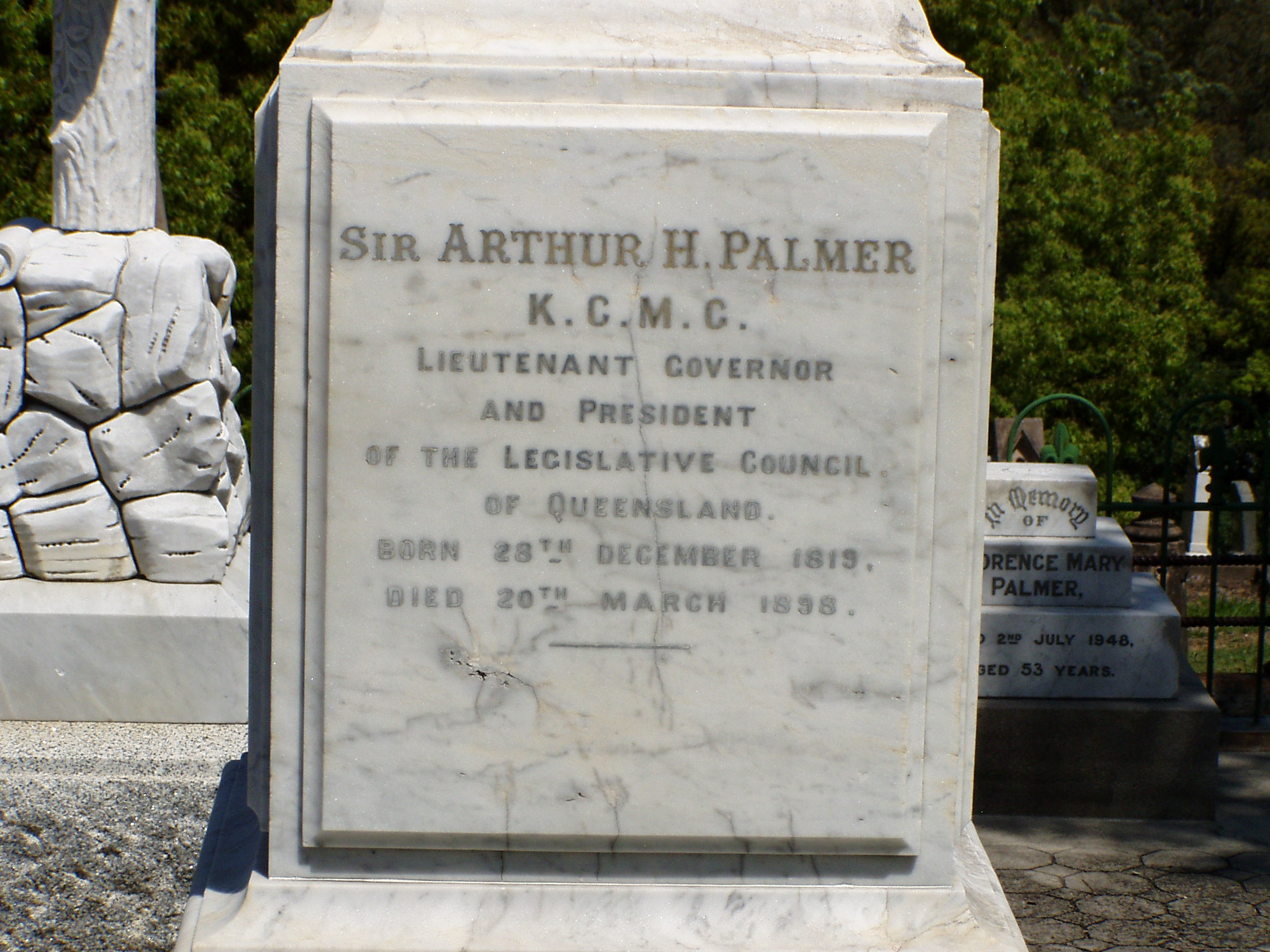
Sir Arthur Hunter Palmer's headstone at Brisbane's Toowong Cemetery

In 1865, Palmer married Miss Cecilia Jessie Mosman. Cecilia was the sister of Hugh Mosman who discovered gold in Charters Towers and of Harriette Mosman, the second wife of Queensland Premier Thomas McIlwraith. From 1872 to 1877, the Palmer family leased the house Fernberg in Paddington, which became Queensland's Government House in 1910. Cecilia died in 1885, and was survived by three sons and two daughters.

The family home, Easton Gray, was sold in 1944 for the construction of Toowong State High School, later Toowong College, and now the Queensland Academy for Science, Mathematics and Technology.

His grandson Beaufort Palmer was one of Australia's finest pilot instructors in World War II.

== Honours ==
Palmer was awarded a KCMG in 1881.

== See also ==
- Members of the Queensland Legislative Assembly, 1863–1867; 1867–1868; 1868–1870; 1870–1871; 1871–1873; 1873–1878; 1878–1883
- Members of the Queensland Legislative Council, 1880–1889; 1890–1899

== Sources ==
- Serle, Percival (1949). "Palmer, Arthur Hunter". Dictionary of Australian Biography. Sydney: Angus & Robertson.
- Carlyle, Edward Irving (1901). "Palmer, Arthur Hunter" . In Lee, Sidney (ed.). Dictionary of National Biography (1st supplement). London: Smith, Elder & Co.

Political offices
Preceded by Charles Lilley	Premier of Queensland; 1870–1874	Succeeded by Arthur Macalister
Parliament of Queensland
Preceded by John Douglas	Member for Port Curtis; 1866–1878	Succeeded by Albert Norton
New seat	Member for North Brisbane; 1878–1881; Served alongside: Samuel Griffith	Succeeded by William Brookes
