= John Douglas (Queensland politician) =

Australian politician (1828–1904)

The Hon John Douglas CMG
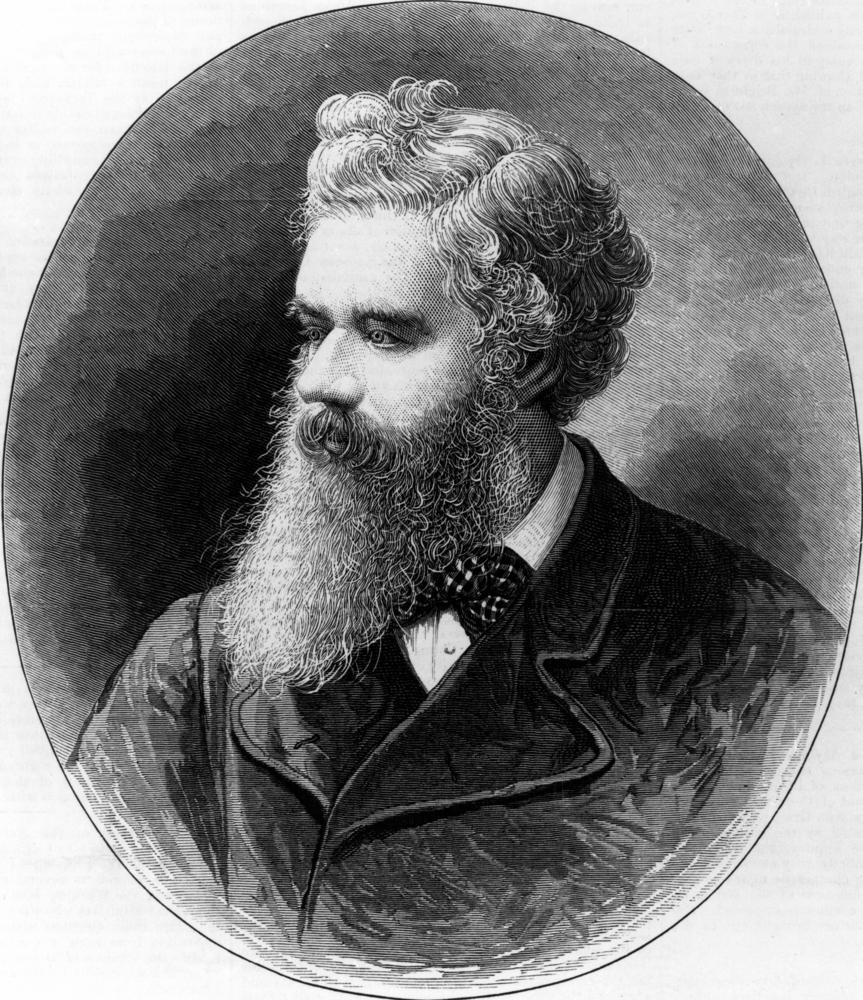

7th Premier of Queensland
- In office 8 March 1877 – 21 January 1879
- Preceded by: George Thorn
- Succeeded by: Thomas McIlwraith
- Constituency: Maryborough

5th Treasurer of Queensland
- In office 19 December 1866 – 21 May 1867
- Preceded by: John Donald McLean
- Succeeded by: Thomas Blacket Stephens
- Constituency: Eastern Downs

Member of the New South Wales Legislative Assembly for Darling Downs
- In office 5 July 1859 – 10 December 1859 Serving with William Handcock
- Preceded by: William Wild
- Succeeded by: David Bell

Member of the New South Wales Legislative Assembly for Camden
- In office 21 December 1860 – 17 July 1861
- Preceded by: William Wild
- Succeeded by: David Bell

Member of the Queensland Legislative Assembly for Port Curtis
- In office 14 June 1863 – 1 February 1866
- Preceded by: Alfred Sandeman
- Succeeded by: Arthur Palmer

Member of the Queensland Legislative Assembly for Eastern Downs
- In office 4 January 1867 – 18 September 1868
- Preceded by: John Donald McLean
- Succeeded by: Arthur Macalister

Member of the Queensland Legislative Assembly for East Moreton
- In office 28 September 1868 – 16 December 1868 Serving with Arthur Francis
- Preceded by: James Garrick
- Succeeded by: Henry Jordan

Member of the Queensland Legislative Assembly for Maryborough
- In office 27 April 1875 – 24 November 1880 Serving with Henry King
- Preceded by: Berkeley Basil Moreton
- Succeeded by: Henry Palmer

Member of the Queensland Legislative Council
- In office 22 February 1866 – 25 July 1866
- In office 11 December 1868 – 13 November 1869

Personal details
- Born: 6 March 1828 London, England, UK (United Kingdom)
- Died: 23 July 1904 (aged 76) Thursday Island, Queensland, Australia
- Spouse(s): Mary Ann Howe; Sarah Hickey
- Relations: Henry Douglas (son), Alex Douglas (great grandson)
- Occupation: Civil Servant

John Douglas CMG (6 March 1828 – 23 July 1904) was an Anglo-Australian politician and Premier of Queensland.

== Early life ==
Douglas was born in London, the seventh son of Henry Alexander Douglas and his wife Elizabeth Dalzell, daughter of the Earl of Carnwath. His father, the third son of Sir William Douglas, 4th Baronet of Kelhead, was a brother of the sixth and seventh Marquesses of Queensberry. Douglas' father died in 1837 and his mother in 1833 (burial records of the church of St Mary-Le-Bone, London), he was educated at Edinburgh Academy, Rugby 1843–47 and Durham University where he graduated B.A. in 1850.

== Politics ==
He was elected for the Darling Downs and for Camden in the New South Wales Legislative Assembly until resigning on 17 July 1861. He moved to Queensland in 1863.

On 12 May 1863 he was elected as member for Port Curtis in the Legislative Assembly of Queensland. He resigned on 1 February 1866, in order to be appointed on to the Queensland Legislative Council, which occurred on 22 February 1866.

In 1871 Douglas returned to Queensland and became insolvent on 23 February 1872. Lewis Adolphus Bernays claimed Douglas had more success as a clever political wire-puller behind the scenes than he had in parliament.

=== Later life ===
In 1865 Augustus Charles Gregory, Maurice Charles O'Connell and Douglas applied for a special grant of land to erect a Masonic Hall in Brisbane. This was granted on 15 January 1865.

In 1882 he was elected president of Brisbane's Johnsonian Club.

In 1888 Douglas returned to his old position on Thursday Island. In 1890 he was one of the organisers of the rescue of survivors from RMS Quetta. He also proposed that Torres Strait Islanders be given citizenship in 1900.

Port Douglas is named in his honour.

== Personal life ==
Douglas was married twice, first on 22 January 1861 to Mary Ann, daughter of the Rev. William West Simpson. She was killed in a carriage accident 23 November 1876 and, in 1877, he married for the second time, to Sarah, daughter of Michael Hickey, with whom he had four sons:

- Edward Archibald Douglas (1877–1947), was appointed a judge of the Supreme Court of Queensland in March 1929
- Henry Alexander Cecil Douglas (1879–1917), a member of the Queensland Legislative Assembly.
- Hugh Maxwell Douglas (1881–1918), a lieutenant in the 47th Battalion, 1st AIF, who died 8 April 1918 aged 37, while fighting at Dernacourt in France during World War I .
- Robert Johnstone Douglas (1883–1972), was appointed a judge of the Supreme Court of Queensland in 1923 and married Annie Alice May Ball, daughter of Townsville pioneer Andrew Ball

Douglas died on Thursday Island on 23 July 1904.

=== Descendants ===
Through his son Henry, he was a grandfather of Alexander Michael Douglas (b. 1926), and a great-grandfather of Alexander Rodney Douglas, formerly a member of the Queensland Legislative Assembly, representing the seat of Gaven.

== See also ==
- Members of the Queensland Legislative Assembly, 1860–1863; 1863–1867; 1867–1868; 1868–1870; 1873–1878; 1878–1883
- Members of the Queensland Legislative Council, 1860–1869
- List of Durham University people

Political offices
Preceded by George Thorn	Premier of Queensland; 1877 – 1879	Succeeded by Thomas McIlwraith
New South Wales Legislative Assembly
Preceded by New seat	Member for Darling Downs; 1859; Served alongside: William Handcock	Succeeded by Abolished
Preceded by William Wild	Member for Camden; 1860 – 1861; Served alongside: John Morrice	Succeeded by David Bell
Parliament of Queensland
Preceded by Alfred Sandeman	Member for Port Curtis; 1863 – 1866	Succeeded by Arthur Palmer
Preceded by John Donald McLean	Member for Eastern Downs; 1867 – 1868	Succeeded by Arthur Macalister
Preceded by James Garrick	Member for East Moreton; 1868; Served alongside: Arthur Francis	Succeeded by Henry Jordan
Preceded by Berkeley Basil Moreton	Member for Maryborough; 1875 – 1880; Served alongside: Henry King	Succeeded by Henry Palmer
