= Alfred Sandeman =

Australian politician

Member of the Queensland Legislative Assembly for Port Curtis
- In office 15 October 1861 – 11 April 1863
- Preceded by: Charles Fitzsimmons
- Succeeded by: John Douglas

Personal details
- Born: Alfred Sandeman; 1 January 1819 London, England
- Died: 26 January 1883 (aged 64) Melbourne, Victoria, Australia
- Spouse: Amelia Margaret Glassen
- Occupation: Station manager

Alfred Sandeman (1 January 1819 – 26 January 1883) was a politician in the Colony of Queensland, Australia, representing Port Curtis in the Queensland Legislative Assembly.

== Politics ==
In 1861, the sitting member for the electoral district of Port Curtis in the Queensland Legislative Assembly Charles Fitzsimmons resigned, resulting in a by-election on 15 October 1861, at which Alfred Sandeman was elected to replace him.

Sandeman's political career was short-lived, and in February 1863, his constituents called on him to resign, claiming that he rarely attended parliament and did nothing to advance issues of importance to their district. Sandeman resigned on 11 April 1863, triggering a by-election on 12 May 1863, at which John Douglas was elected.

Parliament of Queensland
Preceded by Charles Fitzsimmons	Member for Port Curtis; 1861–1863	Succeeded by John Douglas
