= Theodore Harden =

Australian politician

Member of the Queensland Legislative Assembly for Mitchell
- In office 3 August 1957 – 30 June 1971
- Preceded by: John Jones
- Succeeded by: Edward Lamb

Personal details
- Born: Theodore Harden; 1830 Ghent, Belgium
- Died: 1900 (aged 69–70) Sydney, New South Wales, Australia
- Occupation: Sheep station manager

Theodore Harden (1830 – 1900) was a member of the Queensland Legislative Assembly.

Harden won the seat of Mitchell in 1866. He resigned later in the year because he was elected against his knowledge and wishes. His brother Henry was a member of the Queensland Legislative Council.

Parliament of Queensland
Preceded by John Jones	Member for Mitchell; 1866	Succeeded by Edward Lamb
