= James Crombie (politician) =

Australian politician (1834–1898)

James Crombie (8 June 1834 – 17 September 1898) was a politician in colonial Queensland. He was a member of the Queensland Legislative Assembly from 1888 to 1898, representing the electorates of Mitchell (1888–1893) and Warrego (1893–1898).

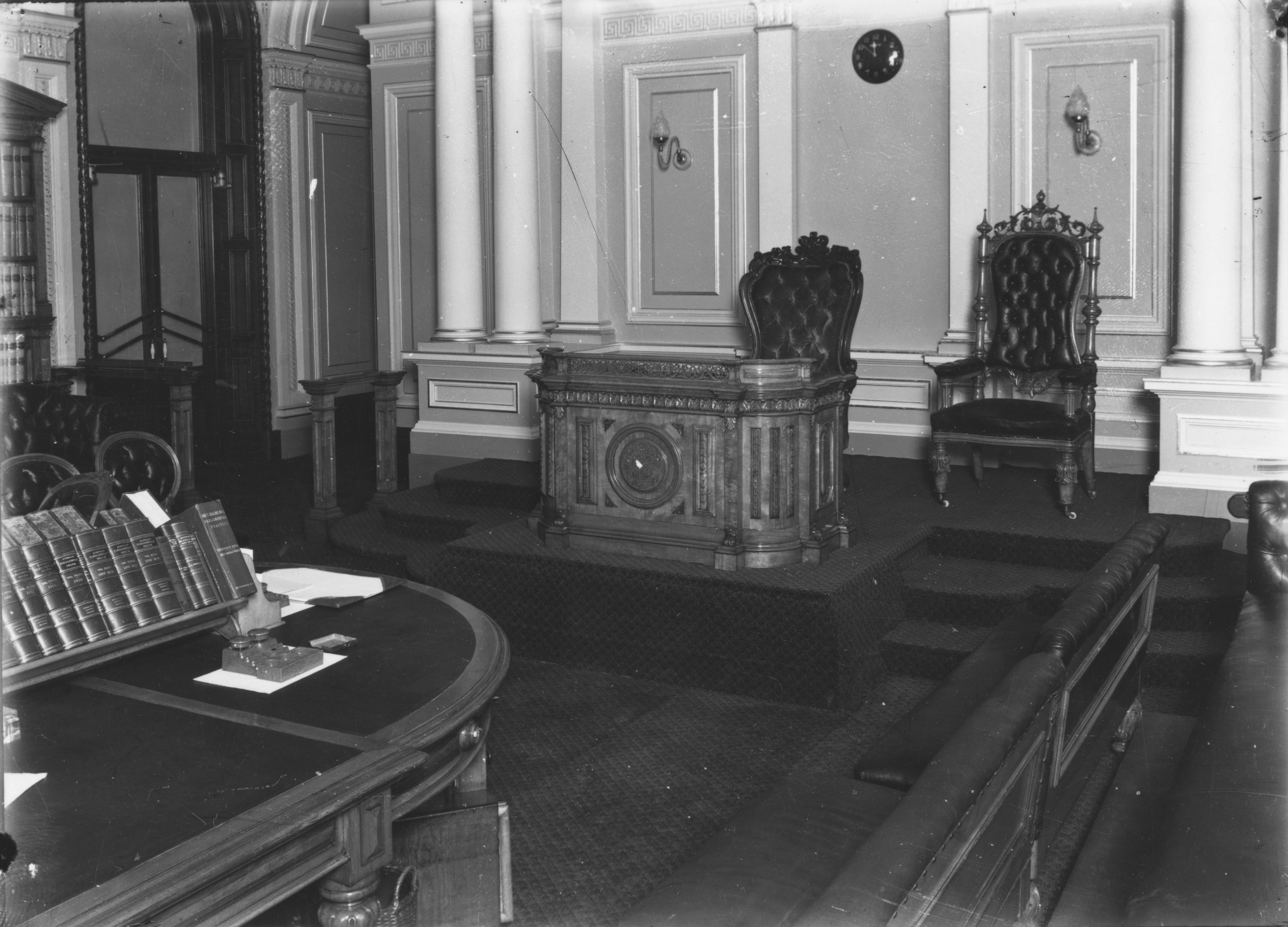
Queensland Parliament house
