= Electoral districts of Queensland =

Constituency of the Legislative Assembly of Queensland

This is a list of current and former electoral divisions for the Legislative Assembly of Queensland, the state legislature for Queensland, Australia.

== Current districts by region ==
=== Districts in Far North Queensland ===
- Barron River
- Cairns
- Cook
- Hill
- Mulgrave

=== Districts in North Queensland ===
- Burdekin
- Hinchinbrook
- Mundingburra
- Thuringowa
- Townsville
- Traeger
- Whitsunday

=== Districts in Central Queensland ===
- Bundaberg
- Burnett
- Callide
- Gladstone
- Gregory
- Hervey Bay
- Keppel
- Mackay
- Maryborough
- Mirani
- Rockhampton

=== Districts in South-West Queensland ===
- Condamine
- Southern Downs
- Toowoomba North
- Toowoomba South
- Warrego

=== Districts in South East Queensland ===
==== Greater Brisbane – Northern Districts ====
- Aspley
- Bancroft – (part of Moreton Bay)
- Clayfield
- Cooper
- Everton
- Ferny Grove – (mostly Moreton Bay)
- Kurwongbah – (part of Moreton Bay)
- McConnel
- Morayfield – (part of Moreton Bay)
- Murrumba – (part of Moreton Bay)
- Nudgee
- Pine Rivers – (part of Moreton Bay)
- Pumicestone – (part of Moreton Bay)
- Redcliffe – (part of Moreton Bay)
- Sandgate
- Stafford

==== Greater Brisbane – Southern Districts ====
- Algester
- Bulimba
- Chatsworth
- Greenslopes
- Inala
- Lytton
- Maiwar
- Mansfield
- Miller
- Moggill
- Mount Ommaney
- South Brisbane
- Stretton
- Toohey

==== Sunshine Coast ====
- Buderim
- Caloundra
- Glass House
- Gympie
- Kawana
- Maroochydore
- Nanango
- Nicklin
- Ninderry
- Noosa

==== Gold Coast ====
- Bonney
- Broadwater
- Burleigh
- Coomera
- Currumbin
- Gaven
- Mermaid Beach
- Mudgeeraba
- Southport
- Surfers Paradise
- Theodore

==== Remainder of Southeast ====
- Redlands – (part of Redland City)
- Capalaba – (part of Redland City)
- Oodgeroo – (part of Redland City)
- Ipswich – (part of City of Ipswich)
- Bundamba – (part of City of Ipswich)
- Ipswich West – (part of City of Ipswich)
- Jordan – (part of Logan City)
- Logan – (part of Logan City)
- Macalister – (part of Logan City)
- Springwood – (part of Logan City)
- Lockyer
- Waterford – (part of Logan City)
- Woodridge – (part of Logan City)
- Scenic Rim – (part of Scenic Rim Region)

== History ==
=== 1859–1864 ===
The separation of Queensland as a separate colony in 1859 lead to the establishment of an initial 16 electoral districts, returning 26 members (that is, some elected multiple representatives, number of members in parentheses):

- Burnett (2)
- Drayton and Toowoomba (1)
- East Moreton (2)
- Eastern Downs (1)
- Hamlet of Fortitude Valley (1)
- Leichhardt (2)
- Maranoa (1)
- Northern Downs (1)
- Port Curtis (1)
- Town of Brisbane (3)
- Town of Ipswich (3)
- Town of South Brisbane (1)
- Warwick (1)
- West Moreton (3)
- Western Downs (2)
- Wide Bay (1)

Members elected during this period:

- Members of the Queensland Legislative Assembly, 1860–1863

=== 1864–1872 ===
In 1864, the Additional Members Act created six more electoral districts, each with 1 member, resulting in the following set of electorates (number of members in parentheses):

- Burnett (2)
- Clermont (1) – new
- Drayton and Toowoomba (1)
- East Moreton (2)
- Eastern Downs (1)
- Hamlet of Fortitude Valley (1)
- Kennedy (1) – new
- Leichhardt (2)
- Maranoa (1)
- Maryborough (1) – new
- Mitchell (1) – new
- Northern Downs (1)
- Port Curtis (1)
- Rockhampton (1) – new
- Town of Brisbane (3)
- Town of Ipswich (3)
- Town of South Brisbane (1)
- Warrego (1) – new
- Warwick (1)
- West Moreton (3)
- Western Downs (2)
- Wide Bay (1)

This made a total of 22 electorates with 32 members.

Members elected for this period:

- Members of the Queensland Legislative Assembly, 1863–1867
- Members of the Queensland Legislative Assembly, 1867–1868
- Members of the Queensland Legislative Assembly, 1868–1870
- Members of the Queensland Legislative Assembly, 1870–1871
- Members of the Queensland Legislative Assembly, 1871–1873

=== 1872–1878 ===
The Electoral Districts Act (1872) resulted in 42 one-member electorates for the 1873 election, while in 1875 the Cook District Representation Act added the Electoral district of Cook.

Four electorates were renamed:

- Hamlet of Fortitude Valley became Fortitude Valley
- Town of Brisbane became Brisbane City
- Town of Ipswich became Ipswich
- Town of South Brisbane became South Brisbane

Two electorates were abolished:

- Eastern Downs
- Western Downs

Twenty-two new electorates were introduced at the 1873 elections (by the 1872 Act) plus Cook in 1876, resulting in the following set of electorates (number of members shown in parentheses) :

- Aubigny (1) – new
- Balonne (1) – new
- Blackall (1) – new
- Bowen (1) – new
- Bremer (1) – new
- Brisbane City (1, was 3) – renamed
- Bulimba (1) – new
- Bundamba (1) – new
- Burke (1) – new
- Burnett (1, was 2)
- Carnarvon (1) – new
- Clermont (1)
- Cook (1) – new from 1875
- Dalby (1) – new
- Darling Downs (1) – new
- Drayton and Toowoomba (1)
- East Moreton (1, was 2)
- Enoggera (1) – new
- Fassifern (1) – new
- Fortitude Valley (1) -renamed
- Gympie (1) – new
- Ipswich (1, was 3) – renamed
- Kennedy (1)
- Leichhardt (1, was 2)
- Logan (1) – new
- Maranoa (1)
- Maryborough (1)
- Mitchell (1)
- Mulgrave (1) – new
- Normanby (1) – new
- Northern Downs (1)
- Oxley (1) – new
- Port Curtis (1)
- Ravenswood (1) – new
- Rockhampton (1)
- South Brisbane (1) – renamed
- Springsure (1) – new
- Stanley (1) – new
- Warrego (1)
- Warwick (1)
- West Moreton (1, was 3)
- Wickham (1) – new
- Wide Bay (1)

So 22 electorates with 2 abolished and 22 introduced resulted in 42 electorates each returning 1 member (1873) and 43 electorates each returning 1 member (1876).

Members elected during this period:

- Members of the Queensland Legislative Assembly, 1873–1878

=== 1878–1900 ===
Districts redistributed or renamed 1878 to 1900

- Barcoo (1885–1972)
- Brisbane North (1888–1912)
- Bulloo (1888–1912)
- Burrum (1888–1932)
- Cambooya (1888–1912)
- Carpentaria (1888–1960)
- Croydon (1893–1912)
- Eastern Downs (1860–1873)
- Cunningham (1888–2009)
- Fitzroy (1888–1960, 1992–2009)
- Flinders (1888–1932, 1950–1992)
- Gregory (1878–present)
- Herbert (1888–1950)
- Moreton (1878–1912)
- Murilla (1888–1935)
- Musgrave (1886–1923)
- North Brisbane (1878–1888)
- Nundah (1888–1992)
- Rockhampton North (1888–1912, 1960–1992)
- Rosewood (1878–1932)
- Toombul (1888–1932)
- Toowong (1888–1992)
- Woolloongabba (1888–1912)
- Woothakata (1888–1912)

=== 1901–1949 ===
Districts redistributed or renamed between 1901 and 1949

- Baroona (1935–1977)
- Brisbane (1912–1977)
- Buranda (1912–1960)
- Cooroora (1912–1992)
- Drayton (1912–1927)
- East Toowoomba (1912–1950)
- Eacham (1912–1932)
- Hamilton (1932–1950)
- Isis (1932–1992)
- Ithaca (1912–1986)
- Kelvin Grove (1923–1960)
- Kurilpa (1912–1986)
- Maree (1912–1944)
- Merthyr (1912–1992)
- Mount Morgan (1912–1932)
- Paddington (1912–1932)
- Pittsworth (1912–1923)
- Queenton (1912–1932)
- The Tableland (1932–1950)
- Toowoomba (1912–1950)
- Windsor (1912–1992)

=== 1950–2017 ===
Districts redistributed or renamed between 1950 and 2017

- Albert (1960–2017)
- Archerfield (1972–1998)
- Ashgrove (1960–2017)
- Auburn (1972–1992)
- Barambah (1950–2001)
- Beaudesert (1992–2017)
- Belmont (1960–1977)
- Belyando (1950–1977)
- Brisbane Central (1977–2017)
- Broadsound (1986–1992)
- Caboolture (1977–2001)
- Charters Towers (1992–2009)
- Chermside (1950–1960, 1992–2001)
- Cleveland (1992–2017)
- Coorparoo (1950–1960)
- Crows Nest (1992–2001)
- Dalrymple (2009–2017)
- Darling Downs (2001–2009)
- Darlington (1950–1960)
- Haughton (1950–1960)
- Hawthorne (1960–1972)
- Indooroopilly (1992–2017)
- Ipswich East (1960–1972)
- Kedron (1950–1972, 1992–2001)
- Kurwongbah (1992–2009, 2017–present)
- Landsborough (1950–1992)
- Mackenzie (1950–1972)
- Manly (1986–1992)
- Marodian (1950–1960)
- Merrimac (1992–2001)
- Mooloolah (1992–2001)
- Mount Coot-tha (1950–2017)
- Mount Gravatt (1950–2009)
- Mount Isa (1972–2017)
- Mourilyan (1950–1992)
- Nash (1950–1960)
- Nerang (1986–2001)
- Norman (1950–1960)
- North Toowoomba (1950–1960)
- Peak Downs (1977–1992)
- Pine Rivers (1972–1992)
- Robina (2001–2009)
- Rockhampton South (1960–1969)
- Roma (1950–1992)
- Salisbury (1960–1992)
- Sherwood (1950–1992)
- Somerset (1950–1992)
- South Coast (1960–1992)
- Sunnybank (1992–2001; 2009–2017)
- Toowoomba East (1960–1972)
- Toowoomba South (1972–2008)
- Toowoomba West (1960–1972)
- Tablelands (1986–2009)
- Townsville East (1986–1992)
- Townsville North (1960–1972)
- Townsville South (1960–1986)
- Townsville West (1972–1992)
- Wavell (1960–1986)
- Wolston (1972–1992)
- Wynnum (1923–1986)
- Yeerongpilly (2001–2017)
- Yeronga (1950–1992)
