= Electoral district of Eastern Downs =

Eastern Downs Queensland—Legislative Assembly
- State: Queensland
- Created: 1859
- Abolished: 1872

Eastern Downs was a Legislative Assembly electorate in the colony of Queensland (later a state of Australia).

== History ==
Eastern Downs was of the original sixteen electorates of 1859. It comprised a large area south-west of Toowoomba embracing Texas, Warwick, Dalby and all the area south to the New South Wales border. It was abolished in the 1872 redistribution, being split into the Electoral district of Darling Downs, the Electoral district of Carnarvon and the Electoral district of Balonne.

== Members ==
The following people were elected in the seat of Eastern Downs:

Member	Party	Term
Ratcliffe Pring		27 April 1860 – 22 April 1862
John Donald McLean		2 May 1862 – 16 December 1866
John Douglas		4 January 1867 (by-election) – 18 September 1868
Arthur Macalister		18 September 1868 (by-election) – 22 July 1871
Edmond Thornton		22 July 1871 – 6 November 1873

== See also ==
- Electoral districts of Queensland
- Members of the Queensland Legislative Assembly by year
- Category:Members of the Queensland Legislative Assembly by name
