= Members of the Queensland Legislative Assembly, 1860–1863 =

This is a list of members of the 1st Legislative Assembly of Queensland from 1860 to 1863, as elected at the inaugural 1860 colonial elections held between 27 April 1860 to 11 May 1860 (due to problems of distance and communications, it was not possible to hold the elections on a single day).

Name	Electorate	Term in office
Joshua Peter Bell^{[11]}	West Moreton	1862–1879
Charles Blakeney	Town of Brisbane	1860–1865
Alfred Broughton^{[4]}	West Moreton	1860
Henry Buckley^{[2]}	East Moreton	1860
Henry Challinor^{[4]}^{[6]}	West Moreton	1861–1868
Charles Coxen	Northern Downs	1860–1867
Benjamin Cribb^{[5]}	West Moreton	1861–1867; 1870–1873
Robert Cribb^{[3]}	Town of Brisbane	1860–1867
John Douglas^{[12]}	Port Curtis	1863–1866; 1867–1868; 1875–1880
George Edmondstone	East Moreton	1860–1867; 1869–1877
Gilbert Eliott	Wide Bay	1860–1870
John Ferrett	Maranoa	1860–1863; 1870–1873
Charles Fitzsimmons^{[7]}	Port Curtis	1860–1861, 1865–1868
Joseph Fleming^{[1]}^{[11]}	West Moreton	1860–1862; 1866–1867
Frederick Forbes	Town of Ipswich	1860–1863; 1865–1867; 1868–1873
St. George Richard Gore^{[8]}	Warwick	1860–1862
William Henry Groom^{[10]}	Drayton and Toowoomba	1862–1901
Charles Haly	Burnett	1860–1863; 1865–1867; 1869–1871; 1876–1878
Hon Robert Herbert	Leichhardt	1860–1866
John Gore Jones^{[8]}	Warwick	1862–1863; 1865–1866
Henry Jordan^{[3]}	Town of Brisbane	1860; 1868–1871; 1883–1890
Charles Lilley	Hamlet of Fortitude Valley	1860–1873
Arthur Macalister	Town of Ipswich	1860–1871; 1872–1876
Robert Mackenzie	Burnett	1860–1869
John Donald McLean^{[9]}	Eastern Downs	1862–1866
Thomas DeLacy Moffat	Western Downs	1860–1864
William Nelson^{[1]}	West Moreton	1860
Patrick O'Sullivan	Town of Ipswich	1860–1863; 1867–1868; 1876–1883; 1888–1893
Ratcliffe Pring^{[9]}	Eastern Downs	1860–1862; 1863–1866; 1867–1872; 1873–1874; 1878–1879
George Raff	Town of Brisbane	1860–1864; 1865–1867
Henry Richards	Town of South Brisbane	1860–1863
Charles Royds	Leichhardt	1860–1864; 1868–1872
Alfred Sandeman^{[7]}^{[12]}	Port Curtis	1861–1863
James Taylor	Western Downs	1860–1870
George Thorn (senior)^{[5]}	West Moreton	1860–1861
Thomas Warry^{[2]}	East Moreton	1860–1863
John Watts^{[10]}	Drayton and Toowoomba	1860–1862; 1864–1867

== See also ==
- Premier:

Robert Herbert (1859–1866)

== Notes ==
^{1} On 22 June 1860, William Nelson, member for West Moreton, was unseated by petition. Joseph Fleming won the resulting by-election on 9 July 1860.
^{2} On 29 September 1860, Henry Buckley, member for East Moreton, resigned. Thomas Warry won the resulting by-election on 27 October 1860.
^{3} On 17 October 1860, Henry Jordan, member for Town of Brisbane, resigned. Robert Cribb won the resulting by-election on 8 December 1860.
^{4} On 21 December 1860, Alfred Broughton, member for West Moreton, resigned. Henry Challinor won the resulting by-election on 12 January 1861.
^{5} On 3 April 1861, George Thorn (senior), member for West Moreton, resigned. Benjamin Cribb won the resulting by-election on 26 April 1861.
^{6} On 16 May 1861, Henry Challinor, the member for West Moreton, resigned. He was re-elected at the resulting by-election on 31 May 1861.
^{7} On 3 September 1861, Charles Fitzsimmons, the member for Port Curtis, resigned. Alfred Sandeman won the resulting by-election on 15 October 1861.
^{8} On 14 January 1862, St. George Richard Gore, member for Warwick, resigned to contest a ministerial by-election after being made Secretary of Public Lands and Works. He was defeated by John Gore Jones at the resulting by-election on 4 February 1862.
^{9} On 22 April 1862, Ratcliffe Pring, the member for Eastern Downs, resigned. John Donald McLean won the resulting by-election on 2 May 1862.
^{10} On 26 July 1862, John Watts, the member for Drayton and Toowoomba, resigned. William Henry Groom won the resulting by-election on 11 August 1862.
^{11} On 3 November 1862, Joseph Fleming, the member for West Moreton, resigned. Joshua Peter Bell won the resulting by-election on 15 December 1862.
^{12} On 11 April 1863, Alfred Sandeman, the member for Port Curtis resigned due to complaints about his inactivity by his constituents. John Douglas won the resulting by-election on 12 May 1863.
