= Members of the Queensland Legislative Assembly, 1868–1870 =

This is a list of members of the 4th Legislative Assembly of Queensland from 1868 to 1870, as elected at the 1868 colonial elections held between 14 September 1868 and 6 October 1868 (due to problems of distance and communications, it was not possible to hold the elections on a single day).

Name	Electorate	Term in office
Archibald Archer^{[6]}	Rockhampton	1867–1869; 1878–1886; 1888–1896
Robert Travers Atkin^{[2]}^{[9]}	Clermont; East Moreton	1868–1869; 1870–1872
Joshua Peter Bell	Northern Downs	1862–1879
John Robinson Benson^{[10]}	Clermont	1870–1870
Rt Hon John Bright^{[5]}	Kennedy	1869–1870
Archibald Berdmore Buchanan^{[8]}	Mitchell	1870; 1871–1873
Oscar de Satge^{[2]}^{[10]}	Clermont	1869–1870; 1870–1872; 1873–1877; 1881–1882
John Douglas^{[1]}	East Moreton	1863–1866; 1867–1868; 1875–1880
George Edmondstone^{[3]}	Town of Brisbane	1860–1867; 1869–1877
Gilbert Eliott	Wide Bay	1860–1870
John Ferrett^{[12]}	West Moreton	1860–1863; 1870–1873
Thomas Henry FitzGerald^{[5]}	Kennedy	1867–1869; 1873–1875
Frederick Forbes	West Moreton	1860–1863; 1865–1867; 1868–1873
Arthur Francis^{[9]}	East Moreton	1867–1870
Simon Fraser	Town of Brisbane	1868–1870; 1873–1878; 1880–1888
Alexander Fyfe ^{[11]}	Rockhampton	1870–1873
William Henry Groom	Drayton and Toowoomba	1862–1901
Charles Haly^{[4]}	Burnett	1860–1863; 1865–1867; 1869–1871; 1876–1878
Hon Arthur Hodgson^{[7]}	Warrego	1868–1869
Samuel Hodgson^{[12]}	West Moreton	1868–1870
Henry Jordan^{[1]}	East Moreton	1860; 1868–1871; 1883–1890
Edward Lamb^{[8]}	Mitchell	1867–1869
Charles Lilley	Hamlet of Fortitude Valley	1860–1873
Arthur Macalister	Eastern Downs	1860–1871; 1872–1876
Thomas McIlwraith^{[7]}	Warrego	1870–1871; 1873–1886; 1888–1896
Robert Mackenzie^{[4]}	Burnett	1860–1869
William Miles	Maranoa	1864–1873; 1874–1875; 1876–1887
Henry Milford ^{[6]}^{[11]}	Rockhampton	1869–1870
John Murphy	Town of Ipswich	1867–1870
Kevin O'Doherty	Town of Brisbane	1867–1873
Hon Arthur Hunter Palmer	Port Curtis	1866–1881
Ratcliffe Pring	Burnett	1860–1862; 1863–1866; 1867–1872; 1873–1874; 1878–1879
Theophilus Parsons Pugh^{[3]}	Town of Brisbane	1863–1869
Robert Ramsay	Western Downs	1867–1873
Charles Royds	Leichhardt	1860–1864; 1868–1872
Gordon Sandeman	Leichhardt	1863–1870
Thomas Blacket Stephens	Town of South Brisbane	1863–1875
James Taylor	Western Downs	1860–1870
John Malbon Thompson	Town of Ipswich	1868–1881
George Thorn	West Moreton	1867–1874; 1876–1878; 1879–1883; 1887–1888; 1893–1902
Edmond Thornton	Warwick	1868–1870; 1871–1873
William Henry Walsh	Maryborough	1865–1878
Henry Williams	Town of Ipswich	1868–1870

== See also ==
- Premier:

Robert Mackenzie (1867–1868)
Charles Lilley (1868–1870)

== Notes ==
^{1} On 11 December 1868, John Douglas, member for East Moreton, resigned. Henry Jordan won the resulting by-election on 23 December 1868.
^{2} On 29 January 1869, Robert Travers Atkin, member for Clermont, resigned. Oscar de Satge won the resulting by-election on 4 March 1869.
^{3} On 30 January 1869, Theophilus Parsons Pugh, member for Town of Brisbane, resigned. George Edmondstone was elected unopposed at the resulting by-election on 10 February 1869.
^{4} On 6 April 1869, Robert Mackenzie, former premier and member for Burnett, retired from politics and departed for Europe. Charles Haly won the resulting by-election on 21 April 1869.
^{5} On 11 June 1869, Thomas Henry FitzGerald, member for Kennedy, resigned. Rt Hon John Bright, an English Radical politician who was endorsed as a form of protest, won the resulting by-election on 10 July 1869. He never took his seat in the Queensland Parliament.
^{6} On 19 November 1869, Archibald Archer, member for Rockhampton, resigned. Henry Milford won the resulting by-election on 6 December 1869, although did not take his seat.
^{7} On 23 November 1869, Arthur Hodgson, the member for Warrego, resigned. Thomas McIlwraith won the resulting by-election on 5 January 1870.
^{8} On 3 December 1869, Edward Lamb, member for Mitchell, resigned. Archibald Berdmore Buchanan won the resulting by-election on 8 February 1870; however, it emerged he had not nominated as a candidate and had been elected against his own wishes, and he resigned two days later.
^{9} On 17 February 1870, Arthur Francis, member for East Moreton, resigned due to insolvency. After Robert Cribb withdrew his nomination, Robert Travers Atkin was elected unopposed on 17 February 1870.
^{10} On 4 April 1870, Oscar de Satge, member for the Clermont resigned. John Robinson Benson won the resulting by-election on 4 May 1870.
^{11} On 7 June 1870, Henry Milford, member for Rockhampton since a December 1869 by-election, resigned. He stood again at the resulting by-election on 20 June 1870, but was defeated by Alexander Fyfe.
^{12} On 13 June 1870, Samuel Hodgson, member for West Moreton, resigned. John Ferrett won the resulting by-election on 25 June 1870.
