= Electoral district of Mitchell (Queensland) =

State electoral district of Queensland, Australia

Mitchell Queensland—Legislative Assembly
- State: Queensland
- Created: 1864
- Abolished: 1931

Mitchell was a Legislative Assembly electorate in the state of Queensland, Australia.

== History ==
The electoral district of Mitchell was created by the Additional Members Act of 1864 which introduced six new single-member electorates. A by-election was held to fill the seat. The nomination date was 18 March 1865 and the election was held on 25 March 1865.

In 1885, part of Mitchell was removed to form the new Electoral district of Barcoo.

In 1931, a redistribution absorbed Mitchell into the Electoral district of Barcoo and the Electoral district of Gregory.

== Members ==
The following people were elected in Mitchell:

| Member | Party | Term |
|---|---|---|
| John Gore Jones | | 18 March 1865 (by-election) - 1 January 1866 |
| Theodore Harden | | 22 February 1866 (by-election) - 23 November 1866 |
| Edward William Lamb | | 4 January 1867 (by-election) - 3 December 1869 |
| Archibald Buchanan | | 8 February 1870 (by-election) - 10 February 1870 |
| John Killeen Handy | | 18 June 1870 (by-election) - 4 September 1871 |
| Boyd Dunlop Morehead | Ministerialist | 4 September 1871 – 16 December 1880 |
| Oscar de Satge | | 3 February 1881 – 5 April 1882 |
| John Govett | | 27 April 1882 – 28 April 1888 |
| James Crombie | Ministerialist | 28 April 1888 – 20 May 1893 |
| John Cameron | Opposition | 20 May 1893 – 4 April 1896 |
| Charles Fitzgerald | ALP | 4 April 1896 – 11 March 1902 |
| Arthur Cooper | Independent, Ministerialist | 11 March 1902 – 14 April 1905 |
| John Payne | ALP | 13 May 1905 (by-election) - 24 January 1928 |
| Richard Bow | ALP | 26 May 1928 – 11 June 1932 |

== See also ==
- Electoral districts of Queensland
- Members of the Queensland Legislative Assembly by year
- Category:Members of the Queensland Legislative Assembly by name
