= Members of the Queensland Legislative Assembly, 1863–1867 =

This is a list of members of the 2nd Legislative Assembly of Queensland from 1863 to 1867, as elected at the 1863 colonial elections held between 30 May 1863 and 27 June 1863 (due to problems of distance and communications, it was not possible to hold the elections on a single day).

Name	Electorate	Term in office
Joshua Peter Bell	West Moreton	1862–1879
Charles Blakeney^{[8]}	Town of Brisbane	1860–1865
William Brookes^{[1]}^{[3]}	Town of Brisbane	1863; 1864–1867; 1882–1888
Henry Challinor	Town of Ipswich	1861–1868
Charles Coxen	Northern Downs	1860–1867
Benjamin Cribb	West Moreton	1861–1867; 1870–1873
Robert Cribb^{[1]}	East Moreton	1860–1867
George Dalrymple^{[6]}	Kennedy	1865–1867
Sydney Davis^{[6]}^{[13]}	Clermont	1865–1866
John Douglas^{[10]}	Port Curtis	1863–1866; 1867–1868; 1875–1880
George Edmondstone	East Moreton	1860–1867; 1869–1877
John Edwards^{[7]}	Burnett	1863–1865
Gilbert Eliott	Wide Bay	1860–1870
Charles Fitzsimmons^{[6]}	Rockhampton	1860–1861, 1865–1868
Joseph Fleming^{[12]}	West Moreton	1860–1862; 1866–1867
Frederick Forbes^{[6]}	Warrego	1860–1863; 1865–1867; 1868–1873
George Forbes^{[13]}	Clermont	1866–1867
William Henry Groom	Drayton and Toowoomba	1862–1901
Charles Haly^{[7]}	Burnett	1860–1863; 1865–1867; 1869–1871; 1876–1878
Theodore Harden^{[9]}^{[14]}	Mitchell	1866
Robert Herbert^{[12]}	West Moreton	1860–1866
John Gore Jones^{[6]}^{[9]}	Mitchell	1862–1863; 1865–1866
William Kennedy^{[4]}	Maranoa	1863–1864
Edward Lamb^{[14]}	Mitchell	1867–1869
Charles Lilley	Hamlet of Fortitude Valley	1860–1873
Arthur Macalister	Town of Ipswich	1860–1871; 1872–1876
Robert Mackenzie	Burnett	1860–1869
John Donald McLean^{[15]}	Eastern Downs	1862–1866
William Miles^{[4]}	Maranoa	1864–1873; 1874–1875; 1876–1887
Thomas DeLacy Moffat^{[5]}	Western Downs	1860–1864
Arthur Hunter Palmer^{[10]}	Port Curtis	1866–1881
Ratcliffe Pring^{[11]}	Town of Ipswich	1860–1862; 1863–1866; 1867–1872; 1873–1874; 1878–1879
Theophilus Parsons Pugh	Town of Brisbane	1863–1869
George Raff^{[3]}^{[8]}	Town of Brisbane	1860–1864; 1865–1867
George Reed^{[11]}	Town of Ipswich	1866–1867
Charles Royds^{[2]}	Leichhardt	1860–1864; 1868–1872
Edmund Royds^{[2]}	Leichhardt	1864–1868; 1872–1875
Gordon Sandeman	Leichhardt	1863–1870
Thomas Blacket Stephens	Town of South Brisbane	1863–1875
James Taylor	Western Downs	1860–1870
Roderick Travers^{[13]}	Clermont	1866
William Henry Walsh^{[6]}	Maryborough	1865–1878
John Watts	Western Downs	1860–1862; 1864–1867
Arnold Wienholt	Warwick	1863–1867

== See also ==
- Premier:

Robert Herbert (1859–February 1866)
Arthur Macalister (February–July 1866)
Robert Herbert (July–August 1866)
Arthur Macalister (August 1866–August 1867)

== Notes ==
^{1} On 15 September 1863, upon a successful petition by Robert Cribb on the basis that printed lines on the ballot paper misled voters, the election in East Moreton was declared void. The election was re-run on 26 September, and William Brookes lost his seat to Cribb, whilst George Edmondstone retained his.
^{2} On 8 February 1864, Charles Royds, the member for Leichhardt, resigned. His brother Edmund Royds won the resulting by-election on 14 April 1864.
^{3} On 8 April 1864, George Raff, member for Town of Brisbane, resigned. William Brookes won the resulting by-election on 22 April 1864.
^{4} On 28 July 1864, William Kennedy, the member for Maranoa, was unseated by the Elections and Qualifications Committee. William Miles won the resulting by-election on 27 September 1864.
^{5} On 2 October 1864, Thomas DeLacy Moffat, member for Western Downs, died. John Watts won the resulting by-election on 2 November 1864.
^{6} Under the Additional Members Act 1864, the seats of Clermont, Kennedy, Maryborough, Mitchell, Rockhampton and Warrego were created. By-elections to fill the new seats were held on 1 February 1865 (Maryborough and Rockhampton), on 18 March 1865 (Clermont and Kennedy) and on 25 March 1865 (Mitchell and Warrego).
^{7} On 15 April 1865, John Edwards, the member for Burnett, resigned. Charles Haly won the resulting by-election on 13 May 1865.
^{8} On 25 November 1865, Charles Blakeney, member for Town of Brisbane, resigned. George Raff won the resulting by-election on 25 November 1865.
^{9} On 1 January 1866, John Gore Jones, the member for Mitchell, resigned. Theodore Harden won the resulting by-election on 22 February 1866.
^{10} On 1 February 1866, John Douglas, the member for Port Curtis, was appointed as a minister. As such, he was required to resign and contest a ministerial by-election for his own seat. On 19 March 1866, he lost the by-election to Arthur Hunter Palmer.
^{11} On 21 July 1866, the member for Ipswich Ratcliffe Pring was appointed Attorney-General of Queensland by Premier Robert Herbert. As such, he was required to resign and contest a ministerial by-election for his own seat. On 4 August 1866, he lost the seat to George McCullagh Reed.
^{12} On 7 August 1866, the Premier of Queensland and member for West Moreton, Robert Herbert, resigned. Joseph Fleming won the resulting by-election on 11 September 1866.
^{13} On 18 August 1866, Sydney Davis, the member for Clermont, resigned. Roderick Travers won the resulting by-election on 11 September 1866; however, he declined to take the seat and resigned on 12 October. A further by-election on 13 November 1866 was won by George Forbes.
^{14} On 22 November 1866, Theodore Harden, the member for Mitchell, resigned. Edward Lamb won the resulting by-election on 4 January 1867.
^{15} On 16 December 1866, John Donald McLean, the member for Eastern Downs, died. No by-election was held due to the proximity of the 1867 elections.
