= Dutton Park Place busway station =

Bus station in Brisbane, Australia

Dutton Park Place
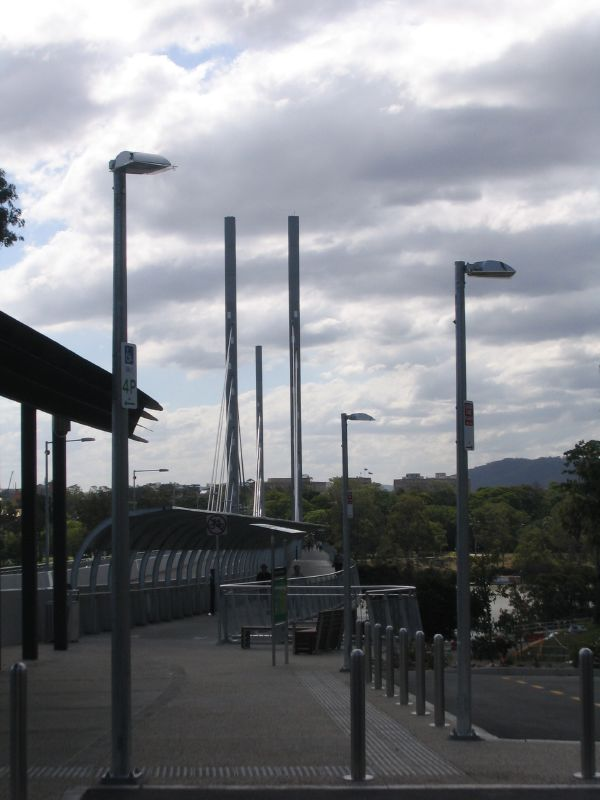

General information
- Location: Eleanor Schonell Bridge, Dutton Park
- Coordinates: 27.497988°S 153.024770°E
- Owner: Department of Transport & Main Roads
- Operator: Transport for Brisbane
- Line: Eastern
- Platforms: 2
- Bus routes: 6

Construction
- Accessible: Yes

Other information
- Station code: 018055 (platform 1); 018056 (platform 2)
- Website: Translink

History
- Opened: 3 August 2009; 17 years ago
Location

Dutton Park Place is a bus stop operated by Translink on the Eastern Busway. It opened in 2011 and serves the Brisbane suburb of Dutton Park. It is a ground level stop, featuring two side platforms.

The stop is situated on the eastern bank of the Brisbane River next to the Eleanor Schonell Bridge. The stop is close to the University of Queensland and its busway station, opposite the river. Passengers can access the stop from TJ Doyle Memorial Park Drive, near the South Brisbane Cemetery, while buses can enter and exit the stop independently of the Eastern Busway at the Annerley Road–Gladstone Road intersection.

Despite being situated along the Eastern Busway, Dutton Park Place is classed as a bus stop, similar to Federation Street bus stop and Truro Street bus stop along the Northern Busway.

== History ==
Although the Bridge was constructed in 2006, the bus stop on its eastern end at Dutton Park Place was only opened on 3 August 2009, as part of the Boggo Road Busway connecting UQ Lakes to Buranda. Before opening, the proximity of the Dutton Park bus stop construction works to the South Brisbane Cemetery was somewhat controversial, prompting concern from Prime Minister Kevin Rudd.

The bus stop acts as an important component of the environmentally friendly nature of the attached Eleanor Schonell Bridge. It provides busway access to pedestrians and cyclists, and connects to Brisbane's lengthy bikeway network.

== Routes ==
Dutton Park Place is serviced by six Translink routes, all of which terminate at the adjacent UQ Lakes busway station and are operated by Transport for Brisbane. Three of these routes travel to/from Brisbane City further north, via either the Woolloongabba busway station, the RBWH busway station, or Highgate Hill and West End – the latter route is the only one to enter/exit the Eastern Busway at Dutton Park Place, rather than continuing to/from Boggo Road busway station.

The other three routes reach outer Brisbane, travelling either to/from the easterly Carindale bus station, or the southerly Eight Mile Plains busway station or Sunnybank Hills.
