= Dutton Park State School =

Public school in Queensland

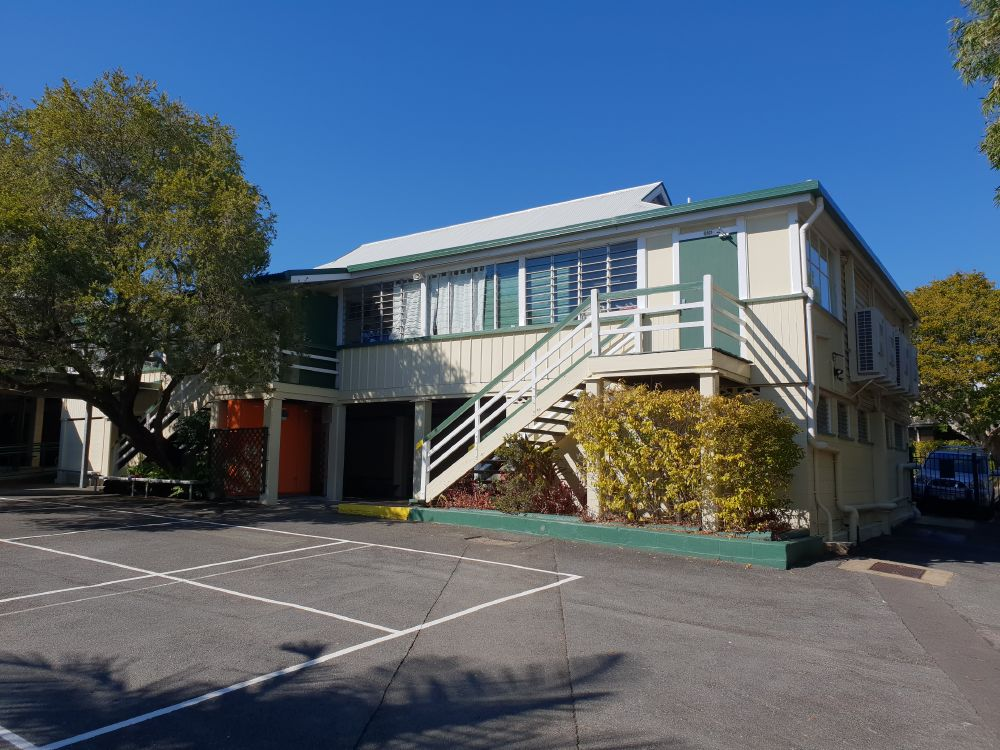
- Block B, north elevation, 2018

- Location within Queensland
- 27.4934°S 153.0282°E
- Location: 112 Annerley Road, Dutton Park, City of Brisbane, Queensland, Australia

History
- Design period: 1914–1919 (World War I)
- Built: 1916–1934, 1936

Queensland Heritage Register
- Official name: Dutton Park State School; Woolloongabba State School; Woolloongabba Boys State School; Dutton Park Boys State School
- Type: state heritage
- Designated: 30 November 2018
- Reference no.: 650087
- Type: Education, Research, Scientific Facility: School – state (primary)
- Theme: Educating Queenslanders: Providing primary schooling

Dutton Park State School is a heritage-listed government primary school at 112 Annerley Road, Dutton Park, City of Brisbane, Queensland, Australia. It was built from 1916 to 1934. It was also known as Woolloongabba State School, Woolloongabba Boys State School, and Dutton Park Boys State School. It was added to the Queensland Heritage Register on 30 November 2018.

== History ==
Dutton Park State School is located in the suburb of Dutton Park, approximately 2.67 kilometres (1.66 mi) south of the Brisbane central business district (CBD). It was established in 1884 as Woolloongabba State School on the northern side of a large school reserve. In 1886 the school was divided into Woolloongabba Girls and Infants State School, using the existing buildings, and the Woolloongabba Boys State School, established on the current Dutton Park State School site. Renamed Dutton Park Boys State School and Dutton Park Girls and Infants State School in 1910, the schools amalgamated in 1935 as Dutton Park State School, on the boys school site. The school is important in demonstrating the evolution of state education and its associated architecture. It retains a rare open-air annexe (1916, now called Block B) and two intact interwar concrete toilet blocks (1936); set in landscaped grounds with mature trees, play areas and sporting facilities. Dutton Park State School has a strong and ongoing association with the Dutton Park community.

European settlement of the Dutton Park area proceeded slowly. From the 1840s, farms were established near the Brisbane River. Land in the vicinity of the later Dutton Park school site was surveyed in 1863 for future government uses. By 1883 there were about ten residences along Gladstone Road, most on large allotments on the ridge overlooking the river. The new Boggo Road Gaol on Annerley Road (formally Boggo Road) opened in 1883. To the south-east, the Diamantina Orphanage also opened in 1883, later evolving into a blind, deaf and dumb institute, the Diamantina hospital for chronic diseases in 1901 and the Princess Alexandra Hospital in 1956. Residential subdivision of land, from large land holdings around the future school site, occurred during Brisbane's 1880s land boom. As transport became available, more people moved to the district. A railway station opened at Dutton Park (called Boggo Junction railway station, now Dutton Park railway station) in 1884. The first horse-drawn bus service linking Dutton Park with the city commenced in 1890 and was replaced by electric tram along Gladstone Road by 1908, which stimulated rapid development of the area. In 1914 the suburb was named in honour of Charles Dutton, Secretary of Public Lands between 1883 and 1887.

The establishment of schools was considered an essential step in the development of new communities and integral to their success. Locals often donated land and labour for a school's construction and the school community contributed to maintenance and development. Schools became a community focus, a symbol of progress, and a source of pride, with enduring connections formed with past students, parents, and teachers.

To help ensure consistency and economy, the Queensland Government developed standard plans for its school buildings. From the 1860s until the 1960s, Queensland school buildings were predominantly timber-framed, an easy and cost-effective approach that also enabled the government to provide facilities in remote areas. Standard designs were continually refined in response to changing needs and educational philosophy and Queensland school buildings were particularly innovative in climate control, lighting and ventilation.

In 1882 the Woolloongabba community united to raise money for a school in the area, as existing schools at Kangaroo Point and South Brisbane were considered too far away. With the assistance of Simon Fraser, MLA, their efforts came to fruition. A 4-acre (1.6 ha) site bounded by Annerley Road, Park Road and Merton Street, was granted and construction of the school began in late 1883. Woolloongabba State School opened on 1 September 1884, with more than 400 students.

Enrolments at the school quickly increased. Within a few months, the average daily attendance was about 555 students. Consequently, it was decided to separate the school into a Girls and Infants school, and a Boys school. In 1884, the school reserve was extended by 4 acres (1.6 ha) to the south to accommodate the new boys school building. Work commenced on the Woolloongabba Boys School, sited on the southern portion of the school reserve, in 1885. It opened on 5 July 1886 with 353 boys enrolled.

In 1889, 1.5 acres (0.61 ha) of land was resumed from the school reserve for re-alignment of the Cleveland railway line, dividing the Girls and Infants School (north of the railway line) from the Boys School (south of the railway line).

An important component of Queensland state schools was their grounds. The early and continuing commitment to play-based education, particularly in primary school, resulted in the provision of outdoor play space and sporting facilities, such as playing fields and tennis courts. Also, trees and gardens were planted to shade and beautify schools. Arbor Day celebrations began in Queensland in 1890. Aesthetically designed gardens were encouraged by regional inspectors, and educators believed gardening and Arbor Days instilled in young minds the value of hard work and activity, improved classroom discipline, developed aesthetic tastes, and inspired people to stay on the land.

Woolloongabba (Dutton Park) State School participated in Arbor Day from 1890. In 1892 the children planted trees on both sides of the railway cutting. Closure of part of Annerley Road in 1907 provided additional land to the school grounds. A contemporary pupil reported that a row of palms was planted along the Annerley Road boundary by the whole school in 1908.

In 1910, the Woolloongabba Girls and Infants State School and Woolloongabba Boys State School were renamed the Dutton Park State School for Girls and Infants and the Dutton Park State School for Boys.

Due to the need for more accommodation, an open-air annexe (now called Block B) was constructed at Dutton Park State School for Girls and Infants in 1916. Although experimentation with "open-air" buildings started as early as the 1890s, open-air annexes were introduced as a standard design in 1913 by the Department of Public Works (DPW) in conjunction with the Department of Public Instruction. This design was developed in response to contemporary medical thought related to the need for adequate ventilation and high levels of natural light for health, coupled with the need to build cheap, portable schools. Dr Eleanor Bourne had been appointed the first Medical Inspector of Schools in 1911 and under her instruction the relationship between classroom environment and child health was given prominence. Subsequently, school architecture evolved through iteration and experimentation to improve interior light and ventilation. The open-air annexe type achieved maximum ventilation and natural light; it comprised one large room and had only one wall, the western verandah wall. The other sides were open with only adjustable canvas blinds for enclosure. Ideally, they were high-set, thereby increasing the ventilation and providing further shelter underneath. The design was praised by educationalists as conducive to the good health of students.

Dutton Park State School's open-air annexe was opened by the Minister for Education, Herbert Hardacre, and the Home Secretary, John Huxham, at an official ceremony on 29 July 1916. The building was 51 by 21 feet (15.5 m × 6.4 m) with a 10-foot (3.0 m) west-facing verandah; while a 5-foot (1.5 m) gangway along one side of the Annexe connected it to another building. The open-air annexe, a highset timber building on brick piers, had a Dutch-gable, iron roof, and a verandah with decorative timber brackets to its six-bay of perimeter posts. The interior had a coved ceiling lined with pressed metal. The building accommodated 140 students. Constructed by day labour, the open-air annexe cost £969 19s 3d, including its embanked site and furniture.

However, open-air annexes proved to be inadequate because the open sides provided limited weather protection and climate control, and the canvas blinds deteriorated quickly. The building type was discontinued in 1923, after many had been constructed across Queensland. All were modified to provide better enclosure. In 1925, the Dutton Park Girls and Infants School's open-air annexe was enclosed with sliding sash windows, a typical modification of open-air annexes in Queensland schools in the 1920s.

In the 1920s and 1930s, substantial changes to the school grounds occurred. In 1925, the railway cutting that divided the Dutton Park schools was widened, requiring relocation of the northern wing of the original 1886 boys school. In 1927, the school reserve was extended to the south, through resumption of a triangular portion of the jail reserve. In the following years, improvements were made to the grounds including drainage, fencing, and landscaping, and a pedestrian pathway was created along the southern boundary of the school, which is now the driveway from Annerley Road. In 1930, nine Depression relief workers employed under the Queensland Government's Unemployment Relief Scheme, administered by the DPW during the Great Depression (1929–1930s), were improving the playing grounds and preparing a playing field.

In 1933, concern about decreased enrolments at the girls and infants and boys schools led to discussion by the school committee of amalgamation of the schools. It was proposed that, due to the recent improvements to its grounds and modernisation of its classrooms, the boys school should be the site of the amalgamated school.

By 1934, the decision to locate the Dutton Park State School at the boys school site had been made. Plans to accommodate the increased student population were created in 1934. These included extension of an existing building to provide an extra classroom and a teachers room; relocation of the open-air annexe (1916) to the boys school site; and construction of two concrete toilet blocks. The Girls and Infants school site, north of the railway line became an opportunity school.

The open-air annexe was relocated to its present site, and re-oriented to face north, in time for the commencement of the 1935 school year. A drawing shows the building contained three classroom separated by folding partitions with doors, verandahs on three sides and hat rooms at the ends of verandahs. The side verandahs (east and west) were additions. Along the north verandah wall, doors were relocated into new openings, and a double hung window with fanlight was added. A new, VJ timber-lined ceiling replaced the pressed metal one. Stairs were centrally located from the verandah. Toilets were added to the understorey in 1936.

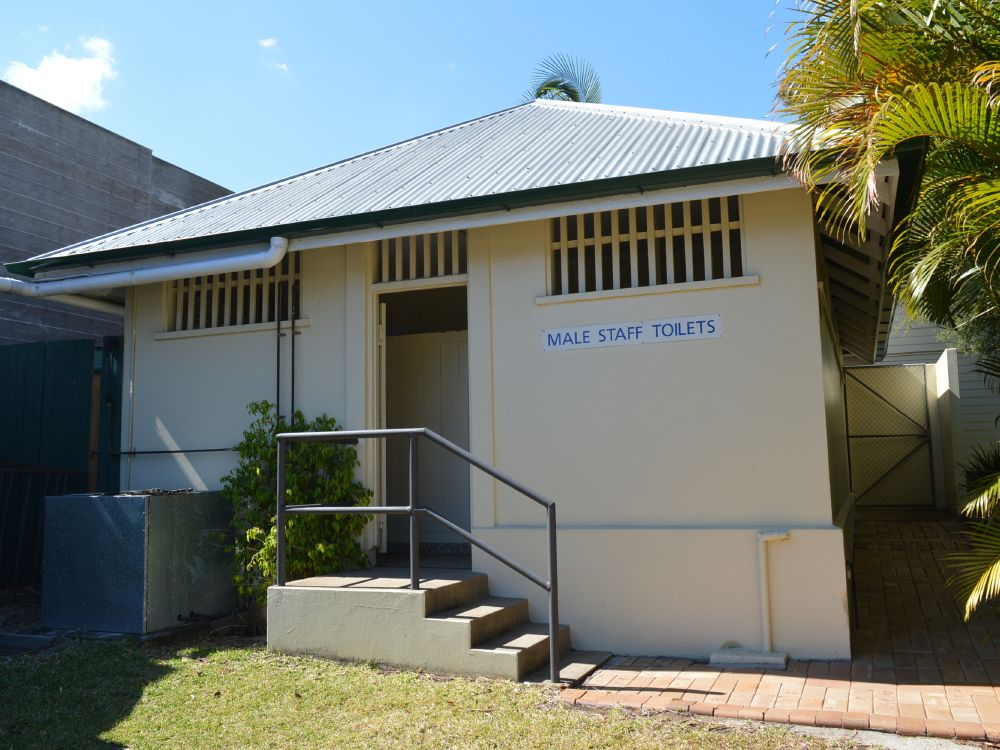
Interwar concrete toilet block, northwest elevation, 2018

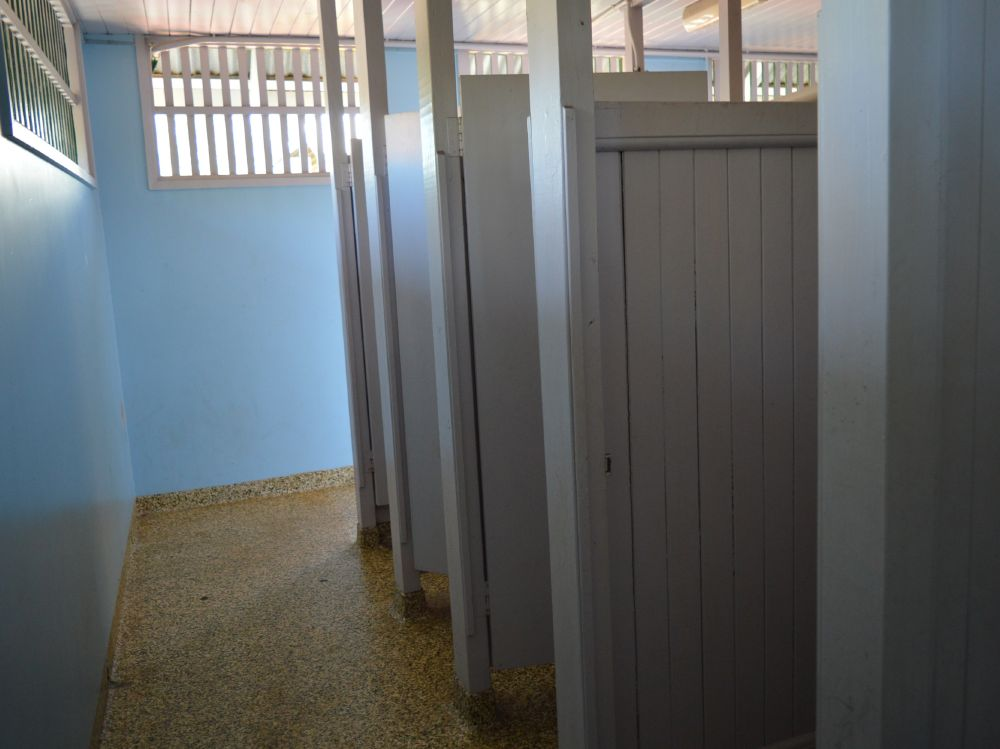
Girls interwar concrete toilet block interior showing early partitions and openings with timber batten screens, 2018

From January 1935, the Dutton Park schools were amalgamated as Dutton Park Primary School, with 755 students enrolled. To provide up-to-date amenities to the newly combined school, two sewered interwar concrete toilet blocks were added to the site in 1936 at a cost of £1637. Detached brick or concrete toilet blocks were an uncommon addition to schools at this time, as detached toilet blocks were more likely constructed using timber, and most Depression-era brick school buildings included toilets in their understorey. Toilets were located underneath brick school buildings at: Norman Park State School, Ascot State School, and Wooloowin State School, while other schools such as Kangaroo Point State School had detached timber toilet blocks. Similar designs were produced in the same year for Babinda State School and Southport State School. They were lowset, single-storey structures, with concrete entry stairs. The elevations were well composed, comprising concrete plinths, in-situ concrete walls with high openings with timber batten screens, and hipped roofs. The interiors comprised VJ timber-lined and -panelled partitions, and timber batten screens and doors.

The addition of these toilet blocks resulted from the Queensland Government's plan to improve toileting amenities and sewerage connection at state schools during the Interwar period, and resulted from two government programmes. A DPW building programme to connect metropolitan state government buildings, including state school buildings, to the Brisbane City Council's sewerage system, commenced about 1924–25. Its aim was "to bring all sanitary conveniences up to the approved standard and to connect them with the Council's sewerage system, thus providing both the economical and hygienic advantages of the sewerage installation". The second initiative was the Queensland Government's Works Programme from 1932 to revive the building trade during the Great Depression, which included £250,000 allocated for the construction of new buildings throughout the State, including sewerage installations at schools. Other schools that received upgrades toilet facilities include Junction Park State School and Coorparoo State School.

An aerial image shows the school playing field had been completed by 1936, and a line of mature palm trees, delineated the school's Annerley Road boundary. A former student stated in 1984 that these palms were the original palms planted in 1908. The school logo, designed in 1959, included a representation of the palm trees planted in 1908 along the Annerley Road boundary.

The commencement of the Pacific theatre of war during World War II (WWII), in December 1941, with its threat to Australia, resulted in the Queensland Government closing all coastal state schools in January 1942. Most schools, including Dutton Park State School, reopened on 2 March 1942, but student attendance was optional until the war ended.

Typically during wartime, schools were a focus for civilian duty. At many schools, students and staff members grew produce and flowers for donation to local hospitals and organised fundraising and the donation of useful items to Australian soldiers on active service. In November 1942, Dutton Park State School children were collecting aluminium as part of the school's war effort. Students had already supplied 10 tons of rubber for salvage and grown 20,000 lettuce and cabbage seedlings in the school grounds. The fully grown vegetables were collected by the Red Cross.

After World War II, enrolments (Prep to Grade 5) at Dutton Park State School (485 students in 1945 reducing to 366 in 1951) were "comfortably accommodated in the existing classrooms". However, after Intermediate Schools for Year 6 and 7 students in Queensland closed in 1953, the Dutton Park State School's enrolment increased to 571 students by 1955.

To accommodate growth in enrolments, further changes to the open-air annexe were made in 1954, when the side, (east and west) verandahs were enclosed, and the side walls of the eastern and western classrooms were opened onto the side verandahs. The stairs were replaced with a new set of stairs, which were reoriented to face the opposite direction, and another set of stairs was added along the same elevation. The sliding windows (1925) on the southern elevation were retained and a casement window was added at each end of the enclosed verandahs. The hatrooms in the southeast and southwest corners were lined internally to match the classroom spaces. On the east and west ends of the north verandah, the verandah railing and floor fascia were removed and enclosed with stud walls to sill height with fixed, clear glass above to the top plate to create space for hats and bags, including hat and bag hooks under the window sills along the verandah wall. Additional double-hung windows were added to the northern verandah wall to form pairs of windows. Internally the coved ceiling form was retained, and the floors of the end verandahs were raised to be level with the classroom floors.

Additional improvements to the school grounds were made in the 1950s, when trees were planted for shade purposes. From 1953, most of the trees (Ficus spp.) along the Annerley Road boundary and those at the foot of the playing field steps were planted by the children on school Arbor Days. These plantings were made during/after 1953. A land exchange with the Boggo Road Gaol in 1971 swopped a portion of land on the southeast of the site, adjacent to the railway reserve, for a portion to the south of the school.

A fire in October 1973 destroyed the entire original 1886 Boys School Building. The open-air annexe, interwar concrete toilet blocks, and Blocks A and E survived the fire. In 1975, two classroom blocks (Blocks C & D) were built to replace the destroyed building.

Further changes were made to the open-air annexe. By 1985, bag racks had been added on the northern verandah, another set was added, and the partition doors were replaced with folding doors. In 1985, the northern verandah was converted into a wet room with sinks inserted at either end, vinyl flooring was added, and some windows and doors removed from the verandah wall. By this time, the understorey toilets had been modified and a groundsman's quarters added.

Throughout the school's existence, there has been community involvement in Dutton Park State School and the school has been the focus and site of community events. School fetes were held from c. 1911 and a fancy dress ball was held annually from c. 1935. The school's 50th Anniversary Jubilee was commemorated in 1935, with celebrations and a school reunion, held in conjunction with the official opening ceremony of the re-amalgamated schools. In 1984, the school's centenary was marked with school open days, a reunion dinner, a school fete and the publication of a school history. Another school history was published in 2009 to commemorate the school's 125th anniversary.

In 2018, Dutton Park State School continues to operate from its early site and has an enrolment of about 340 students. It retains a rare open-air annexe and two intact interwar concrete toilet blocks, set in landscaped grounds with assembly and play areas, sporting facilities, and mature trees. The school is important as a key social focus for the Dutton Park community as generations of students have been taught there and many social events held in the school's grounds and buildings since its establishment.

== Description ==
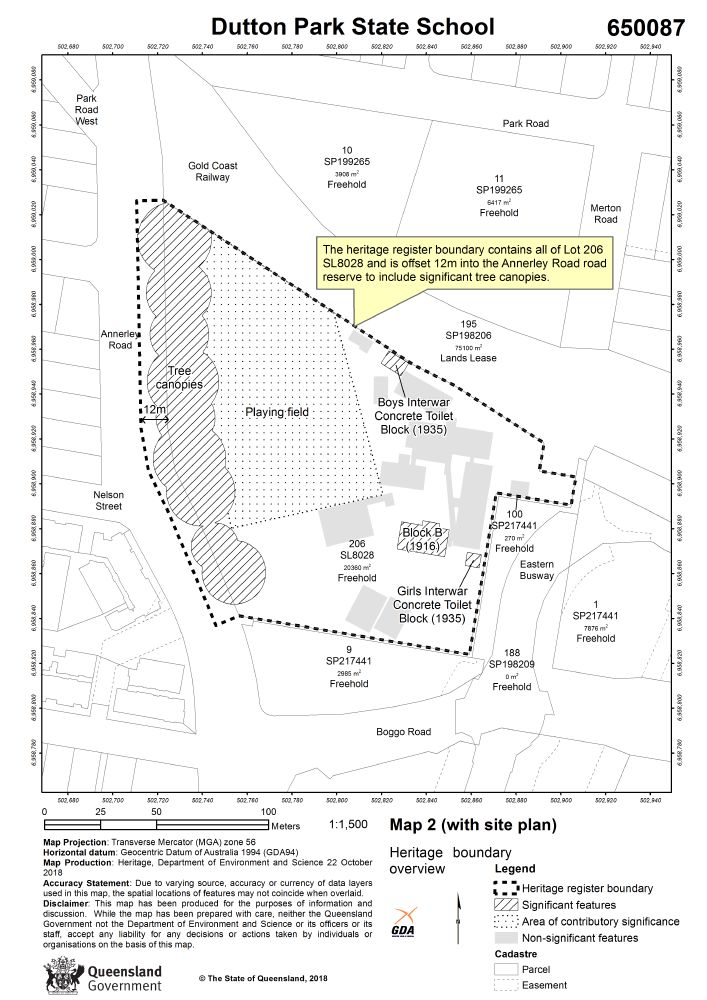
Site map, 2018

Dutton Park State School occupies a 2.036-hectare (5.03-acre) site in Dutton Park, a suburb approximately 2.67 km south of the Brisbane CBD. The school is accessed via a driveway connected to Annerley Road to the west and a walkway connected to the Boggo Road Busway to the east. The site is bounded on its other sides by a train line (northeast) and Dutton Park Police Station (south). A complex of teaching buildings stand on the eastern half of the site, with a large playing field occupying the western half, bordered by mature trees along Annerley Road.

The heritage-listed buildings of Dutton Park State School are:

- Block B: open-air annexe (1916, relocated to current site 1935 with alterations 1925, 1936, 1954 and 1985)
- Boys and Girls interwar concrete toilet blocks (1936)
- landscape features

Block B is a timber-framed, highset open-air annexe teaching building with a Dutch-gable roof and long sides facing north and south. The building has a north-facing verandah (now enclosed) accessing three, southern classrooms.

The Boys and Girls interwar concrete toilet blocks are two, highly intact, symmetrical, single storey toilet blocks that are located at the north and southeast site boundaries, respectively. They have well composed elevations comprising concrete plinths, in-situ concrete walls with high openings with timber batten screens, and hipped roofs. The Boys Interwar Concrete Toilet Block is larger and rectangular with its long sides facing northeast and southwest. The Girls Concrete Toilet Block is also rectangular with its long sides facing north and south. Each has a front entry accessed by concrete stairs with metal pipe railings and balustrades. Original access openings are to the short sides of the blocks, although these have been boarded over along the back entries.

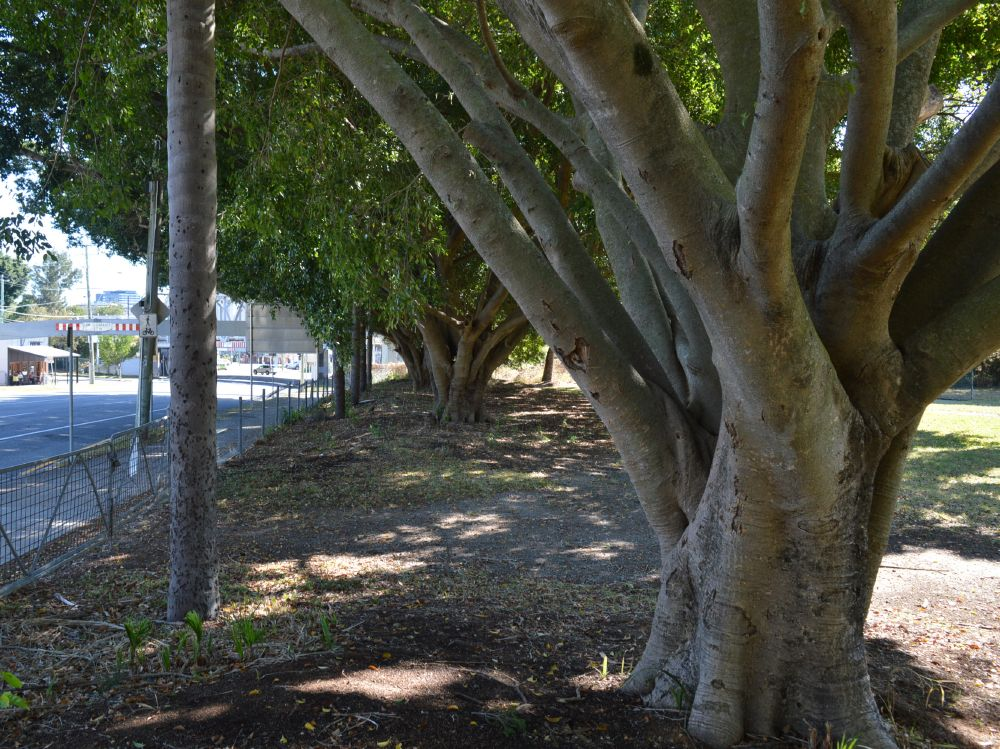
Mature fig and palm trees, looking north, 2018

The school grounds are well-established, with sporting facilities including a large playing field occupying the western half of the school site. Mature fig trees (Ficus benjamina) and cocos palm trees (Syagrus romanzoffiana) stand along the western, Annerley Road boundary of the site.

== Heritage listing ==
Dutton Park State School was listed on the Queensland Heritage Register on 30 November 2018 having satisfied the following criteria.

The place is important in demonstrating the evolution or pattern of Queensland's history.

Dutton Park State School (established as Woolloongabba State School in 1884) is important in demonstrating the evolution of state education and its associated architecture in Queensland. It retains representative examples of standard government designs that were architectural responses to prevailing government educational philosophies set in landscaped grounds with provision of play areas, sporting facilities and mature trees.

The open-air annexe (Block B, 1916) is a representative example demonstrating the medical and educational theories of the period, which valued fresh air and sunlight. The enclosure of the annexe in 1925 demonstrates standard adaptations to the open-air classroom type to improve its functionality.

Two interwar concrete toilet blocks (Girls and Boys, 1936) and the initial formation of the school playing field (1930) are a result of the Queensland Government's building and relief work programs during the 1930s that stimulated the economy and provided work for men unemployed as a result of the Great Depression.

The suburban site with mature trees, and play and sporting facilities, demonstrates the importance of play and aesthetics in the education of children.

The place is important in demonstrating the principal characteristics of a particular class of cultural places.

Dutton Park State School is important in demonstrating the principal characteristics of a Queensland state school. These include: teaching buildings constructed to standard Government designs that have classrooms with high levels of natural light and ventilation; generous landscaped grounds with shade trees and play areas; and toilet facilities.

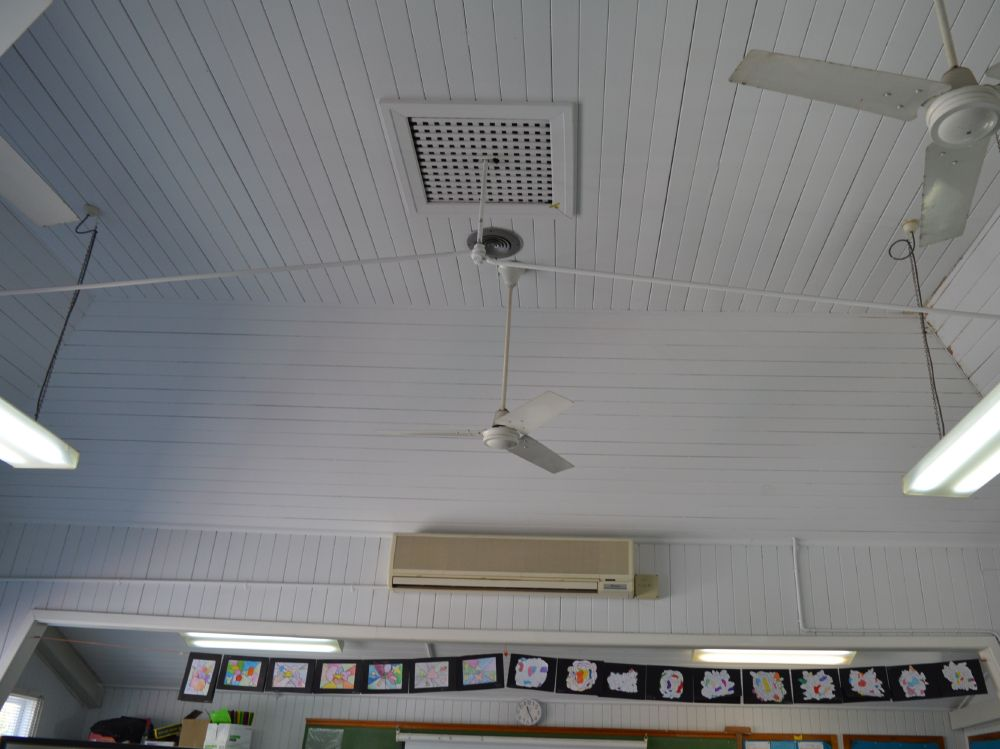
Block B classroom interior showing ceiling space and linings, 2018

The open-air annexe (Block B, 1916) is important in demonstrating the principal characteristics of its standard type designed by the Department of Public Works (DPW) and is a rare example. These characteristics include: highset, timber-framed construction; single skin verandah wall; northern verandah (now enclosed); internal, VJ timber linings; and coved ceiling with steel tie rods and VJ timber lining with timber lattice ceiling vents.

The open-air annexe is also important in demonstrating the principal characteristics of later, typical enclosures made to the standard type, including weatherboard cladding (exterior), VJ timber lining (interior) and timber-framed windows.

The interwar concrete toilet blocks (Girls and Boys, 1936) are important in demonstrating the principal characteristics of toilet blocks built on school sites during the interwar period, and are highly intact examples. These characteristics include: their discreet locations on the boundaries of the school site; lowset, single storey, in-situ concrete construction; concrete plinths; concrete entry stairs; VJ timber-lined and -panelled partitions; timber batten screens and doors; and hipped roofs.

The place has a strong or special association with a particular community or cultural group for social, cultural or spiritual reasons.

Dutton Park State School has a strong and ongoing association with former students, parents, staff members and the surrounding Dutton Park community. Operating since 1884, generations of students have been taught at the school. The place is important for its contribution to the educational development of Dutton Park and as a focus for the community.
