= Roger Hawken =

Australian engineer

Prof. Roger Hawken
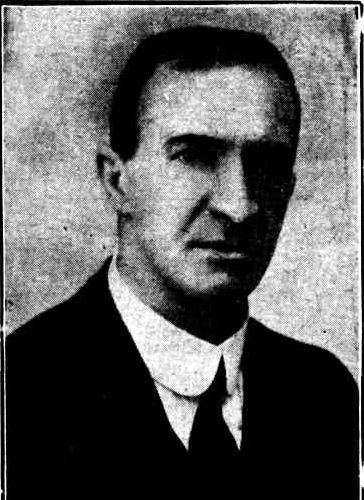
- Born: 12 May 1878; Darlington, New South Wales
- Died: 18 October 1947 (aged 69); Brisbane, Queensland
- Education: Newington College; University of Sydney
- Occupations: Engineer; lecturer; professor
- Spouse: Adelaide Margrette (née Mott)
- Children: 5 daughters
- Parent(s): Nicholas Hawken MLC and Mary Jane (née Vance)

Roger William Hercules Hawken (12 May 1878 – 18 October 1947), an Australian engineer, was the first lecturer in civil engineering, and then a professor, at the University of Queensland.

== Personal life ==
Hawken was born at Darlington, New South Wales, the son of Nicholas Hawken MLC and Mary Jane (née Vance). He attended Newington College (1893–1896) and in 1895 won the Wigram Allen Scholarship, awarded by Sir George Wigram Allen, for mathematics. His tertiary education was at the University of Sydney (B.C.E., 1900; B.A., 1902). He also received a Masters of Engineering from the University of Sydney.

He died on 18 October 1947 after a week's illness and was cremated at Mt Thompson Crematorium. He was survived by his wife and five daughters.

== Professional life ==
Hawken's academic bent was evident by 1903 in a remarkably advanced paper to the Sydney University Engineering Society on the structural analysis of bridges.

Hawken worked as an engineer in the Federated Malay States for four years and then with local government authorities in New South Wales. In 1912 Hawken was appointed as a lecturer at the University of Queensland.

He graduated M.C.E. from Sydney in 1918 after submitting a thesis on column design, a frontier topic of the period, and appears to have had slightly the better of a lively argument with the English engineer, E. H. Salmon, who had written an authoritative text on the subject.

Hawken was appointed as professor at the University of Queensland in 1919.

Hawken was involved in the founding of IEAust in 1919 and was its president in 1923 and a councillor till his death. At his suggestion in 1928, Queensland became the first state to legislate for compulsory registration of consulting engineers.

In the 1920s, he turned again to earth pressures and the stability of slopes; he thus was one of the pioneers of the study of soil mechanics, a subject generally neglected until the 1950s. In later work on rainfall runoff and flooding potential and the economic appraisal of engineering schemes, his ideas were well ahead of his time.

Hawken was reserved but excessively formal, with a wry, sometimes biting sense of humour. Engineering and the university was his life. He saw the complete engineer as a combination of wide experience and wide culture, encouraged originality in his students, called himself the 'senior student' and was known as 'hanks'.

His work included design of an early version of the Sydney Harbour Bridge that did not proceed to construction, and identification of crossing points for the Brisbane River. He was involved in many major Brisbane projects including an early Victoria Bridge (the abutment is still standing near QPAC) and the Story Bridge. In 2006, Brisbane City Council proposed Hawken Bridge as one of 5 names for a new green bridge linking the University of Queensland to Dutton Park but ended up choosing the name Eleanor Schonell Bridge.

In May 1947, he was asked to participate in an inquiry into a railway crash at Camp Mountain.

== Named in his honour ==
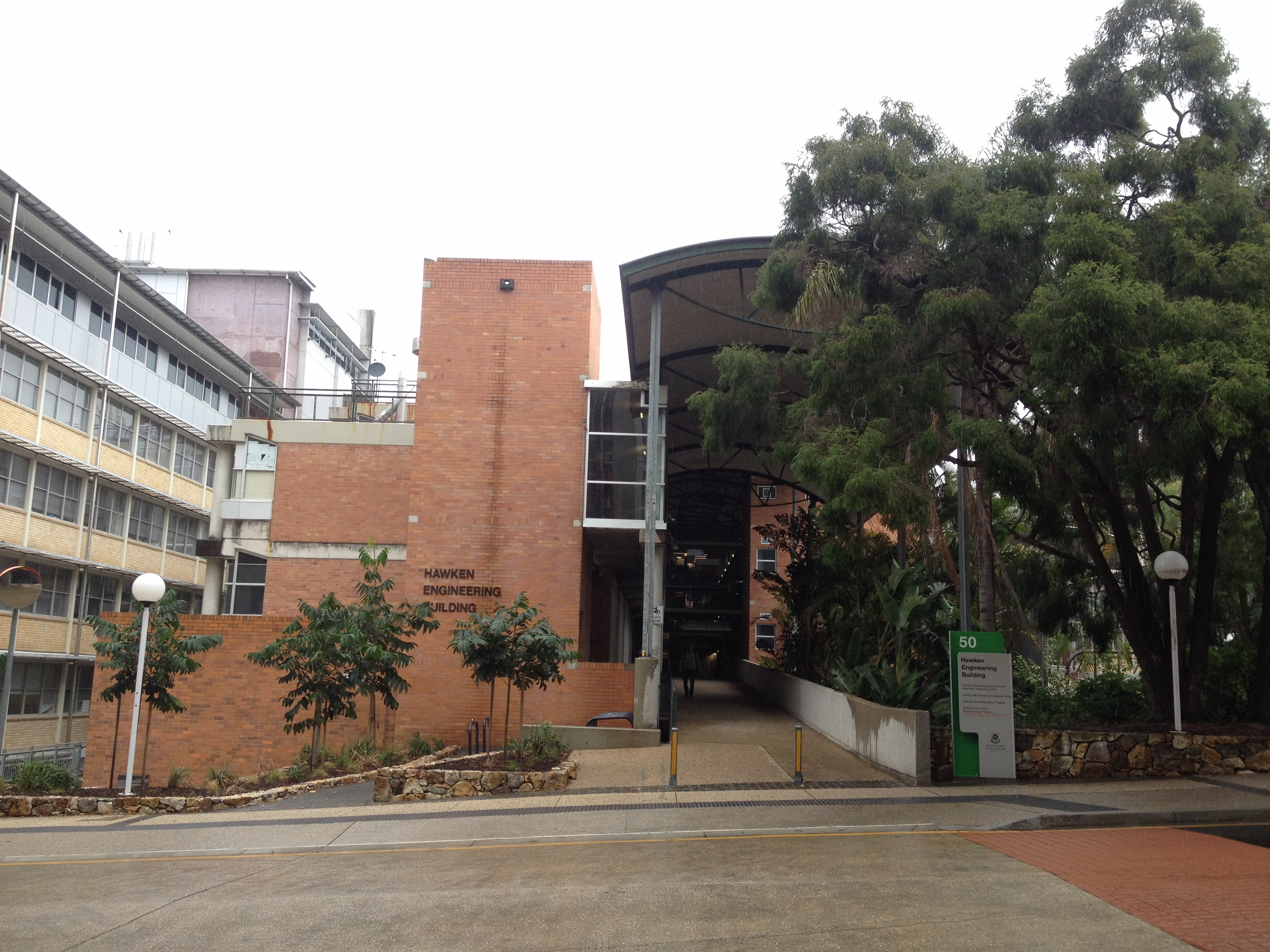
Hawken Engineering Building

Two major engineering buildings and library at the University of Queensland have been named in his honour. The first Hawken building was built in about 1964. However it was vacated by the Engineering Faculty after the construction of a new building in about the 1990s. The name Hawken Building was then assigned to the new building, and the old Hawken Building was renamed the Prentice Building, reflecting the Prentice Computer Centre which took over the building.

The annual Hawken address, presented by the Queensland division of IEAust, is usually held in its Hawken Auditorium, the main lecture theatre in the Hawken Building.

Shortly after his death in 1947, a road leading to the main UQ campus at St Lucia, Queensland (then known as Coronation Drive) was renamed Hawken Drive.
