= Mary Hegarty (scientist) =

Irish-American psychologist

- Education: Carnegie Mellon University; University College Dublin
- Scientific career
- Workplaces: University of California, Santa Barbara

Mary Hegarty is an Irish–American psychologist who is a professor at the University of California, Santa Barbara. Her research considers spatial thinking in complex processes. She is a Fellow of the American Psychological Association and the American Association for the Advancement of Science.

== Early life and education ==
Hegarty was an undergraduate and graduate student at University College Dublin. After graduating, she stayed in Ireland for three years, working as a research assistant at St Patrick's College, before moving to the United States for her doctoral research. She joined Carnegie Mellon University as a doctoral researcher.

== Research and career ==
Hegarty was appointed to the faculty at the University of California, Santa Barbara. Her research considers spatial thinking, and how it is involved in complex psychological processes. She has demonstrated that eye fixation data can be used to understand mechanical reasoning (e.g. interpretation of graphics). Eye-fixation data allows Hegarty to follow the processes involved in understanding diagrams and maps. Hegarty is interested in individual differences in navigation, learning the layout of environments, mental rotation and taking perspective. She has investigated why people with great spatial abilities are more successful in STEM-related disciplines.

== Awards and honours ==
- 2001 Elected Fellow of the American Psychological Association
- 2022 Elected Fellow of the American Association for the Advancement of Science

== Selected publications ==
- Akira Miyake; Naomi P Friedman; David A Rettinger; Priti Shah; Mary Hegarty (1 December 2001). "How are visuospatial working memory, executive functioning, and spatial abilities related? A latent-variable analysis". Journal of Experimental Psychology. 130 (4): 621–640. doi:10.1037/0096-3445.130.4.621. ISSN 0096-3445. PMID 11757872. Wikidata Q52015623.
- M. Hegarty; M.A. Just (December 1993). "Constructing Mental Models of Machines from Text and Diagrams". Journal of Memory and Language. 32 (6): 717–742. doi:10.1006/jmla.1993.1036. ISSN 0749-596X. Wikidata Q62714859.
- Thomas Wolbers; Mary Hegarty (6 February 2010). "What determines our navigational abilities?". Trends in Cognitive Sciences. 14 (3): 138–146. doi:10.1016/j.tics.2010.01.001. ISSN 1364-6613. PMID 20138795. Wikidata Q37688619.
