= Fred Schonell =

Australian academic

Sir Fred Joyce Schonell (3 August 1900 – 22 February 1969) was an Australian educationist, and vice-chancellor of the University of Queensland from 1960 to 1969.

== Career ==
Schonell graduated from the University of Western Australia in 1925, at the same time as his wife-to-be, Florence Eleanor de Bracey Waterman; the couple married the next year. Eleanor, as she was always known, was a close collaborator with Schonell, and a noted educationalist in her own right. In 1928 they left for England. Schonell studied at King's College London and the London Day Training College, University of London; his Ph.D. thesis was on the diagnosis and remediation of difficulties in spelling. In 1942 he was appointed professor of education at the University College of Swansea, University of Wales, where he is noted as having brought new life to a department suffering from the effects of wartime privation. His research interests focused on reading difficulties, primarily but not exclusively in primary school children. Two books date from these years: Backwardness in the Basic Subjects (Edinburgh, 1942) and The Psychology and Teaching of Reading (Edinburgh, 1945).

Schonell was appointed Professor of Education at the University of Birmingham in 1947, where he established a remedial education centre. His research interests at this time were many and various: methods of teaching English to boys, the library borrowings of children, children's reading interests, selection criteria for entrants for the teaching profession, and English and history teaching methodologies. A particular interest was always 'the backward reader'; he was founding director of a remedial education centre in the city, where research and student training took place alongside remedial teaching. In 1948, he established a journal, Educational Review.

In 1950, Schonell returned to Australia, where he became founding professor of education at the University of Queensland. In 1952 facilitated the opening of a remedial education centre with a former student from Birmingham. Research interests included the language of Australian labourers, the education of young Aborigines, the failure of above-average intelligence children in school, and the social and educational problems of migrants' children.

He wrote two series of books for children. The Happy Venture series, noted for the characters Dick and Dora, and the Wide Range series, were written from the late 1930s till the early 1950s. Both were widely used as school books throughout the British Commonwealth for many years. Schonell's wife Eleanor and others contributed to the series. From the late 1940s, Schonell worked with English teacher-turned-author Phyllis Flowerdew on several primary school readers, including the successful Wide Range Readers.

From the late 1940s onwards, Schonell worked on a reading test which became one of the most widely used in the English-speaking world; the ability to read a range of words of increasing difficulty was translated into a reading age, which would then be taken as a score reading ability. The test is still in use (2017).

He was knighted in 1962.

== Schonell Reading Tests ==
The Schonell Reading Tests are a series of 7 achievement tests relating to vocabulary and reading. The tests were published by Schonell in the 1940s to measure vocabulary development and reading comprehension.

Schonells' Graded Word Reading Test (1945) presents 100 words that a subject has to pronounce. Each word is associated with a difficulty level that represents an age between 5 and 15. The highest score a subject can score is "reading age 12".

The Schonell Reading Tests are criticised by scholars for being "antiquated", "frequently misapplied [to] adults", "inadequate", and "out-of-date". Teale pointed out in his 1984 analysis that "its potential was destroyed by tempering", referring to the 1940s study which originally involved only children aged up to 7.5, with the higher age ranges extrapolated from the progression seen between 5 and 7. In an episode of More or Less, Tim Harford and Kathy Rastle (University of London) referred to the tests as "very old" and "not necessarily representative" for use on adults in the 21st century.

== Legacy ==
Many buildings on the University of Queensland campus are named after him and his wife, Lady (Eleanor) Schonell. St Lucia Road, which leads to the university campus, was renamed in his honour as Sir Fred Schonell Drive.
