= Jim Mooney (disambiguation) =

Jim Mooney (1919–2008) was an American comic book artist.

Jim or James Mooney may also refer to:

- Jim Mooney (baseball) (1906–1979), pitcher for the St. Louis Cardinals and New York Giants
- Jim Mooney (basketball) (1930–2015), American basketball player for the Philadelphia Warriors
- Jim Mooney (American football) (1907–1944), American football player
- Jim Mooney (Australian politician) (1923–2007), Australian politician
- James Mooney (1861–1921), American anthropologist
- James D. Mooney (1884–1957), American business executive
- James Mooney (Queensland politician) (c. 1829–1873), alderman in the Brisbane Municipal Council
- Jim Mooney (Florida politician) Florida politician
