= Ronald Ridout =

English writer of textbooks (1916– 1994)

Ronald Joseph Ridout (23 July 1916 – 5 December 1994) was a prolific English writer of school textbooks. His textbooks include the hugely successful series English Today. He had a significant impact on India, where his textbooks were widely assigned in schools. In her 1997 Booker Prize-winning novel, The God of Small Things, Arundhati Roy refers to children reading "Ronald Ridout Workbooks" along with Rudyard Kipling's Jungle Book.

== Biography ==
Ronald Ridout was born in Farnham, Surrey, on 23 July 1916. He was the son of Gilbert Harry Ridout, a schoolmaster, and Ethel Mary née Phillips. He married Betty Elsie Dolley on 10 February 1940, and had three children, Jessica, Simon and Veronica. He worked as a bank clerk at the National Provincial Bank, Alton, Hampshire, from 1933 to 1935 and received his B.A. degree with honours from Oxford University in 1939. From 1939 to 1950 he worked as a teacher at schools in Bolton, Luton, Nuneaton, Portsmouth, Shrewsbury and Woking. He was dissatisfied with the available material for the teaching of English at the time that he started his teaching career, and as a result developed the English Today series of textbooks in the 1940s. He worked at Ginn & Co. Ltd., London, the publishers of English Today, from 1946 to 1950, as a publisher's representative. The enormous success of the English Today books led to him leaving the classroom in 1950 to devote his time to writing. From 1950 until his death, he worked exclusively as a writer. Ridout collaborated with Phyllis Flowerdew on a number of primary school readers during the 1960s for the publishers Oliver and Boyd. He died in South Africa on 5 December 1994. So prolific was his output and huge his sales, exceeding seventy million, that he earned a place in The Guinness Book of World Records. His daughter Jessica lives in Worcestershire.

== Quotations ==
"What we must do is to steer between these two extremes and develop a way of speaking that most effectively expresses what we want to say. We want a speech that will do its job well. Everything that does its job well has a beauty of its own. Hence we talk of a beautiful runner, a beautiful dancer, a beautiful engine. They all have functional beauty, the beauty of functioning perfectly, the beauty of being perfectly suited to the job they have to do. So with speech: we want an instrument that is beautiful, not because it puts on decorative airs, but because it does its work beautifully, perfectly."

From English Today, Ronald Ridout, Ginn & Company, 1947, pp. 111–112

== Bibliography ==
(selected bibliography)

A. to Z. of English, (with Michael Tristram, Neil Straker and Timothy Jaques), Collins - ISBN 0-246-12707-4
Better English (1961) Ginn & Company, (reprinted 2000 by Heinemann ISBN 0-602-20243-4)
Book for Me to Read (with Ruth Ainsworth), Series, Purnell Bancroft
Children's Dictionary (1983) Collins ISBN 0-246-12237-4
English Now, Books 1 - 5, Ginn & Company
English Today, Books 1 - 5 (1947), Ginn & Company
English Workbooks, Books 1 - 8, Ginn & Company
English Workbooks for the Caribbean, Books 1 - 8, (1968) Ginn & Company
Evans Graded Verse (with Michael Knight) (1978), Evans Bros. ISBN 0-237-50202-X
Facts of English (with Clifford Witting) (1973) Macmillan Publishers ISBN 0-330-23534-6
Getting on with Dividing (with Michael Holt and Jon Miller) (1986) Collins ISBN 0-00-197335-5
Getting on with Mathematics (with Michael Holt and Jon Miller) (1986) Collins
Getting on with Multiplying (with Michael Holt and Jon Miller) (1986), Collins ISBN 0-00-197334-7
Getting on with Spelling, Series, (with Michael Holt and Leon Baxter), (1986), Collins
The Life Cycle of Cats (with Michael Holt), illustrated by Tony Payne. Grosset & Dunlap, (1974)
The Macmillan Dictionary of English Proverbs Explained (with Clifford Witting), Macmillan Publishers
Now I Can Spell (with Michael Holt) (1987) Collins ISBN 0-00-197431-9
Now I Can Take Away (1985), Collins ISBN 0-00-197138-7
Now I Can Write, Series, (with Michael Holt) (1987), Collins
Picture Words (1975), Collins ISBN 0-583-30211-4
Ridout pocket spelling dictionary (1979) Ginn & Company ISBN 0-602-22370-9
Self Help English, Macmillan Publishers - ISBN 0-333-00181-8
Word Perfect (with George Adamson), Books 1 - 8, (1957–60) Ginn & Company
Write in English, Books 1 - 8, (1974) Ginn & Company
