= Florence Eleanor Schonell =

Florence Eleanor Schonell (31 October 1902 – 22 May 1962) was a Colony of Natal-born Australian educational scientist known for her work with children affected by cerebral palsy and dyslexia.

The daughter of Francis William de Bracey Waterman, an English-born furniture dealer, and Maud Rebecca Turner, she was born Florence Eleanor de Bracey Waterman in Durban. She moved to Perth and trained as a teacher in Claremont. From 1923 to 1926, she taught primary school in Subiaco and Jolimont. She received a BA from the University of Western Australia in 1925. She married Fred Schonell in Perth the following year; the couple had two children. She travelled to England with her husband in 1928. She received a BA in 1938 and an MA in 1940 from University College London.

With her husband, Schonell developed standardized testing methods for measuring academic achievement in children; these were published in Diagnostic and Attainment Testing in 1950. In the same year, she received a PhD from the University of Birmingham. With Professor J. M. Smellie, she developed procedures for measuring intellectual and academic characteristics of children with cerebral palsy. Schonell also helped establish the Carlson House School for Spastics in 1948 and worked as a part-time educational psychologist there.

She returned to Australia, where she worked with the Queensland Spastic Children's Welfare League, serving on its medical and educational house committee from 1951 to 1961. In 1956, Schonell published Educating Spastic Children.

She died in Brisbane at the age of 59 from a cerebral glioma.

The Eleanor Schonell Bridge was named in her honour.
