= Phyllis Flowerdew =

British writer (1913–1994)

Phyllis May Flowerdew
- Born: 9 January 1913; Halifax, West Riding of Yorkshire, United Kingdom
- Died: 1994 (aged 80–81)

Phyllis May Flowerdew (9 January 1913 – 10 May 1994) was one of the most successful writers of children's educational books in the UK and British Commonwealth; it is estimated that her 'Wide Range Reader' series sold well over seven million copies between 1948 and her death in 1994.

== Biography ==
She was born in Halifax, Yorkshire, United Kingdom.

Flowerdew trained as a primary school teacher at Southlands College in south London, and spent the Second World War years teaching in South Africa; her experiences there provided plentiful material for her storytelling and writing career. On her return to Britain, she taught in schools in Oxfordshire until the late 1950s when she became a full-time author. Soon after her return, she was asked by the Edinburgh publisher Oliver and Boyd (now part of the Longman Publishing Group itself part of Pearson Education) to work with the Australian educationalist Fred Schonell. Schonell, in collaboration with his wife Eleanor, had recently published two series of elementary reading books for children: 'The Happy Venture' and 'Wide Range' series, using the highly controlled accumulated vocabulary for which he became famous. Oliver and Boyd saw the need to put Schonell together with a skilled storyteller; the resulting partnership with Flowerdew proved successful, with the publication in 1948 of the first 'Wide Range Readers' and then from 1954 onwards, the 'Happy Venture Library Books'.

The 'Wide Range Reader' series were remarkably successful, running through several editions, and still in print in 2017. Oliver and Boyd, and their successor publishers, then commissioned Flowerdew to write for them until the 1970s, and sought her active involvement in a third edition of the Readers in the early 1980s.

Flowerdew also collaborated with Sam Stewart, an editor at Oliver and Boyd in the 1958 publication of 'Reading On' and with another very prolific children's writer Ronald Ridout on the 'Reading to Some Purpose' series, 1961 onwards. Flowerdew also wrote many books on her own, e.g. the 'Flamingo' series, and the 'New Interest' series, 1972 onwards.

Flowerdew's success can be attributed to the very strict grading of language, which enables young readers to steadily and cumulatively build confidence, her storytelling ability and an eye for interesting material. Her writing included the purely fictional, the retelling of traditional stories, and non-fictional, the latter generally being historical, with a focus on the stories of individuals with courage and vision. In some cases, for example, the story of Mary Seacole in the New Interest Reader, helping rescue notable people from obscurity.
