= Kathleen Rastle =

Cognitive psychologist

- Occupation: Professor of Cognitive Psychology
- Known for: Research on reading and learning to read.
- Awards: Economic and Social Research Council ‘Celebrating Impact’ Prize for International Impact (2020); British Psychological Society Cognitive Section Prize (2018); Experimental Psychology Society Mid-Career Prize (2017)

Academic background
- Education: Pomona College (BA); Macquarie University (PhD)

Academic work
- Discipline: Psychology
- Sub-discipline: Reading
- Institutions: Royal Holloway, University of London
- Website: Faculty Page

Kathleen Rastle is a cognitive psychologist and Professor of Cognitive Psychology at Royal Holloway, University of London where she was previously the Head of Department of Psychology (2015-2019). Her research has made fundamental contributions to understanding of reading and learning to read.

== Education ==
Rastle undertook her PhD with Professor Max Coltheart at Macquarie University, where she contributed to the development of the DRC model of reading, a computational theory of how adults read aloud single words.

== Career ==
Subsequently, her work has focused on the statistical regularities present in written language, and on how learners acquire knowledge of these through instruction and experience.

She has been particularly interested in understanding how written language conveys meaningful (morphological) information and in how skilled, adult readers use this information in the initial stages of word recognition.

Rastle won the British Psychological Society Cognitive Section Prize (2018) and the Experimental Psychology Society Mid-Career Prize (2017). She is a fellow of the Academia Europaea, Academy of Social Sciences, and the British Psychological Society. Rastle was President of the Experimental Psychology Society and the Editor in Chief of the Journal of Memory and Language. Her research has received funding from the Economic and Social Research Council, Leverhulme Trust, British Academy, Royal Society, and Biotechnology and Biological Sciences Research Council.

== Influence ==
Rastle’s research has influenced policy and practice globally in the area of reading instruction. These impacts were recognised through an Economic and Social Research Council ‘Celebrating Impact’ Prize for International Impact (2020) which she won alongside Kate Nation and Anne Castles for their work on ending the reading wars.
