= South Brisbane Cemetery =

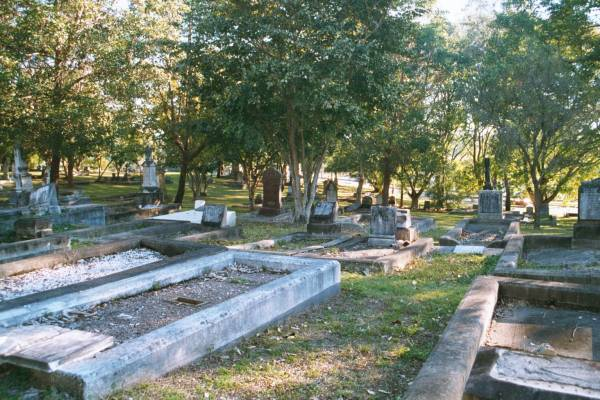
- South Brisbane Cemetery

- Location within Queensland
- 27.4994°S 153.0253°E
- Location: 21 Fairfield Road, Dutton Park, City of Brisbane, Queensland, Australia

History
- Design period: 1840s–1860s (mid-19th century)
- Built: 1870–1990s

Queensland Heritage Register
- Official name: South Brisbane Cemetery, Dutton Park Cemetery
- Type: state heritage (landscape, built)
- Designated: 1 October 2003
- Reference no.: 602406
- Significant period: 1870–1990s (fabric); 1870–1990s (historical use)
- Significant components: fence/wall – perimeter, gate – entrance, amenities building, headstone, trees/plantings, burial/grave, grave marker, toilet block/earth closet/water closet, memorial/monument, pathway/walkway, office/administration building, road/roadway, grave surrounds/railings

South Brisbane Cemetery, also known as Dutton Park Cemetery, is a heritage-listed cemetery at 21 Fairfield Road and Annerley Road, Dutton Park, City of Brisbane, Queensland, Australia, adjacent to the Brisbane River. It was built from 1870 to 1990s. It was added to the Queensland Heritage Register on 1 October 2003.

The cemetery was established in 1866 and remained in active use until the 1960s, after which its use has been limited by lack of space for new graves.

== History ==
In 1851, the residents of South Brisbane discovered (apparently to their surprise) that the government of New South Wales (before the separation of Queensland) had set aside around 5 acres of land for a general cemetery for South Brisbane. (In 2011 that land is the site of the West End State School.) However, no trustees were ever appointed and no burials occurred. In 1865, the Queensland Government decided to sell that site and use the proceeds towards another burial ground.

In 1866 a grant of 18 acres of land was made for the South Brisbane Cemetery by the Queensland Government. The original trustees were Thomas Blacket Stephens, Albert John Hockings, William Theophilus Blakeney, William Henry Baynes and James Mooney. The first person buried in the cemetery was Jane Hockings in July 1870.

Although Christian burials in Europe were traditionally clustered around churches, following the rise of urban populations in the late 18th and early 19th centuries, churchyards became inadequate for the numbers of burials required. After the example set by France, towns in Britain, and in Australia, set aside land on the outskirts of settlement as public cemeteries. This was thought to be healthier and provided a spacious, landscaped environment where monuments and plantings could be attractively set out. Brisbane's first public cemetery of this type was established at Milton in the 1840s though it has since been built over. Nundah cemetery was established in 1846 and Moggill in 1855.

The area now that is now known as Dutton Park was originally thickly timbered and cut by steep gullies. A rough track from Woolloongabba to Ipswich passed through it. Some farms were established in the 1840s, the road was surveyed and a bridge across the river was built in the 1860s, but there were few houses.

In 1863 the area around Dutton Park was surveyed. A large recreation reserve was set aside, and then divided into recreation and cemeteries reserves by a later survey. The Cemetery Act of 1865 provided for the government to set up general cemeteries under the control of local trustees and South Brisbane Cemetery was established in 1866 under Trustees Thomas Blacket Stephens, Albert J Hocking, William T Blakeney, William M Baynes and James Mooney. The cemetery was officially declared open on 7 May 1870. The first burial took place on 1 August 1870 and was that of Jane Hockings, mother of cemetery trustee Albert Hockings.

The South Brisbane Cemetery was one of several government reserves in the area. A public park runs along its northern boundary and there were reserves for a pound, a gaol, an asylum and an orphanage in the vicinity. As public transport became available more people moved to the area. A railway station was opened at Boggo Junction in 1884 and the first horse-drawn bus service linking the area with the city began in 1890. The main road and the railway pass close to the cemetery, which was important in providing access for funeral corteges and for those visiting graves before private transport was common.

A Caretakers Cottage was built in 1881 and in 1888 handsome entrance gates, railings and a boundary wall were designed by the noted architect AB Wilson and were built by W Reid at a cost of £662.

In 1904 permission was given to add an area of 7 acres on the south side of Cornwall Street to the cemetery reserve. This was an area that had been surveyed for residential subdivision and adding it to the reserve effectively closed a section of Cornwall Street.

In 1891 R Wilcock carried out extensions to the boundary wall to AB Wilson's design.

The cemetery was enlarged in 1904 by the addition of 7 acres on the south side of Cornwall Street.

In 1908 a tramline reached the area with a terminus close to the cemetery at the corner of Gladstone and Cornwall Roads. The area developed rapidly in the 1900s and in 1914 it was renamed Dutton Park in honour of C B Dutton, Secretary of Public Lands between 1883 and 1887. By the late 1920s, the suburb was considered fashionable. The Greater Brisbane Council was created in 1925 by amalgamating the metropolitan councils of Brisbane and South Brisbane. The Brisbane City Council assumed the management of public cemeteries in the metropolitan area, including the South Brisbane Cemetery, in August 1930.

In 1930 that section of Cornwall Street (now within the cemetery) was closed as a public road.

In 1939 the Brisbane City Council embarked on an extensive programme of works at the cemetery. Over the next few years, concrete paths were laid, internal roads upgraded and kerbing installed. 60 feet (18 m) of stone wall was constructed within the cemetery and a new chain wire fence erected from the existing iron railings in Cornwall Street to the cemetery corner. Two modern brick toilet blocks were constructed in 1941 at a cost of £500. Frank Costello, City Architect between 1941 and 1952, probably designed these. Alterations and repairs were also carried out to the Sexton's cottage and waiting shed. The landscaping at the cemetery was improved with the planting of many trees and shrubs, including cypress pines and blue gums along the Brisbane River.

Work on the cemetery was halted by wartime shortages of labour and materials, but recommenced in 1945 when a survey of the cemetery noted lavatory blocks for men and women, two shelter sheds, a timber sexton's cottage, a timber tool room, motor shed and men's room. A brick staff amenities block was constructed in 1954.

The memorials in the cemetery range from those of prominent early residents, displaying fine examples of the mason's skill, to those of prisoners from nearby Brisbane Gaol, including that of bushranger Patrick Kenniff, who was hanged in 1902. The memorials in the cemetery reflect post World War II immigration and the cultural mix of the South Brisbane area in the second half of the 20th century. These include Greek and Italian graves and those of the many Russians who first settled around Woolloongabba and South Brisbane in the 1920s, following the Communist takeover in Russia. The cemetery also contains the graves of 50 soldiers who died in World War II.

Regular visiting of graves to tend them has become less common in our society, as has burial itself. In the 19th century cremation was rare, but through the 20th century it has become steadily more common. Cemeteries established since 1950 have been of the lawn cemetery type with plaques laid flush with the ground, precluding the wide variety of memorials in earlier cemeteries such as that at South Brisbane. The cemetery was closed to new burials in 1961–1962, but continuing use of family plots is permitted and a small number of new plots were released in 1998–1999. In 1996 the Sexton's cottage burned down and the shelter sheds have not survived.

=== War Graves ===
There are 52 Commonwealth service personnel buried in this cemetery whose graves are registered by the Commonwealth War Graves Commission, 13 from World War I and 39 from World War II.

=== Current Use ===
By the early 1960s, the cemetery was effectively full and the cemetery was closed. However, as with most closed cemeteries, additional burials and interment of ashes in existing family graves continued to occur. Some additional plots were released in the cemetery in the 1990s.

== Description ==
The South Brisbane Cemetery occupies a large area of undulating land sloping from the ridge at Annerley Road, Dutton Park to T J Doyle Memorial Drive on the edge of the Brisbane River. It has gullies in the central section and the layout of graves and plantings is dictated to a large extent by this undulating quality of the land.

The cemetery, as a special memorial area, is bounded by walls and fences. The main entrance is on Annerley Road and has formal gates flanked by Iron railings in the form of spears set into a low sandstone wall. The entrance is formed by a pair of wrought iron gates set between decorative sandstone pillars across the carriage way and a pedestrian gate. The gates match the railings and are composed of iron spears overlaid with a sinuous vine-like decoration. The entrance at Princess Street is not marked by special plantings.

Dividing left and right from the main drive are two curving drives. Although there is a formalised area of planting near the main entrance, the plantings are generally informal in layout, conforming to the terrain, and contain a great diversity of species, both indigenous and exotic. The burials are less informally arranged and are set closely in rows, as the land allows, with an east–west orientation. There are concrete paths between them and memorials of a wide variety of type, quality and age mark them. A number of the oldest memorials are large and elaborate displaying Victorian symbolism connected with death, such as broken columns, angels and vine leaves. Jane Hocking's burial, the oldest in the cemetery, is marked by the carved figure of an angel clinging to a cross atop a tapered column.

Service buildings constructed in the 1940s building programme survive. They comprise small brick toilet blocks, a brick building incorporating the walls and floor slab of a 1958 building, which was used as an office, store and garage, and a staff amenities block.

The cemetery contains a Trig marker, which was part of a triangulation survey of the South East region carried out by the government in 1883. This is located on the cemetery hill and is a sandstone block inscribed on top, which is now covered by a concrete path.

== Heritage listing ==
South Brisbane Cemetery was listed on the Queensland Heritage Register on 1 October 2003 having satisfied the following criteria.

The place is important in demonstrating the evolution or pattern of Queensland's history.

South Brisbane Cemetery is one of the earliest cemeteries in Queensland. It was established in 1866 and has been in use since 1870. In its form, memorials and plantings it provides evidence for the history of Brisbane and of European burial customs in Queensland.

The place has potential to yield information that will contribute to an understanding of Queensland's history.

South Brisbane Cemetery has the potential to reveal information on changes in burial customs of the 19th and 20th centuries and on the social fabric of the area it serves from evidence provided by the memorials and inscriptions it contains.

The place is important in demonstrating the principal characteristics of a particular class of cultural places.

South Brisbane Cemetery is a fine example of a public cemetery in use since 1870 and includes memorials ranging from those of prominent early residents to prisoners of Brisbane Gaol. The parklike setting of the cemetery, its elevated location to minimize health risk and its inclusion of all religious denominations are typical of late 19th century cemeteries.

The place is important because of its aesthetic significance.

South Brisbane Cemetery has aesthetic value as a picturesque public area comprising elements of landscape, mature trees, plantings, built structures and memorials. Many of the monuments in South Brisbane Cemetery have aesthetic significance due to the high quality of workmanship and design used in their construction.

The place has a strong or special association with a particular community or cultural group for social, cultural or spiritual reasons.

South Brisbane Cemetery has a special association with the community of Brisbane for social and spiritual reasons. It forms an essential component of the ritual of honouring and remembering the dead which continues to be important to the community.

== The Friends of South Brisbane Cemetery ==
The Friends of South Brisbane Cemetery (or FOSBC) is a not-for-profit community group dedicated to researching and protecting the South Brisbane Cemetery. The group was formed in 2005 by three local women who were concerned about the neglected state of the cemetery. During the following years they completed an enormous amount of work, tidying and recording every grave to create their own database of records. They also successfully lobbied the Brisbane City Council to return many old and discarded headstones that were exposed during construction of the neighbouring Eleanor Schonell Bridge.

The FOSBC became an incorporated association in May 2017.

The members conduct research on the graves and people in the cemetery, and have helped hundreds of people to locate relatives interred in the cemetery. The FOSBC also organise the popular 'Guardian Angels' community cleaning bees in the cemetery, which have attracted hundreds of participants.

== Notable burials ==
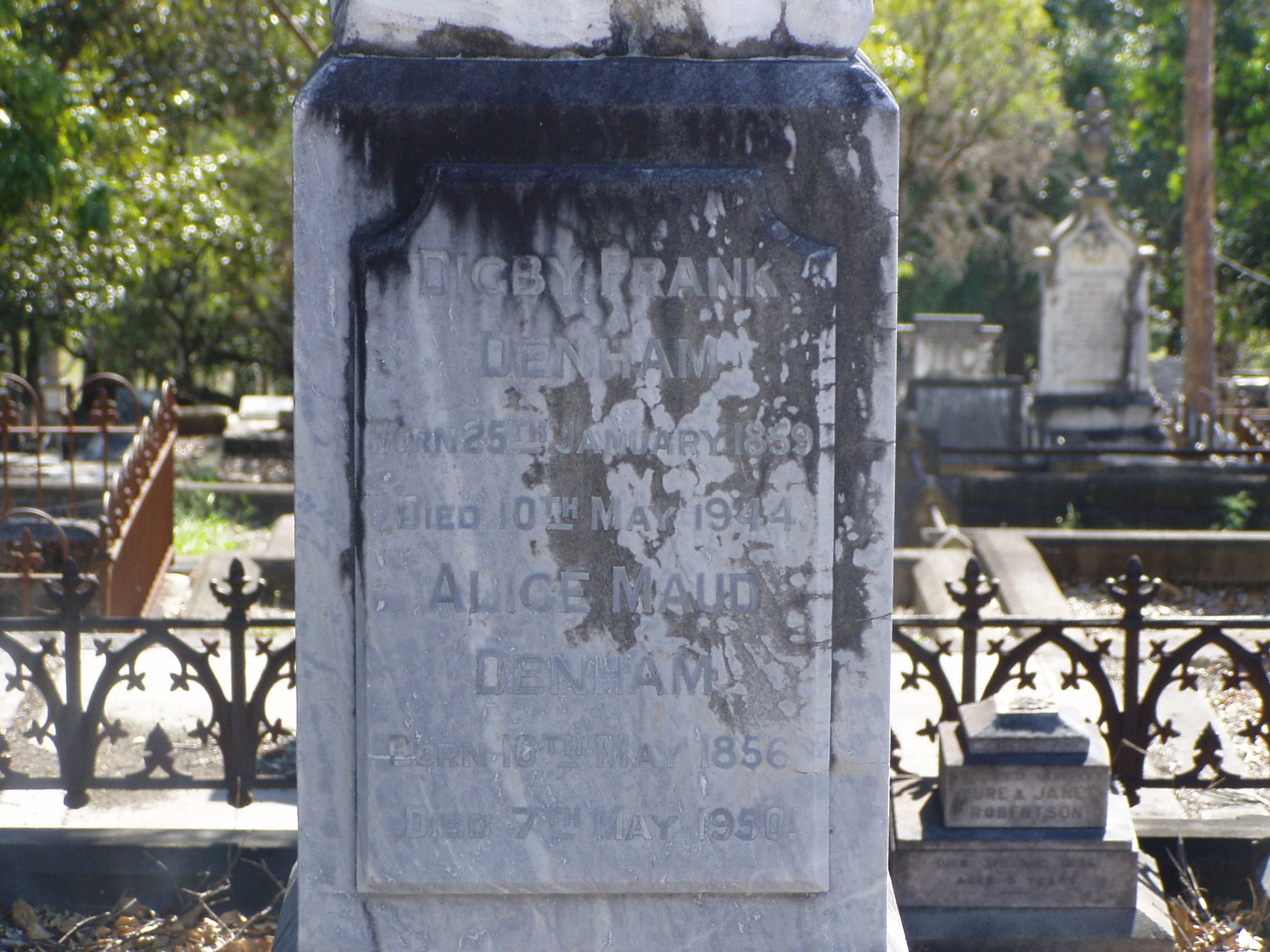
Digby Denham headstone, 2010

- See: Category:Burials at South Brisbane Cemetery
- Ernest Austin, last person to be hanged by the State of Queensland
- Eleanor Bourne, the first Queensland woman to study medicine
- Henry Challinor (1814–1882), physician and politician in the Colony of Queensland
- Digby Denham, politician and Premier of Queensland
- Archibald Meston, Australian politician and explorer
- Harold Parker, sculptor
- Sydney Ross (footballer), The first goalkeeper signed by Liverpool F.C. in their inaugural season
- Harry Turley, politician and President of the Australian Senate
- Janet Walker, costumier and dress making bust inventor
- Bill Noble Pioneer Australian rugby league player who played for Newtown Jets and Balmain Tigers
- Herb Brackenreg Pioneer Australian rugby league player who played for Sydney Roosters in 1908
