= Janet Walker (costumier) =

Australian costumier and businesswoman (1850–1940)

Janet Walker (1850–1940) (known as Jessie) was a costumier and businesswoman in Queensland, Australia. She operated the largest private dressmaking establishment in colonial Brisbane.

== Early life ==
Janet was born at Neilston, Renfrewshire, Scotland on 10 June 1850, the daughter of Andrew and Jane (née Gemmell) Robertson. In 1863 the family migrated to Queensland, Australia.

Janet Walker began her working life as a teacher at Brisbane Girls Normal School in 1872. In 1875 ‘Jessie’ was transferred to the New West End State School to the head girls’ department. During her time in this department the district inspector for the Board of Education, Gerard Anderson, described her as "a lively, energetic and intelligent person, with very good ideas of school-keeping… The pupil teachers are far behind her in animation." She then later resigned from this job on 31 December 1876. From the period of 1876 to 1882 she enjoyed her married life and motherhood before returning to work.

== Dressmaking career ==
After marrying James Laughland Walker, a Scottish-born draper, she operated a dressmaking business at several locations in Brisbane with her first premises located in Queen Street, Brisbane in 1882. Walker later established the "Ladies Emporium" in Adelaide Street, Brisbane in partnership with Brisbane milliner, Martha Caldwell. Walker's designs were known for attention to detail, use of luxurious fabrics and high quality finishing touches and were worn by prominent Queensland women to numerous receptions, weddings, balls and other events.

Two years from the start of the business, a female journalist from the Queenslander visited her store and wrote a review which made her business better known to the public. As well as the female journalist, her colleagues also joined her to review the rooms, their names were Miss Caldwell and Miss Margaret Scott. In 1886 Janet then decided to expand on the shop and move to a larger premise on Adelaide Street. From 1887 to 1901 the local press acknowledged Janet's designs of eighty-four wedding dresses, fourteen ball gowns and six receptions, and described thirty sets of trousseau garments made in her studio. It was said that her clients were included as one of the most well-known ladies in society of the time. If you were seen wearing a gown by Walker, then this reflected her skills as a designer and her high standard of workmanship. After a while of having a larger premises Janet then decided to downsize her studio back down in 1918 where she moved back to Queen Street. She ran and operated the largest private dressmaking establishment in colonial Brisbane. During the year of 1898 she employed over 120 staff members with most of them working in her studio. Throughout this time, she didn't pay any of her apprentices during their first year, but also didn't expect any of them to work overtime during this period. The rest of her employees however were paid but only minimum wage with the included overtime and bonus pay during busy periods. To ensure the success of her business, she made sure that her staff were very well trained, and this then resulted in several of her staff carrying on to create and set up their own businesses.

Martha Caldwell became Walker's partner, where they were then able to match competitive services offered by larger drapery stores. This was done by opening a ‘Ladies’ Emporium’ in September 1896. The business grew and became so successful that the partners were able to remodel the emporium three times before 1900. In 1897 a showroom was created on the ground level of the courier building in both Queen Street and Edward Street. The partners, Walker and Caldwell, decided that they would offer two services to the ladies of society. These were made to measure garments and ready-made garments. In order to make sure that the products were individual to the company, most of the fabrics were imported in full dress lengths with minimal amounts of lace and trimmings to embellish the garments but just enough to complete the product fully. The business became highly successful with a growing rate of large mail orders from clientele that was established in rural Queensland and New South Wales.

As the business grew the company got bigger and bigger with notable recognition from royalty which gave the partners the chance to make several gowns that would be worn to the opening of the Common Wealth Parliament in Melbourne 1901 and the reception at government house, Brisbane, for the Duke and Duchess of Cornwall and York. These garments were so special that they were then made into a feature in her new workrooms.

In addition to being a respected and well-known designer and dressmaker, Walker was also an innovative business woman. In 1895 Walker applied for a patent for a folding apparatus, designed to assist with folding woven fabrics, and in 1904 invented an improved dress stand for use in dressmaking. This design was known as the 'plastic bust' and was described as a "unique invention" which reproduced the "customer's exact figure, saves fitting, insures perfect work." This improved her dressmaking skills as Walker was able to make sure that her measurements were fully correct for her client throughout the dressmaking stages. The design of the new and improved dressmakers stand was then sold to the House of Worth, also Madame Paquin in Paris and then to the House of Redfern in London. 1905 was the year the Walker successfully floated the Plastic Bust Co. whilst she was in London. Janet Walker kept the business going and ran it up until 1938 where she retired being a talented and highly skilled costumier.

== Later life ==
She died on 27 November 1940 at Toowong and is buried with her family in South Brisbane Cemetery Only one of her children outlived her. To this day some of her gowns are held in the Queensland museum in Brisbane.
