= Dutton Park =

- Suburb
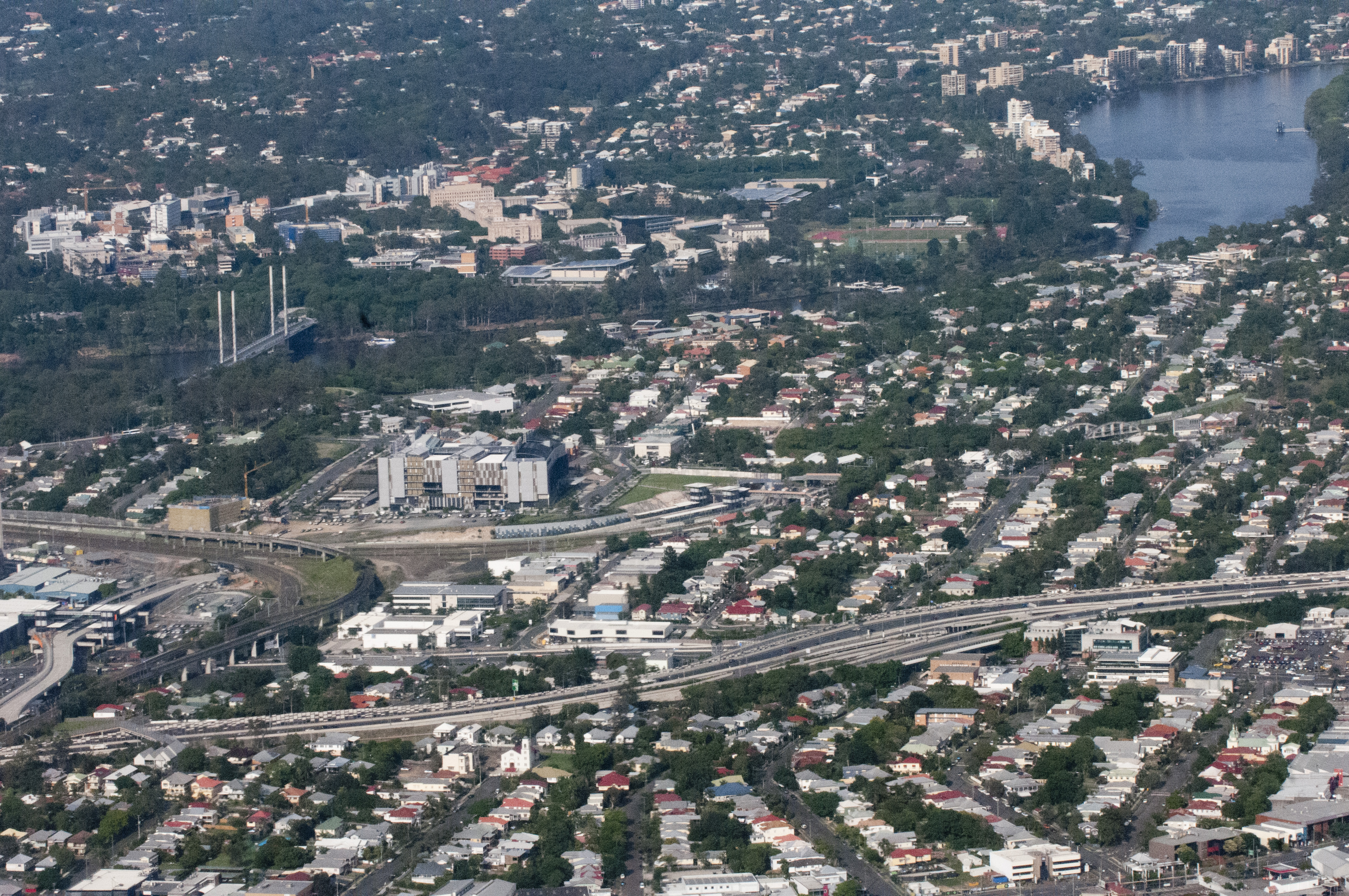
- Aerial view of Dutton Park

- Interactive map of Dutton Park
- Coordinates: 27.4941°S 153.0258°E
- Country: Australia
- State: Queensland
- City: Brisbane
- LGA: City of Brisbane (The Gabba Ward)
- Location: 4.8 km (3.0 mi) S of Brisbane CBD

Government
  - State electorate: South Brisbane
  - Federal division: Griffith

Area
  - Total: 1.1 km^{2} (0.42 sq mi)
- Elevation: 43 m (141 ft)

Population
  - Total: 2,134 (2021 census)
  - Density: 1,940/km^{2} (5,020/sq mi)
- Time zone: UTC+10:00 (AEST)
- Postcode: 4102
Suburbs around Dutton Park
Highgate Hill	South Brisbane	Woolloongabba
St Lucia	Dutton Park	Woolloongabba
St Lucia	Fairfield	Annerley

Dutton Park is an inner southern suburb in the City of Brisbane, Queensland, Australia. In the 2021 census, Dutton Park had a population of 2,134 people.

== Geography ==
Dutton Park is located about 4.3 kilometres (2.7 mi) south of the Brisbane CBD. It is bounded to the north-east by the Beenleigh railway line and the median of Brisbane River to the south-west. Dutton Park lies on a ridge to the east of the Brisbane River, opposite from St Lucia. The site slopes down from Gladstone Road.

Annerley Road enters the suburb from the north (South Brisbane) and exits to the south (Annerley). Gladstone Road enters the suburb from the north-west and has its junction with Annerley Road within the suburb. The Boggo Road railway station (formerly Park Road railway station) and the Dutton Park railway station are in the suburb on the Beenleigh line. The Cleveland railway line and the Fisherman Islands railway line have their junction with the Beenleigh line in the suburb.

The Eleanor Schonnell Bridge is a bridge across the Brisbane River connecting Dutton Park to the University of Queensland's St Lucia campus. It carries a busway, cyclists and pedestrians but not private automobiles.

Along the Brisbane River in the suburb, there is a large park (also called Dutton Park) alongside the South Brisbane Cemetery.

Along Annerley Road is the former Boggo Road Gaol, part of which remains as a heritage site. The remainder of the jail site was redeveloped as the Ecosciences Precinct, part of the Boggo Road Urban Village development. The precinct is a research facility for the Queensland Government, CSIRO and the University of Queensland through the Queensland Alliance for Agriculture and Food Innovation (QAAFI).

Apart from these major facilities, the suburb is predominantly residential, with some light industrial and commercial areas.

== History ==
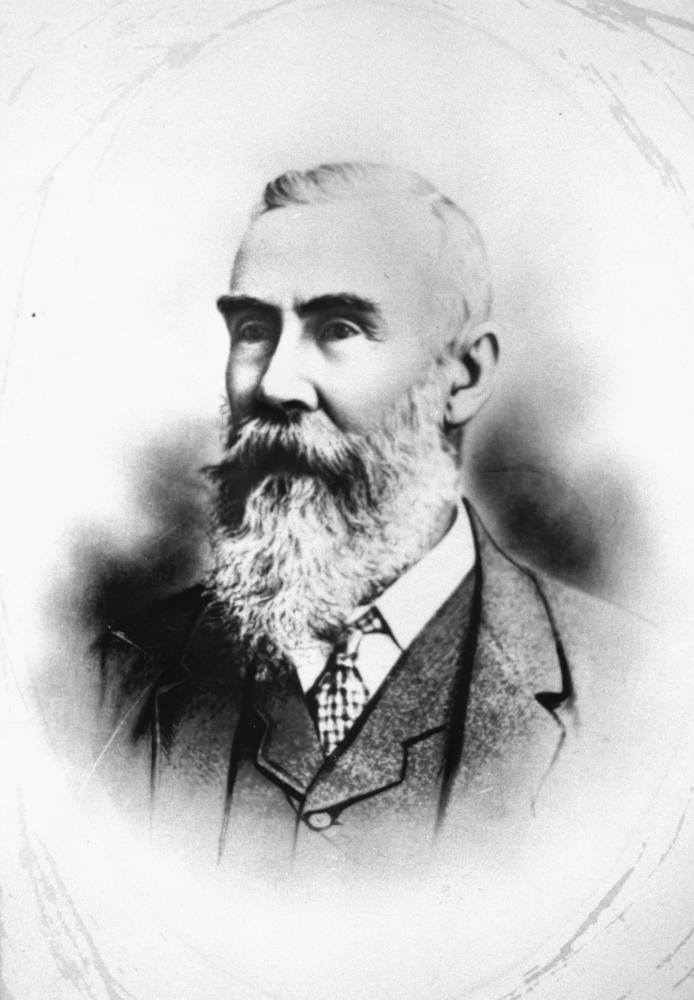
Charles Boydell Dutton, 1883

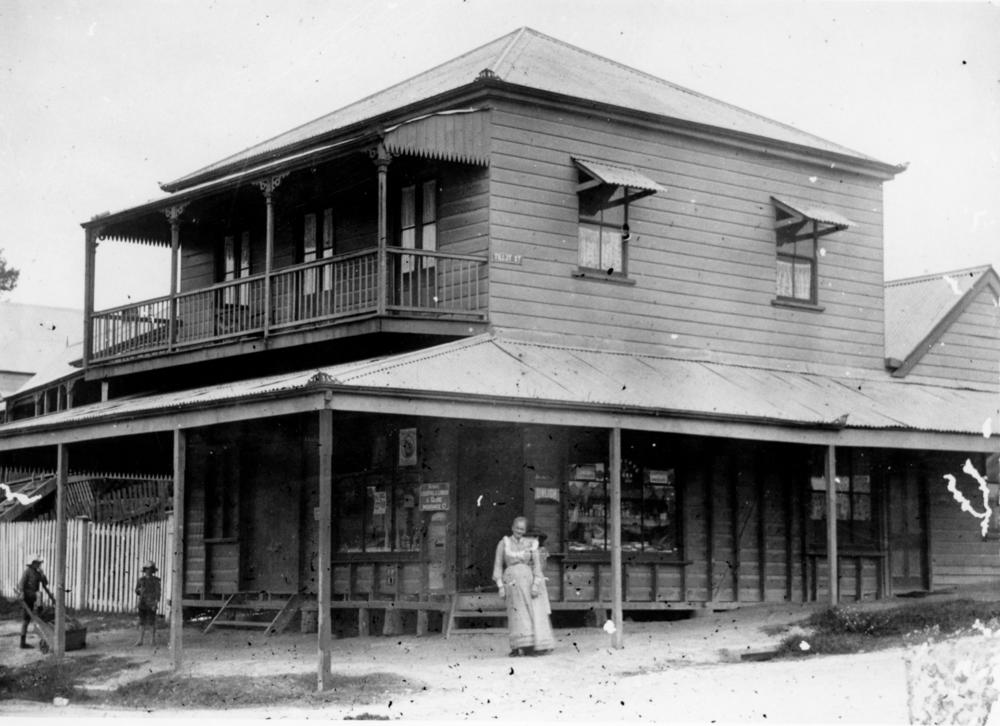
Shop of Janet Martin (née Gray) – Grandmother Martin – on the corner of Annerley Road and Tillot Street (ca. 1900)

Development in the suburb was slow because of difficult terrain, and the fact that a large part of the area was surveyed for government reserves by H.C. Rawnsley in 1863.

The South Brisbane cemetery was reserved in 1866 and is Brisbane's oldest surviving municipal cemetery.

In 1884, a park was named after Charles Boydell Dutton, the Queensland Minister for Lands from 1883 to 1887 (and great-great-grandfather of former Australian federal opposition leader, Peter Dutton). This became known as "Dutton's Park", a name which was later applied to surrounding estates, a school (originally known as the "Jail School") and a railway station before becoming the name of the suburb around 1910.

On 2 July 1883, the Boggo Road Gaol opened, firstly serving as a holding place for prisoners who were to be transported to St Helena Island but by 1989 housed over 300 prisoners. In 1903, a separate structure was opened adjacent to the main prison to house the female prisoners. After a Queensland Government inquiry into the living conditions of the inmates the female section of the prison was closed in 1989 with the male section closing in 1992 and later being demolished in 1996.

In 1884, the South Coast railway line was built, which included a station at Dutton Park.

Woolloongabba Mixed State School opened on 1 September 1884. It was split into Woolloongabba Girls and Infants State School and Woolloongabba Boys State School on 5 July 1885. In 1910, the schools were renamed to Dutton Park Girls and Infants State School and Dutton Park Boys State School. In 1935, the two schools were merged to form Dutton Park State School.

Between 1901 and 1969 the suburb was served by electric trams. Tram services operated along Gladstone Road and Annerley Road, with a connecting line to the Ipswich Road tram depot along Cornwall Street. J.S. Badger, owner of the Brisbane Tramway Company, developed the Dutton Park recreation reserve in order to increase patronage on the trams. For several years from 1908, open-air movie and variety shows known as 'Continentals' were held at the park, and proved enormously popular, drawing up to 5,000 people a night.

Between 1912 and 1927, a tram depot was located in Lang Street (now Tamar Street).

St Ita's Regional Primary School opened on 27 January 1919.

St Ita's Secondary School opened in 1932. In 1957, it was renamed St Ursula's College. It closed in 1957.

Dutton Park Opportunity School opened on 28 January 1936. In 1979 it was renamed Dutton Park Special School. On 16 December 1994, it ceased to operate as a separate school and became the special education unit of Dutton Park State School.

On 17 December 2006, the Eleanor Schonell Bridge was opened, linking the St Lucia campus of the University of Queensland with southern Brisbane.

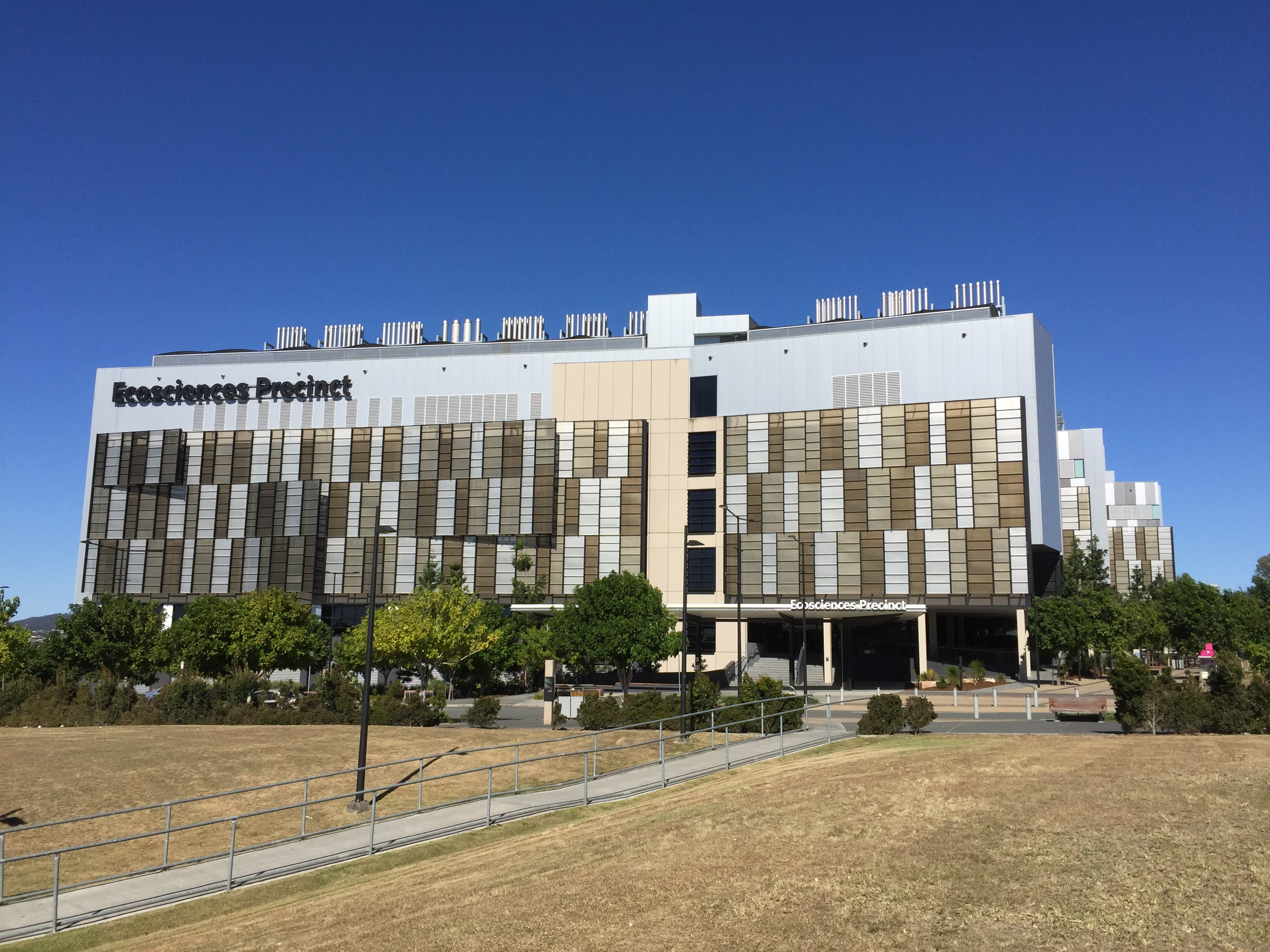
Ecosciences Precinct, 2016

The Ecosciences Precinct in the Boggo Road Urban Village development opened in 2011.

Brisbane South State Secondary College opened on 1 January 2021 for an initial intake of Year 7 students. During planning, it was known as Inner City South State Secondary College. It was built in Dutton Park to ease pressure on Brisbane State High School in neighbouring South Brisbane.

== Demographics ==
In the 2016 census, Dutton Park had a population of 2,024 people. The median age of the Dutton Park population was 32 years, six years below the Australian median. Children aged under 15 years made up 14.4% of the population and people aged 65 years and over made up 12.1% of the population. 58.4% of people were born in Australia. 62.2% of people spoke only English at home. Other languages spoken at home included Greek at 5.1%. The most common responses for religion were No Religion 40.4% and Catholic 17.9%.

In the 2021 census, Dutton Park had a population of 2,134 people.

== Heritage listings ==
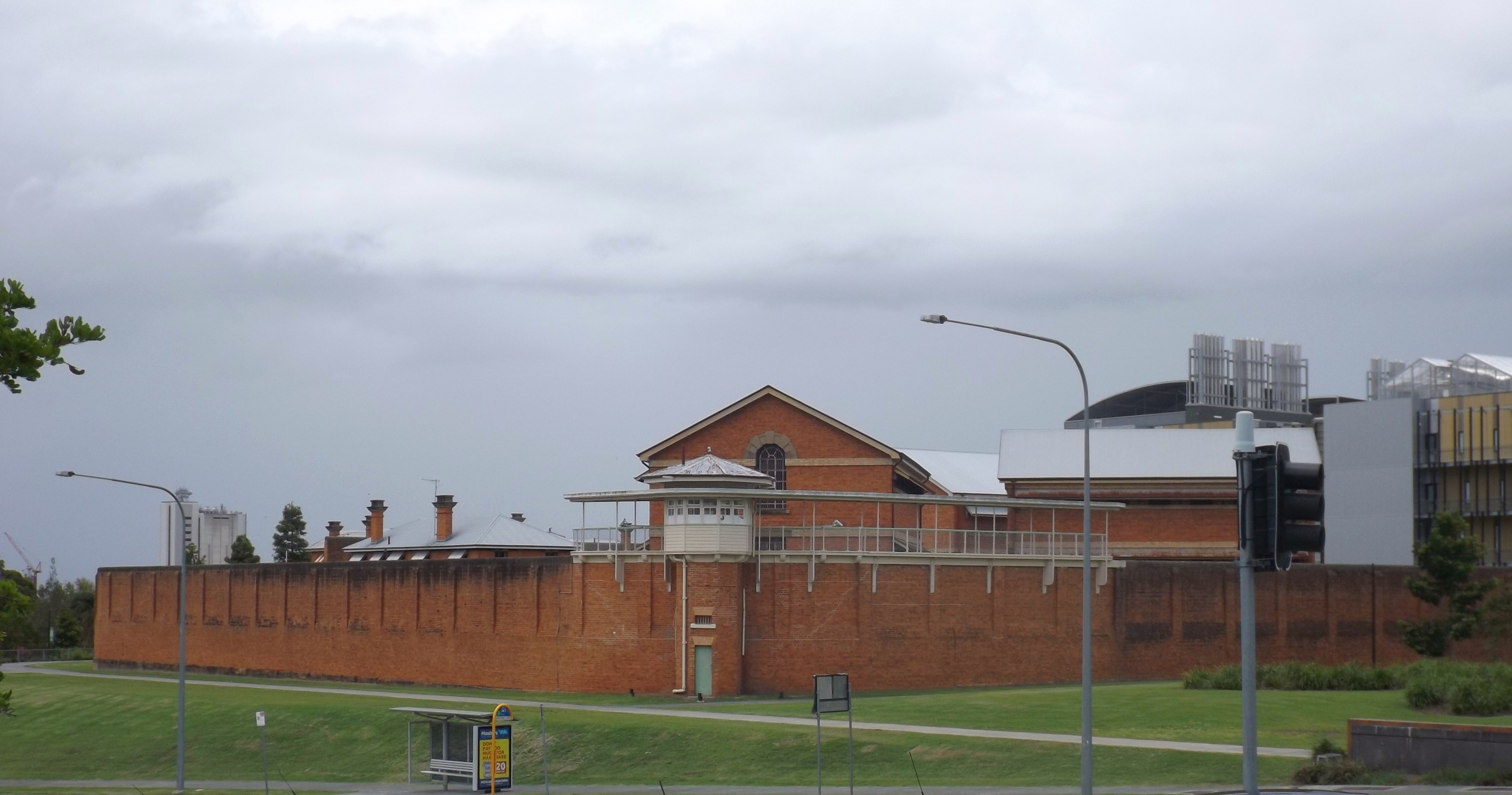
Boggo Road Gaol, 2015

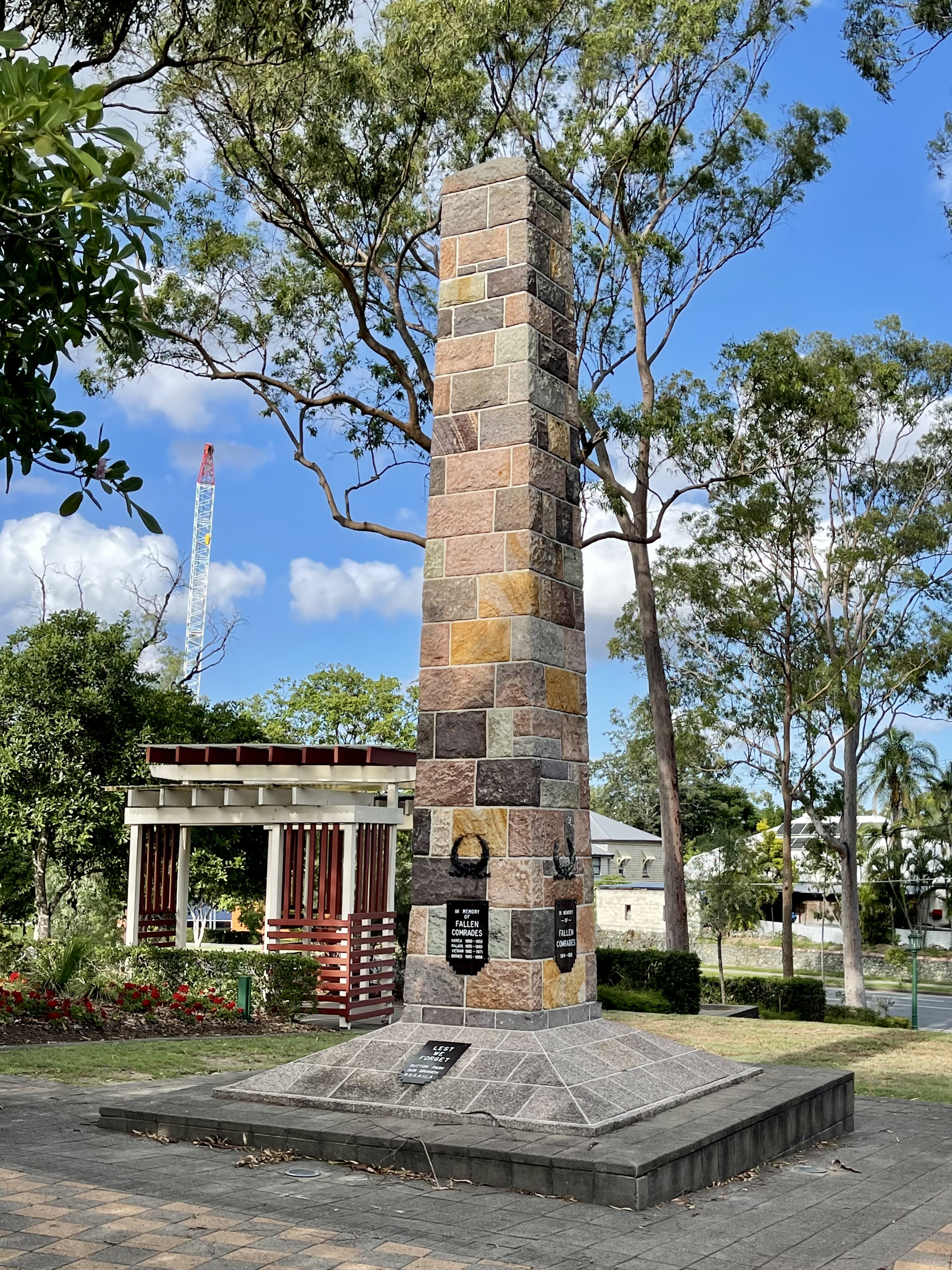
Dutton Park War Memorial, 2021

Dutton Park has a number of heritage-listed sites, including:

- Dutton Park State School, 112 Annerley Road (27.4934°S 153.0282°E)
- Boggo Road Gaol (No 2 Division and Remnant No 1 Division), 150 Annerley Road
- Gair Park, 181 Annerley Road
- South Brisbane Cemetery, 21 Fairfield Road
- Kurrowah, 218 Gladstone Road

== Attractions ==
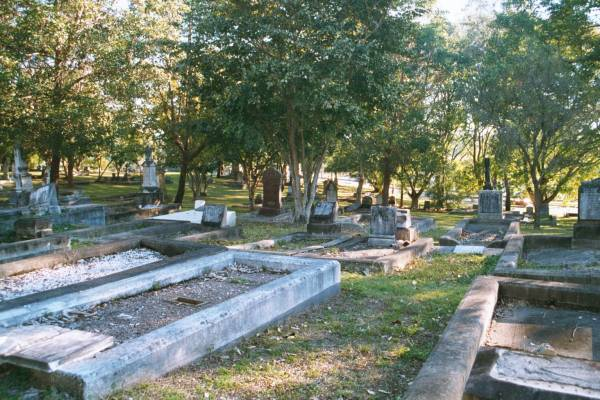
South Brisbane cemetery

The suburb is dominated by Dutton Park, which includes a large recreation area and public cemetery (colloquially known as Dutton Park Cemetery but officially known as South Brisbane Cemetery). T. J. Doyle Memorial Drive passes through the park and along past the river; it was named after Thomas Joseph Doyle, alderman for South Brisbane ward of the City of Brisbane from 1954 to 1964.

The former Boggo Road Gaol was located in the suburb and the remaining structure is now a historical museum.

== Education ==
Dutton Park State School is a government primary (Prep–6) school for boys and girls at 112 Annerley Road (27.4939°S 153.0279°E). In 2017, the school had an enrolment of 328 students with 28 teachers (21 full-time equivalent) and 11 non-teaching staff (9 full-time equivalent). It includes a special education program.

St Ita's Regional Primary School is a Catholic primary (Prep–6) school for boys and girls at 249 Gladstone Road (27.4947°S 153.0232°E). In 2017, the school had an enrolment of 363 students with 25 teachers (22 full-time equivalent) and 13 non-teaching staff (7 full-time equivalent).

Brisbane South State Secondary College is a government secondary (7–12) school for boys and girls at 179 Annerley Road (27.4959°S 153.0266°E). The 2021 initial intake was Year 7 students only, with each successive calendar year extending the range of school years on offer until 2026, when they eventually provided full schooling for Years 7–12.

== Transport ==
By bus, Transport for Brisbane bus routes 192, 196 and 198 serve the suburb along Gladstone Road. Annerley Road to the city (via the Busway) is served by routes 105, 107, 108, 109, 116 and 202. Since the opening of Dutton Park Place busway station on the Eleanor Schonell Bridge and the Boggo Road Busway, the suburb has become a major hub for the Brisbane City Busway.

By train, Dutton Park is served by the Dutton Park Railway Station which lies on the Beenleigh/Ferny Grove Line.
