= Eleanor Schonell Bridge =

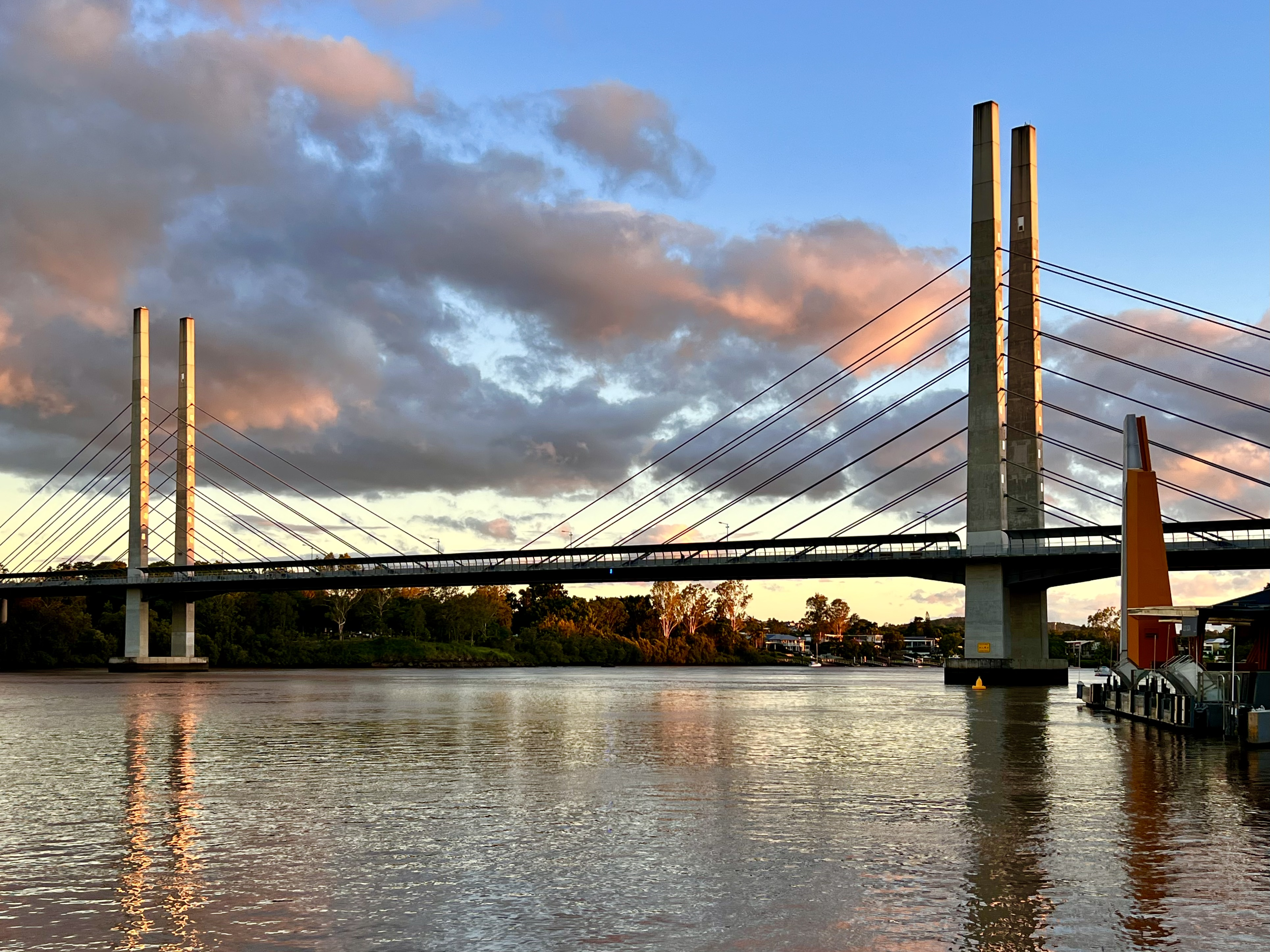
- Eleanor Schonell Bridge at sunset, January 2022
- Coordinates: 27.4978°S 153.0201°E
- Carries: Buses, pedestrians, bicycles.
- Crosses: Brisbane River
- Locale: Brisbane, Queensland, Australia
- Official name: Eleanor Schonell Bridge
- Named for: Eleanor Schonell

Characteristics
- Design: Cable-stayed bridge
- Total length: 390 metres (1,280 ft)

History
- Opened: 17 December 2006; 19 years ago

Location
- Interactive map of Eleanor Schonell Bridge

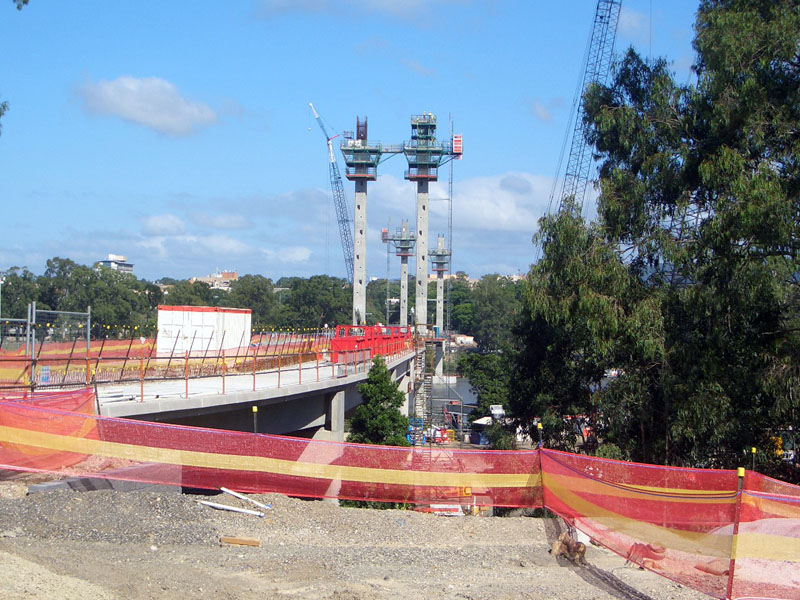
Eleanor Schonell Bridge (then called the "Green Bridge") during its construction

The Eleanor Schonell Bridge, better known as the Green Bridge, is a 390-metre (1,280 ft)-long cable-stayed bridge which crosses the Brisbane River between Dutton Park and the University of Queensland's St Lucia campus, connecting the UQ Lakes and Dutton Park Place busway stations. Its deck is 185 metres long, 20 metres wide and about 18 metres above the river's surface. The bridge was opened on 17 December 2006, and cost $55.5 million to construct.

The opening of the bridge signalled the end of the popular cross-river ferry service between Dutton Park and St Lucia, which had been running since 1967. The two ferries that remained at the cessation of the service, MV Loyalty and MV Vicky Lynn were sold, the Loyalty now being used as a private vessel and the Vicky Lynn as a floating advertisement for the Riverpoint Luxury Apartments in West End.

== Construction ==
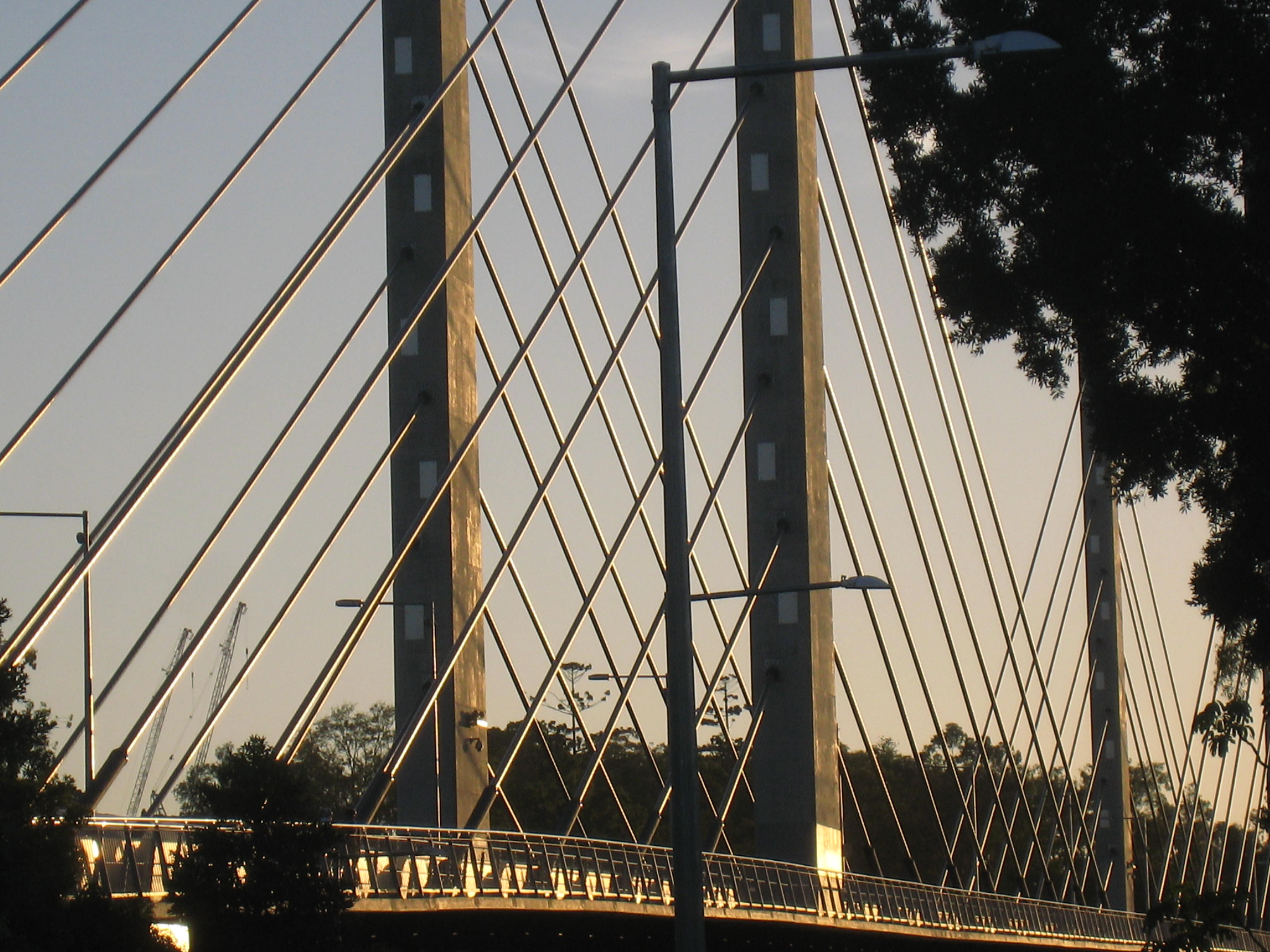

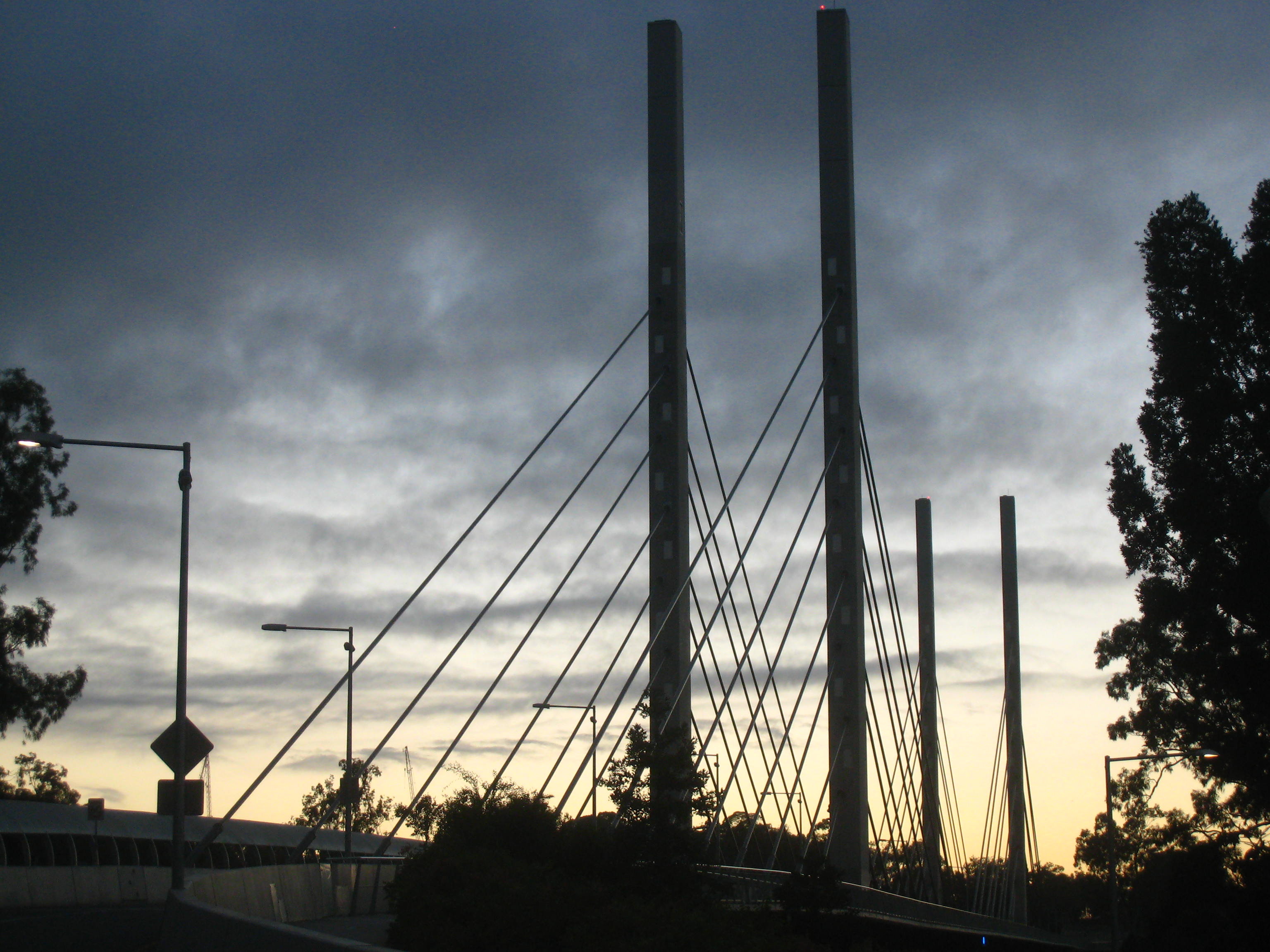

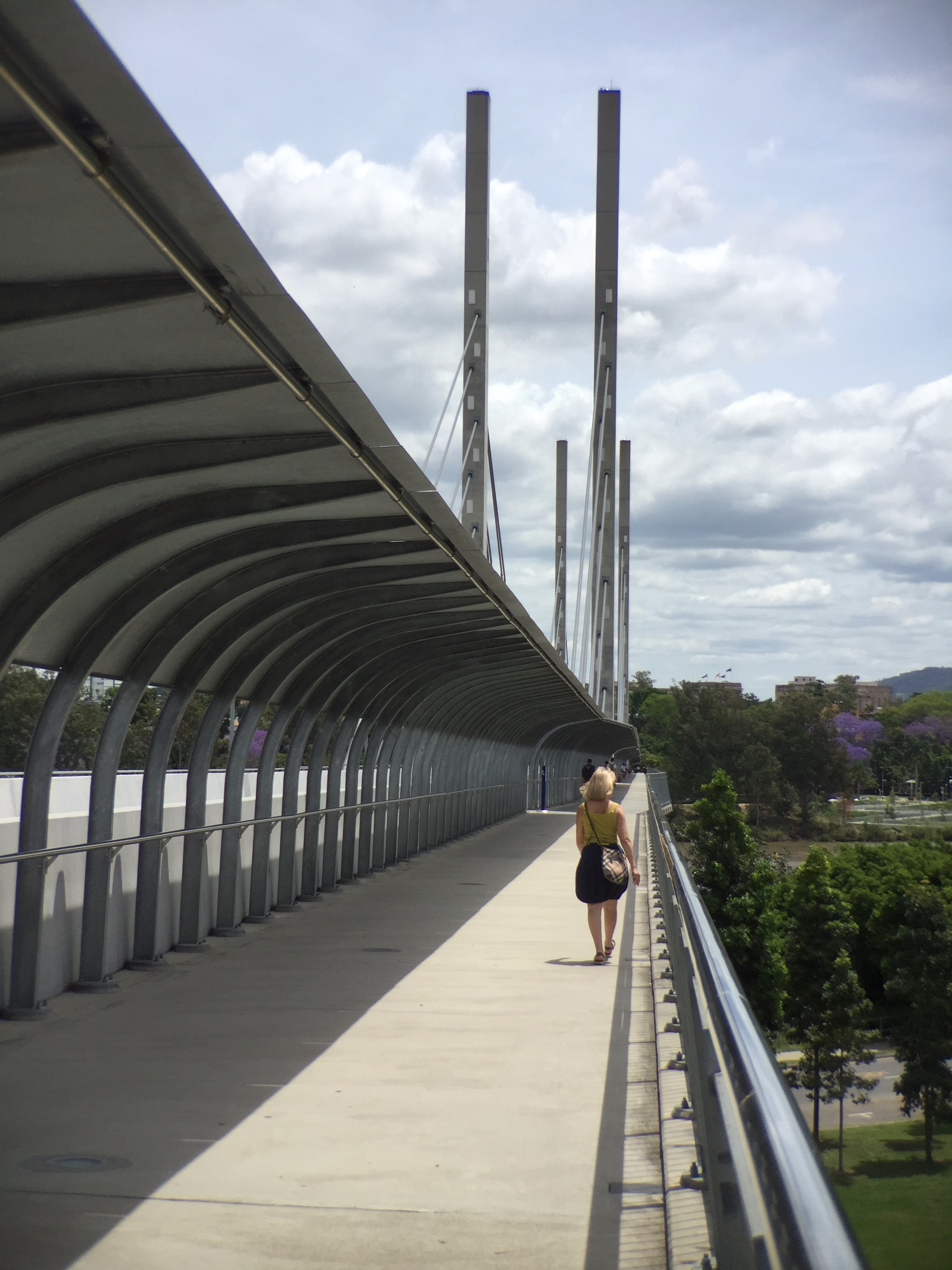

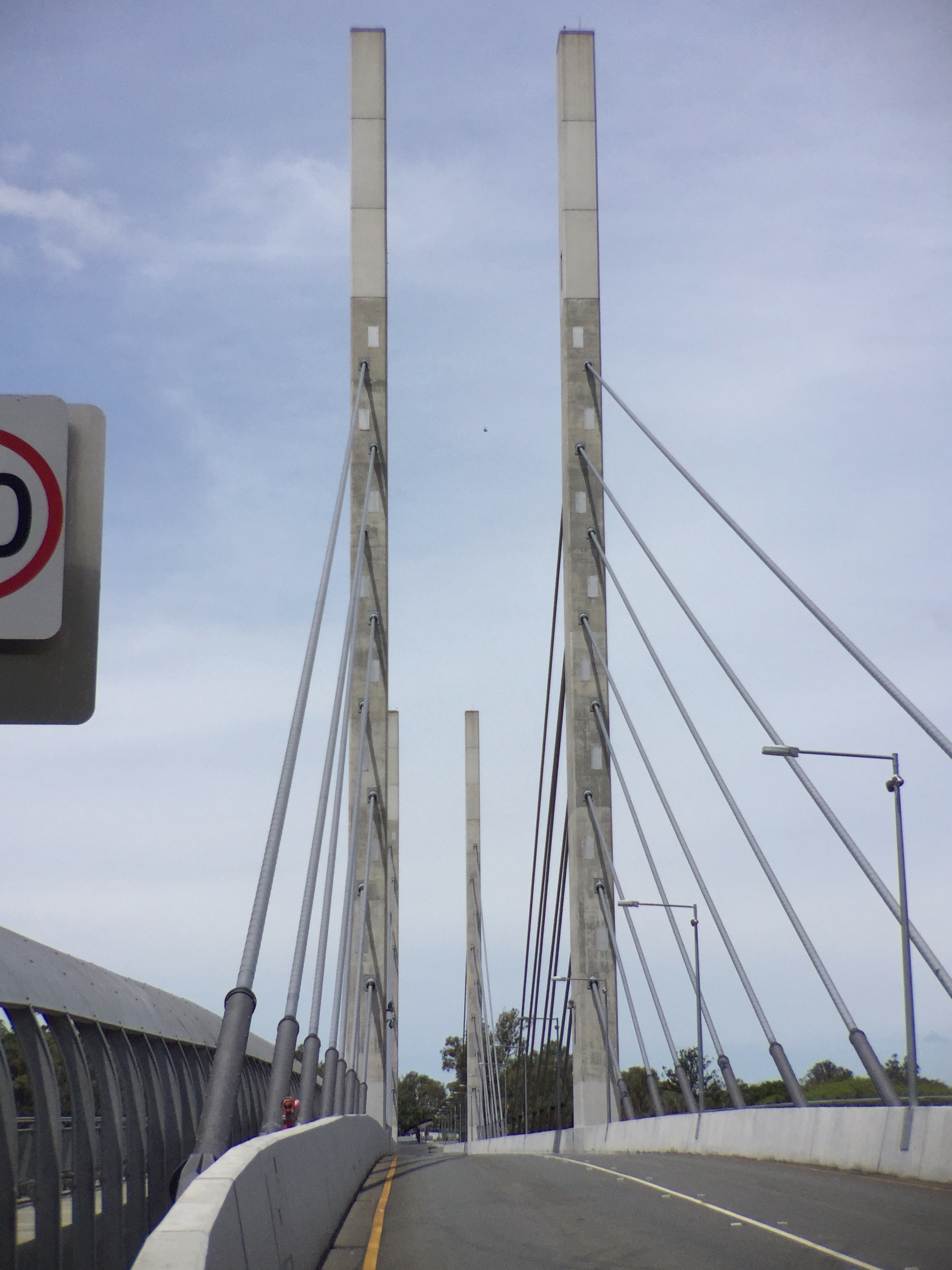

The "as-built" concept design of the bridge was proposed as an alternative design by Bruce Ramsay. Construction of the bridge has included a new road through Dutton Park, the expansion of Annerley Road, a new bus station for the University of Queensland and the permanent redirection of College Road in St Lucia. The detailed design and the construction was carried out by John Holland Group.

A related transport infrastructure project is the Eastern Busway which links the Eleanor Schonell Bridge with the Queensland Rail City network at Boggo Road station and to the South East Busway.

=== Green power ===
To conserve energy consumption energy efficient and low wattage lights were used. Feature lighting was also minimised to reduce both power requirements and the impact of the bridge on the surrounding area. Cut-off timers and remote operation features were also incorporated to reduce the amount of unnecessary lighting while still maintaining a safe environment for users. The energy requirement of the bridge is generated by a high-profile solar roof, containing 108 x 175W panels. The solar roof feeds electricity back into the supply authority grid thereby offsetting the mains power electricity used by the bridge at night.

=== Decoration ===
The bridge has some of the poetry of Brisbane-born poets Samuel Wagan Watson and Luke Beesley adorning it. The words are embedded into the footpath as well as embossed on the railing.

== Naming ==
An independent panel, which included Brisbane historian and author Helen Gregory, University of Queensland academic Michael Keniger, architect Bill Corker of Denton Corker Marshall, and representative from the Lord Mayor's Youth Advisory Council Milindee Jeewandara, produced a shortlist of three names to Brisbane's Civic Cabinet from hundreds suggested by the public being: Eleanor Schonell Bridge, Hawken Bridge and University Bridge.

Brisbane Lord Mayor Campbell Newman announced on 28 August 2006 that the Green Bridge would officially be called the Eleanor Schonell Bridge in honour of Florence Eleanor Schonell:

Eleanor Schonell made an internationally recognised contribution to testing for dyslexia and was renowned for her generous and humane approach to life. Her work with cerebral palsy children led to international recognition and she also contributed substantially to the education of children with intellectual disabilities.

During its conception and construction, the bridge was known as the "Green Bridge" because it was a sustainable transport initiative, and many people have continued to call it the Green Bridge in preference to its official name.

== Traffic impact ==
Although southside travellers previously had the option of boarding a cross-river ferry, the bridge has a far greater capacity. Average river crossing times improved, especially in the off-peak when only one ferry was in use. The popularity of the bridge had initially proven troubling to Translink and the Brisbane City Council, with extra buses having to be put on to cater to the large number of commuters traveling to St. Lucia campus. The Boggo road busway is now complete, and has delivered improved efficiency for the rail/bus interface at Park Road Station and has opened up the St. Lucia area to more travellers.

The new route possibilities are not all one-sided; northside commuters now have a 15-minute cycle along Annerley Road and the Goodwill bridge to the CBD from the UQ side of the bridge.

The Councillor for the local council ward of Tennyson, Nicole Johnston, whose electorate incorporates the Dutton Park side of the Eleanor Schonell Bridge, advocated a trial for private vehicular traffic. The Brisbane City Council did not respond to that suggestion.

=== St. Lucia end ===
The traffic area at the St Lucia end of the bridge terminates as a cul-de-sac, without any non-pedestrian thoroughfare options into the streets around The University of Queensland or St Lucia. The separate path for cyclists on the bridge leads directly through to various paths away from the bridge, a deliberate measure to ensure that "there will be no through-running bus service connected to the campus or to the suburb of St Lucia".

== Public transport services ==
To coincide with the opening, Translink announced three new bus services which would use the bridge: route numbers 109, 169 and 209. The 109 started operation on 18 December 2006, and links UQ to the city via Annerley Road and the CBD end of the South East Busway. The 169 service began in February 2007 and links UQ with Eight Mile Plains and Garden City. The 209 service also began in February 2007, and links UQ with Carindale.

A fourth service, the 139, was introduced in July 2007 in order to address overcrowding issues on the 169 and on Mains Road services from the Griffith University busway station, and links UQ with Sunnybank and Sunnybank Hills. The 139 only operates on weekdays during university semesters.

A fifth service, the 192, was announced in October 2008, designed to connect the university to West End and Highgate Hill. The 192 is not a new service; rather it is an extension of an older route servicing the West End/Highgate Hill area. It only operates on weekdays.

The most recent addition to the UQ service is the 29 route, operating a shuttle every five minutes between the Woolloongabba Bus Station and UQ Lakes.

== Incidents ==
On 24 October 2009, 21-year-old University of Queensland student Whitney Heuvel urged his friends to use a camera phone to film him jumping off the bridge. Intoxicated, he misjudged the rails and fell awkwardly, resulting in his death.

== See also ==
- Public transport in Brisbane
- Dutton Park Ferry
- Brisbane Metro
