= James Mooney (Queensland politician) =

James Mooney (c. 1829–1873) was an alderman in the Brisbane Municipal Council in Queensland, Australia.

== Private life ==
James Mooney was the son of Patrick Mooney from County Tipperary, Ireland and his wife Margaret (née O'Brien).

James Mooney died on 31 August 1873 in Brisbane aged 44 years after a long and painful illness; he was living in Stanley Street, South Brisbane at that time.

James Mooney was buried on 1 Sept 1873 in the Brisbane General Cemetery at Paddington.

== Public life ==
James Mooney was elected as an alderman for the South Ward of the Brisbane Municipal Council in 1865 and again in 1872 and 1873.

He served on the Legislative Committee in those years.

He was one of the original trustees of the South Brisbane Cemetery.
