= Eleanor Elizabeth Bourne =

Australian medical doctor (1878–1957)

Eleanor Elizabeth Bourne MB ChM
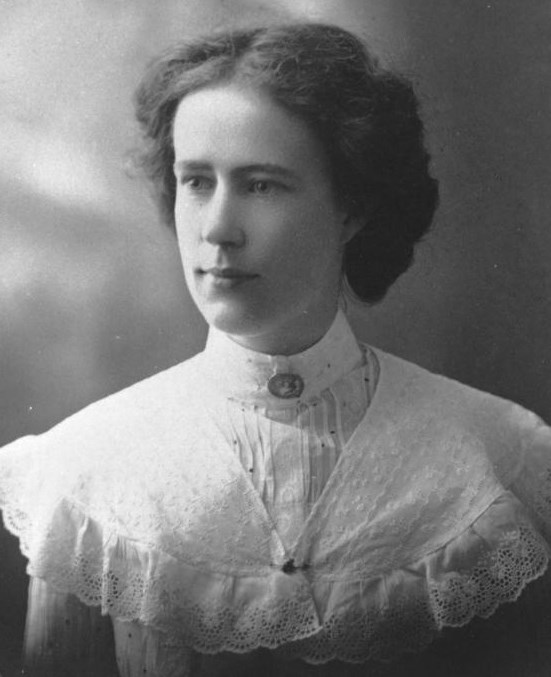
- Born: 4 December 1878; South Brisbane, Queensland
- Died: 23 May 1957 (aged 78); Nundah, Queensland
- Military career
- Allegiance: Allies of World War I
- Branch: Royal Army Medical Corps (RAMC); Queen Mary's Army Auxiliary Corps (QMAAC)
- Service years: 1916-1918
- Rank: Major
- Unit: (RAMC) Endell Street Military Hospital
- Commands: (QMAAC) Medical Controller, Northern Command (United Kingdom)
- Other work: Assistant medical officer to the city of Carlisle

Eleanor Elizabeth Bourne (4 December 1878 – 23 May 1957) was an Australian medical doctor. She was the first Queensland woman to study medicine. She also was one of only 15 women doctors in Australia who volunteered for service in World War I.

== Early life and education ==
Bourne was born at South Brisbane, Queensland, Australia on 4 December 1878, eldest child of John Sumner Pears Bourne, clerk in the Land Commission Court, and his wife Jane Elizabeth, née Hockings. Always an outstanding student, Eleanor Bourne had topped the state in the scholarship examination of 1891, and entered Brisbane Girls’ Grammar School in 1892. Keen to study medicine and unable to find the prerequisite subjects at Girls’ Grammar, she attended Brisbane Grammar School (Boys) in 1896 to complete her secondary education and facilitate tertiary scholarship application. Eleanor was awarded the Sydney University Exhibition in 1896, and this scholarship enabled her to become the first Queensland woman to study medicine. On 6 July 1903, Bourne graduated with a Bachelor of Medicine and a Master of Surgery, winning four honour passes, despite contracting a severe case of typhoid during her studies.

== Career ==
From 1903, Bourne was resident medical officer at the Women’s Hospital, Sydney, the first woman resident at Brisbane General Hospital, and she worked at the Hospital for Sick Children, Brisbane before entering general practice in 1907. Appointed the first Medical Inspector of Schools in the Department of Public Instruction in 1911, she travelled extensively through regional Queensland establishing principles and implementing practices for the medical examination of children.

Disagreements with the Department and a heavy workload fuelled Bourne’s desire for a change. Undeterred that the Australian Army did not admit female doctors, and determined to support the Allies, she embarked for England in early 1916 at her own expense, and enlisted in the Royal Army Medical Corps in London in May 1916. As a lieutenant she served in the Endell Street Military Hospital, London, founded by Dr Flora Murray and Dr Louisa Garrett Anderson, and staffed entirely by women. Promoted to major in 1917, Bourne was attached to Queen Mary’s Army Auxiliary Corps and appointed Medical Controller, Northern Command until the end of the War.

Bourne obtained a Diploma of Public Health in 1920, and continued her career in Britain, appointed assistant medical officer to the city of Carlisle, responsible for child and maternal welfare services and the new maternity hospital. She returned to Queensland upon retirement in 1937.

== Personal life and death ==
Bourne died on 23 May 1957 in Nundah Private Hospital and was buried in South Brisbane cemetery. She never married. Her sister, Florence Ida Bourne, was principal of the Maryborough Girls' High School and her brother, George Herbert, served with a distinguished record in World War I.

Bourne Street in the Canberra suburb of Cook is named in her honour.
