= Journal of Memory and Language =

- Discipline: Linguistics, psychology, artificial intelligence
- Language: English
- Edited by: Adrian Staub

Publication details
- Former name(s): Journal of Verbal Learning and Verbal Behavior
- History: 1985–present
- Publisher: Elsevier
- Frequency: 8/year
- Impact factor: 3.059 (2020)

Standard abbreviations
- ISO 4: J. Mem. Lang.

Indexing
- ISSN: 0749-596X (print); 1096-0821 (web)
- LCCN: 85644519
- OCLC no.: 11148687

Links
- Journal homepage

The Journal of Memory and Language is a peer-reviewed interdisciplinary academic journal of cognitive science, which focuses primarily on the issues of memory and language comprehension. It has been published by Elsevier since 1985. The current editor-in-chief is Adrian Staub (University of Massachusetts).

The Institute for Scientific Information's Journal Citation Reports ranked the journal first in the field of linguistics, with a 2010 impact factor of 4.014.

== Abstracting and indexing ==
The journal is indexed in Abstracts in Anthropology, Current Contents, Current Index to Journals in Education, Neuroscience Citation Index, PsycINFO, Research Alert, Scopus, and the Social Sciences Citation Index.
