= Electoral results for the district of Bulimba =

This is a list of electoral results for the electoral district of Bulimba in Queensland state elections.

== Members for Bulimba ==
Member	Party	Term
William Hemmant		1873–1876
James Johnston		1876
George Grimes		1876–1878
Frederick ffoulkes Swanwick		1878–1882
John Francis Buckland	Liberal	1882–1892
James Dickson	Independent	1892–1896
James Dickson	Ministerial	1896–1901
Walter Barnes	Ministerial	1901–1903
Walter Barnes	Conservative	1903–1909
Walter Barnes	Liberal	1909–1915
Hugh McMinn	Labor	1915–1918
Walter Barnes	National	1918–1922
Walter Barnes	United	1922–1923
Albert Wright	Labor	1923–1929
Irene Longman	Country and Progressive National	1929–1932
William Copley	Labor	1932–1938
George Marriott	Labor	1938–1941
George Marriott	Independent Labor	1941–1950
Bob Gardner	Labor	1950–1957
Bob Gardner	Queensland Labor	1957
Jack Houston	Labor	1957–1980
Ron McLean	Labor	1980–1992
Pat Purcell	Labor	1992–2009
Di Farmer	Labor	2009–2012
Aaron Dillaway	Liberal National	2012–2015
Di Farmer	Labor	2015–present

== Election results ==
=== Elections in the 2020s ===
2024 Queensland state election: Bulimba
Party	Candidate	Votes	%	±%
Labor	Di Farmer	15,560	42.11	−6.12
Liberal National	Laura Wong	13,469	36.45	+2.26
Greens	Linda Barry	6,095	16.50	+3.08
One Nation	Jonathon Andrade	1126	3.05	+0.79
Independent	Matthew Bellina	698	1.89	+1.89
Total formal votes		36,948	97.68	−0.42
Informal votes		876	2.32	+0.42
Turnout		37,824	90.21	+0.68
Two-party-preferred result
Labor	Di Farmer	21,486	58.15	−3.24
Liberal National	Laura Wong	15,462	41.85	+3.24
Labor hold		Swing	-3.24	

2020 Queensland state election: Bulimba
Party	Candidate	Votes	%	±%
Labor	Di Farmer	16,764	48.23	−0.64
Liberal National	Anthony Bishop	11,883	34.19	−0.35
Greens	Rolf Kuelsen	4,665	13.42	+0.30
One Nation	Doug Conway	785	2.26	+2.26
Independent	Finn Armstrong-Schmakeit	659	1.90	+1.90
Total formal votes		34,756	98.10	+1.53
Informal votes		673	1.90	−1.53
Turnout		35,429	89.53	+1.70
Two-party-preferred result
Labor	Di Farmer	21,336	61.39	+0.61
Liberal National	Anthony Bishop	13,420	38.61	−0.61
Labor hold		Swing	+0.61	

=== Elections in the 2010s ===
2017 Queensland state election: Bulimba
Party	Candidate	Votes	%	±%
Labor	Di Farmer	15,678	48.9	+1.1
Liberal National	Fiona Ward	11,080	34.5	−7.3
Greens	Felicity Jodell	4,211	13.1	+2.7
Independent	Bernadette Le Goullon	642	2.0	+2.0
Independent	Angus Jell	471	1.5	+1.5
Total formal votes		32,082	96.6	−2.0
Informal votes		1,140	3.4	+2.0
Turnout		33,222	87.8	+1.8
Two-party-preferred result
Labor	Di Farmer	19,499	60.8	+4.7
Liberal National	Fiona Ward	12,583	39.2	−4.7
Labor hold		Swing	+4.7	

2015 Queensland state election: Bulimba
Party	Candidate	Votes	%	±%
Labor	Di Farmer	14,539	47.72	+4.81
Liberal National	Aaron Dillaway	12,755	41.87	−4.83
Greens	David Hale	3,173	10.41	+0.02
Total formal votes		30,467	98.54	+0.27
Informal votes		450	1.46	−0.27
Turnout		30,917	90.18	−0.93
Two-party-preferred result
Labor	Di Farmer	16,741	56.14	+6.28
Liberal National	Aaron Dillaway	13,077	43.86	−6.28
Labor gain from Liberal National		Swing	+6.28	

2012 Queensland state election: Bulimba
Party	Candidate	Votes	%	±%
Liberal National	Aaron Dillaway	13,244	46.70	+9.63
Labor	Di Farmer	12,169	42.91	−4.83
Greens	Justin Bennett	2,947	10.39	−1.25
Total formal votes		28,360	98.27	−0.17
Informal votes		499	1.73	+0.17
Turnout		28,859	91.11	+1.10
Two-party-preferred result
Liberal National	Aaron Dillaway	13,690	50.14	+7.91
Labor	Di Farmer	13,615	49.86	−7.91
Liberal National gain from Labor		Swing	+7.91	

=== Elections in the 2000s ===
2009 Queensland state election: Bulimba
Party	Candidate	Votes	%	±%
Labor	Di Farmer	13,131	47.7	−9.6
Liberal National	Paul Walker	10,197	37.1	+7.3
Greens	Angela Dean	3,202	11.6	+0.2
DS4SEQ	Angela Wright	976	3.5	+3.5
Total formal votes		27,506	98.2	
Informal votes		436	11.6	
Turnout		27,942	90.0	
Two-party-preferred result
Labor	Di Farmer	14,968	57.8	−8.3
Liberal National	Paul Walker	10,940	42.2	+8.3
Labor hold		Swing	−8.3	

2006 Queensland state election: Bulimba
Party	Candidate	Votes	%	±%
Labor	Pat Purcell	13,666	57.6	−3.2
Liberal	Angela Julian-Armitage	7,043	29.7	+1.6
Greens	Howard Nielsen	2,685	11.3	+0.1
Independent	David Boehm	344	1.4	+1.4
Total formal votes		23,738	98.1	+0.1
Informal votes		449	1.9	−0.1
Turnout		24,187	89.2	−1.0
Two-party-preferred result
Labor	Pat Purcell	14,896	66.2	−2.3
Liberal	Angela Julian-Armitage	7,593	33.8	+2.3
Labor hold		Swing	−2.3	

2004 Queensland state election: Bulimba
Party	Candidate	Votes	%	±%
Labor	Pat Purcell	14,031	60.8	−12.4
Liberal	Glenn Snowdon	6,484	28.1	+1.3
Greens	John Houghton	2,575	11.2	+11.2
Total formal votes		23,090	98.0	+1.5
Informal votes		461	2.0	−1.5
Turnout		23,551	90.2	−1.3
Two-party-preferred result
Labor	Pat Purcell	15,051	68.5	−4.7
Liberal	Glenn Snowdon	6,937	31.5	+4.7
Labor hold		Swing	−4.7	

2001 Queensland state election: Bulimba
Party	Candidate	Votes	%	±%
Labor	Pat Purcell	16,295	73.2	+16.3
Liberal	Brent Woollett	5,960	26.8	+5.2
Total formal votes		22,255	96.5	
Informal votes		814	3.5	
Turnout		23,069	91.5	
Labor hold		Swing	+4.2	

=== Elections in the 1990s ===
1998 Queensland state election: Bulimba
Party	Candidate	Votes	%	±%
Labor	Pat Purcell	11,787	56.8	+0.9
Liberal	Marjorie Threapleton	4,393	21.2	−11.5
One Nation	Nigel Gibson	3,066	14.8	+14.8
Greens	Greg George	942	4.5	−7.0
Democrats	Mark Ault	494	2.4	+2.4
Reform	Wayne Jenkins	84	0.4	+0.4
Total formal votes		20,766	98.5	+0.4
Informal votes		316	1.5	−0.4
Turnout		21,082	92.6	+1.3
Two-party-preferred result
Labor	Pat Purcell	13,514	69.5	+6.9
Liberal	Marjorie Threapleton	5,929	30.5	−6.9
Labor hold		Swing	+6.9	

1995 Queensland state election: Bulimba
Party	Candidate	Votes	%	±%
Labor	Pat Purcell	11,095	55.8	−6.4
Liberal	Toni Drewett	6,491	32.7	+8.0
Greens	Barry Wilson	2,287	11.5	−1.6
Total formal votes		19,873	98.1	+0.7
Informal votes		395	1.9	−0.7
Turnout		20,268	91.3	
Two-party-preferred result
Labor	Pat Purcell	12,171	62.6	−7.9
Liberal	Toni Drewett	7,276	37.4	+7.9
Labor hold		Swing	−7.9	

1992 Queensland state election: Bulimba
Party	Candidate	Votes	%	±%
Labor	Pat Purcell	12,558	62.2	−6.2
Liberal	Alvan Hawkes	4,988	24.7	+4.6
Greens	Barry Wilson	2,646	13.1	+13.1
Total formal votes		20,192	97.3	
Informal votes		549	2.7	
Turnout		20,741	90.5	
Two-party-preferred result
Labor	Pat Purcell	13,673	70.4	+1.2
Liberal	Alvan Hawkes	5,737	29.6	−1.2
Labor hold		Swing	+1.2	

=== Elections in the 1980s ===
1989 Queensland state election: Bulimba
Party	Candidate	Votes	%	±%
Labor	Ron McLean	12,766	68.2	+10.0
Liberal	Alvan Hawkes	3,792	20.3	+3.0
National	Judith Brown	2,156	11.5	−13.0
Total formal votes		18,714	97.1	−1.0
Informal votes		567	2.9	+1.0
Turnout		19,281	90.9	−0.1
Two-party-preferred result
Labor	Ron McLean	12,913	69.0	+6.0
Liberal	Alvan Hawkes	5,801	31.0	+31.0
Labor hold		Swing	+6.0	

1986 Queensland state election: Bulimba
Party	Candidate	Votes	%	±%
Labor	Ron McLean	10,486	58.2	+1.5
National	Judith Brown	4,413	24.5	−4.4
Liberal	Alan Bavister	3,125	17.3	+3.1
Total formal votes		18,024	98.1	
Informal votes		355	1.9	
Turnout		18,379	91.0	
Two-party-preferred result
Labor	Ron McLean	11,355	63.0	−3.0
National	Judith Brown	6,669	37.0	+3.0
Labor hold		Swing	−3.0	

1983 Queensland state election: Bulimba
Party	Candidate	Votes	%	±%
Labor	Ron McLean	8,073	56.9	+2.3
National	Peter Stone	4,106	28.9	+28.9
Liberal	Isabel Daniel	2,020	14.2	−31.2
Total formal votes		14,199	98.4	+0.6
Informal votes		234	1.6	−0.6
Turnout		14,433	91.8	+2.9
Two-party-preferred result
Labor	Ron McLean	8,524	60.0	+5.4
National	Peter Stone	5,675	40.0	+40.0
Labor hold		Swing	+5.4	

1980 Queensland state election: Bulimba
Party	Candidate	Votes	%	±%
Labor	Ron McLean	7,657	54.6	−5.2
Liberal	Brian Kirkham	6,380	45.4	+5.2
Total formal votes		14,037	97.8	−0.4
Informal votes		308	2.2	+0.4
Turnout		14,345	88.9	−3.1
Labor hold		Swing	−5.2	

=== Elections in the 1970s ===
1977 Queensland state election: Bulimba
Party	Candidate	Votes	%	±%
Labor	Jack Houston	8,771	59.8	+9.6
Liberal	John Leggoe	5,905	40.2	−9.6
Total formal votes		14,676	98.2	
Informal votes		265	1.8	
Turnout		14,941	92.0	
Labor hold		Swing	+9.6	

1974 Queensland state election: Bulimba
Party	Candidate	Votes	%	±%
Labor	Jack Houston	6,199	51.7	−12.3
Liberal	Megan Wilding	5,785	48.3	+21.7
Total formal votes		11,984	98.4	−0.2
Informal votes		199	1.6	+0.2
Turnout		12,183	88.5	−5.6
Labor hold		Swing	−13.9	

1972 Queensland state election: Bulimba
Party	Candidate	Votes	%	±%
Labor	Jack Houston	7,446	64.0	
Liberal	Megan Wilding	3,098	26.6	
Queensland Labor	Paul Tucker	1,081	9.3	
Total formal votes		11,625	98.6	
Informal votes		165	1.4	
Turnout		11,790	94.1	
Two-party-preferred result
Labor	Jack Houston	7,629	65.6	+6.2
Liberal	Megan Wilding	3,996	34.4	−6.2
Labor hold		Swing	+6.2	

=== Elections in the 1960s ===
1969 Queensland state election: Bulimba
Party	Candidate	Votes	%	±%
Labor	Jack Houston	8,494	66.5	+2.7
Liberal	Megan Wilding	3,350	26.2	−4.4
Queensland Labor	Paul Tucker	937	7.3	+1.6
Total formal votes		12,781	98.1	−0.5
Informal votes		246	1.9	+0.5
Turnout		13,027	93.8	−1.0
Two-party-preferred result
Labor	Jack Houston	8,669	67.8	+3.0
Liberal	Megan Wilding	4,112	32.2	−3.0
Labor hold		Swing	+3.0	

1966 Queensland state election: Bulimba
Party	Candidate	Votes	%	±%
Labor	Jack Houston	7,788	63.8	+0.9
Liberal	Brian Perkins	3,738	30.6	−0.1
Queensland Labor	Paul Tucker	691	5.7	−0.7
Total formal votes		12,217	98.6	+0.4
Informal votes		173	1.4	−0.4
Turnout		12,390	94.8	−0.9
Two-party-preferred result
Labor	Jack Houston	7,917	64.8	+0.7
Liberal	Brian Perkins	4,300	35.2	−0.7
Labor hold		Swing	+0.7	

1963 Queensland state election: Bulimba
Party	Candidate	Votes	%	±%
Labor	Jack Houston	7,220	62.9	+6.2
Liberal	Stan Latham	3,520	30.7	+3.3
Queensland Labor	Paul Tucker	740	6.4	−9.5
Total formal votes		11,480	98.2	−0.3
Informal votes		211	1.8	+0.3
Turnout		11,691	95.7	+1.3
Two-party-preferred result
Labor	Jack Houston	7,358	64.1	
Liberal	Stan Latham	4,122	35.9	
Labor hold		Swing	N/A	

1960 Queensland state election: Bulimba
Party	Candidate	Votes	%	±%
Labor	Jack Houston	6,184	56.7	+18.4
Liberal	Ronald Kelk	2,985	27.4	−5.9
Queensland Labor	Robert Gardner	1,734	15.9	−12.4
Total formal votes		10,903	98.5	
Informal votes		163	1.5	
Turnout		11,066	94.4	
Labor hold		Swing	+13.9	

=== Elections in the 1950s ===
1957 Queensland state election: Bulimba
Party	Candidate	Votes	%	±%
Labor	Jack Houston	4,993	37.0	−19.7
Liberal	Bill Lickiss	4,619	34.2	−6.5
Queensland Labor	Robert Gardner	3,891	28.8	+28.8
Total formal votes		13,503	99.1	+0.6
Informal votes		124	0.9	−0.6
Turnout		13,627	95.9	−0.9
Labor hold		Swing	−6.2	

1956 Queensland state election: Bulimba
Party	Candidate	Votes	%	±%
Labor	Robert Gardner	7,437	56.7	−7.3
Liberal	John Mills	5,350	40.7	+4.7
Independent	Herbert Ricketts	341	2.6	+2.6
Total formal votes		13,128	98.5	0.0
Informal votes		201	1.5	0.0
Turnout		13,329	95.0	−0.7
Labor hold		Swing	−6.0	

1953 Queensland state election: Bulimba
Party	Candidate	Votes	%	±%
Labor	Robert Gardner	7,938	64.0	+28.3
Liberal	Ronald Holt	4,464	36.0	+0.7
Total formal votes		12,402	98.5	−0.3
Informal votes		193	1.5	+0.3
Turnout		12,595	95.7	+1.4
Labor hold		Swing	+13.7	

1950 Queensland state election: Bulimba
Party	Candidate	Votes	%	±%
Labor	Robert Gardner	4,024	35.7	
Liberal	John Hamilton	3,982	35.3	
Independent Labor	George Marriott	3,266	29.0	
Total formal votes		11,272	98.8	
Informal votes		138	1.2	
Turnout		11,410	94.3	
Labor gain from Independent Labor		Swing		

=== Elections in the 1940s ===
1947 Queensland state election: Bulimba
Party	Candidate	Votes	%	±%
Independent Labor	George Marriott	5,544	42.8	+1.0
People's Party	Hilda Brotherton	3,828	29.5	−4.1
Labor	Robert Gardner	3,588	27.7	+3.2
Total formal votes		12,960	98.1	+2.1
Informal votes		244	1.9	−2.1
Turnout		13,204	94.0	−0.8
Independent Labor hold		Swing	+3.8	

1944 Queensland state election: Bulimba
Party	Candidate	Votes	%	±%
Independent Labor	George Marriott	4,577	41.8	+41.8
People's Party	Geoffrey Ward	3,680	33.6	+3.7
Labor	Robert Gardner	2,683	24.5	−45.6
Total formal votes		10,940	96.0	−1.4
Informal votes		459	4.0	+1.4
Turnout		11,399	94.8	+1.1
Independent Labor gain from Labor		Swing	N/A	

1941 Queensland state election: Bulimba
Party	Candidate	Votes	%	±%
Labor	George Marriott	7,181	70.1	+10.3
United Australia	Daniel Miller	3,067	29.9	+8.1
Total formal votes		10,248	97.4	−0.2
Informal votes		275	2.6	+0.2
Turnout		10,523	93.7	−1.7
Labor hold		Swing	−3.2	

=== Elections in the 1930s ===
1938 Queensland state election: Bulimba
Party	Candidate	Votes	%	±%
Labor	George Marriott	5,847	59.8	−7.0
United Australia	Robert Larmar	2,132	21.8	−5.3
Social Credit	Julius Streeter	1,221	12.5	+12.5
Independent	Bernard Dent	577	5.9	+5.9
Total formal votes		9,777	97.6	−0.8
Informal votes		240	2.4	+0.8
Turnout		10,017	95.4	+0.4
Labor hold		Swing	N/A	

- Preferences were not distributed.

1935 Queensland state election: Bulimba
Party	Candidate	Votes	%	±%
Labor	William Copley	6,013	66.8	
CPNP	Clive Lambourne	2,445	27.1	
Communist	Donald Parker	546	6.1	
Total formal votes		9,004	98.4	
Informal votes		149	1.6	
Turnout		9,153	95.0	
Labor hold		Swing		

- Preferences were not distributed.

1932 Queensland state election: Bulimba
Party	Candidate	Votes	%	±%
Labor	William Copley	5,919	62.8	
CPNP	Irene Longman	3,320	35.2	
Communist	Bernie Besant	193	2.0	
Total formal votes		9,432	99.1	
Informal votes		89	0.9	
Turnout		9,521	94.5	
Labor gain from CPNP		Swing		

- Preferences were not distributed.

=== Elections in the 1920s ===
1929 Queensland state election: Bulimba
Party	Candidate	Votes	%	±%
CPNP	Irene Longman	5,762	51.8	+11.9
Labor	Albert Wright	5,361	48.2	−7.4
Total formal votes		11,123	98.8	0.0
Informal votes		134	1.2	0.0
Turnout		11,257	92.9	−0.8
CPNP gain from Labor		Swing	N/A	

1926 Queensland state election: Bulimba
Party	Candidate	Votes	%	±%
Labor	Albert Wright	5,101	55.6	+1.8
CPNP	Allan Stanton	3,663	39.9	−5.0
Independent Labor	John Costin	411	4.5	+4.5
Total formal votes		9,175	98.8	−0.5
Informal votes		114	1.2	+0.5
Turnout		9,289	93.7	+9.5
Labor hold		Swing	N/A	

1923 Queensland state election: Bulimba
Party	Candidate	Votes	%	±%
Labor	Albert Wright	3,956	53.8	+9.5
United	Duncan Watson	3,298	44.9	−10.8
Independent	Thomas Andrews	94	1.3	+1.3
Total formal votes		7,348	99.3	+0.1
Informal votes		49	0.7	−0.1
Turnout		7,397	84.2	+7.2
Labor gain from United		Swing	N/A	

1920 Queensland state election: Bulimba
Party	Candidate	Votes	%	±%
National	Walter Barnes	6,345	55.7	+4.4
Labor	George Marriott	5,053	44.3	−3.2
Total formal votes		11,398	99.2	+0.1
Informal votes		86	0.8	
Turnout		11,484	77.0	−9.8
National hold		Swing	N/A	

=== Elections in the 1910s ===
1918 Queensland state election: Bulimba
Party	Candidate	Votes	%	±%
National	Walter Barnes	5,018	51.3	+2.9
Labor	Hugh McMinn	4,649	47.5	−4.1
Independent	Joseph Marconi	122	1.2	+1.2
Total formal votes		9,789	99.1	+0.6
Informal votes		84	0.9	−0.6
Turnout		9,873	86.8	−6.6
National gain from Labor		Swing	N/A	

1915 Queensland state election: Bulimba
Party	Candidate	Votes	%	±%
Labor	Hugh McMinn	3,774	51.6	+8.5
Liberal	Walter Barnes	3,536	48.4	−8.5
Total formal votes		7,310	98.5	−0.9
Informal votes		109	1.5	+0.9
Turnout		7,419	93.4	+7.7
Labor gain from Liberal		Swing	+8.5	

1912 Queensland state election: Bulimba
Party	Candidate	Votes	%	±%
Liberal	Walter Barnes	2,315	56.9	
Labor	Hugh McMinn	1,752	43.1	
Total formal votes		4,067	99.4	
Informal votes		23	0.6	
Turnout		4,090	85.7	
Liberal hold		Swing		
