= Toorak House, Brisbane =

Historic villa in Hamilton, Queensland

Toorak House
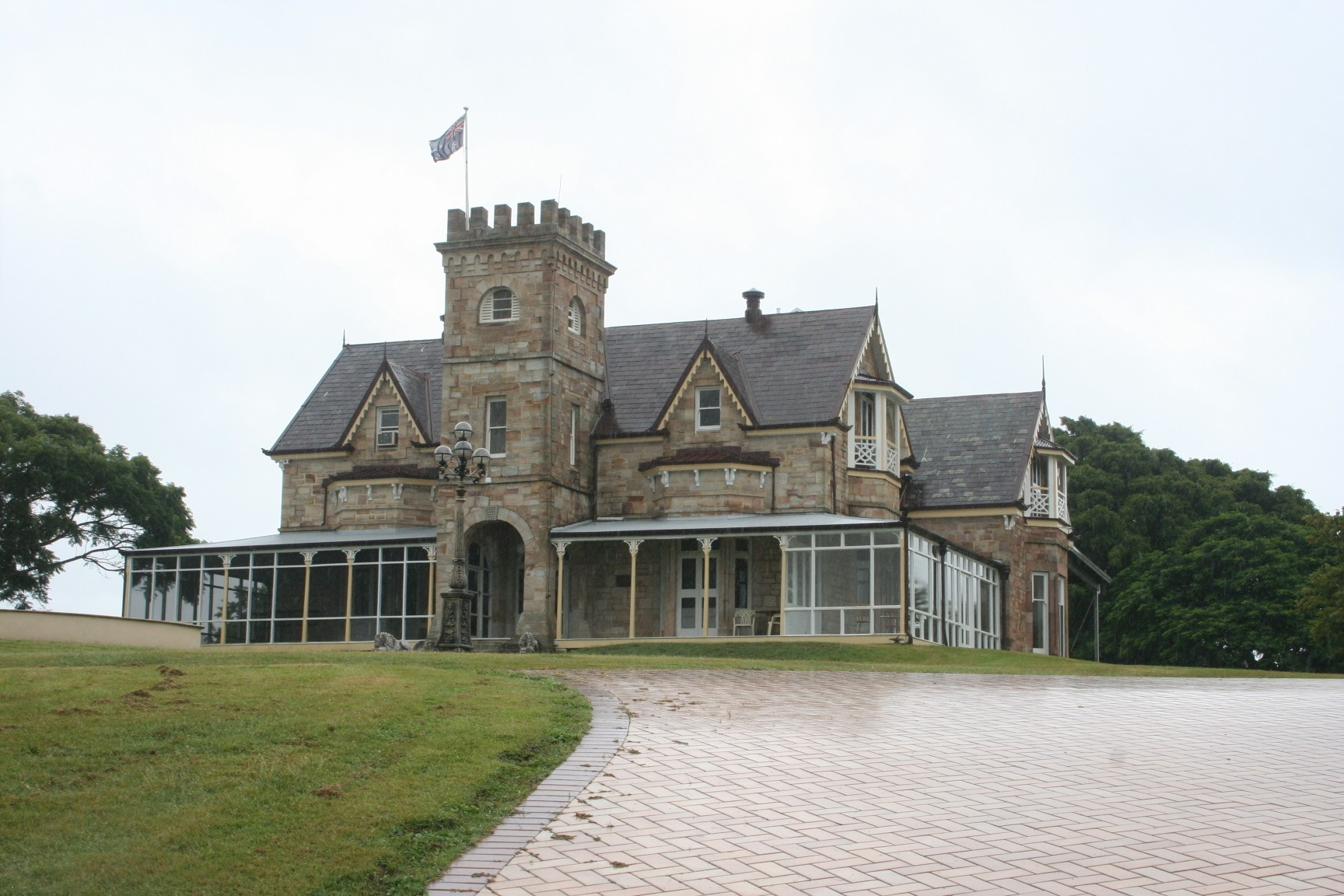
- Toorak House, 2009

- Location within Queensland Location within Australia
- 27.4373°S 153.0524°E
- Location: 28 Annie Street, Hamilton, City of Brisbane, Queensland, Australia

History
- Design period: 1840s–1860s (mid-19th century)
- Built: 1864–1915
- Built for: James Dickson

Site notes
- Architect: George Raymond Johnson (1849-1898)

Queensland Heritage Register
- Official name: Toorak House
- Type: state heritage (landscape, built)
- Designated: 2 March 1994
- Reference no.: 600216
- Significant period: 1860s–1890s, 1910s (fabric); 1860s–1910s (historical)
- Significant components: garden/grounds, views to, tower – observation/lookout, mural / fresco, wall/s – retaining, residential accommodation – main house, gate – entrance, views from, out house, garden edging/balustrades/planter boxes

Toorak House is a heritage-listed villa at 28 Annie Street, Hamilton, City of Brisbane, Queensland, Australia. It was built from 1864 to 1915. It was added to the Queensland Heritage Register on 2 March 1994.

== History ==
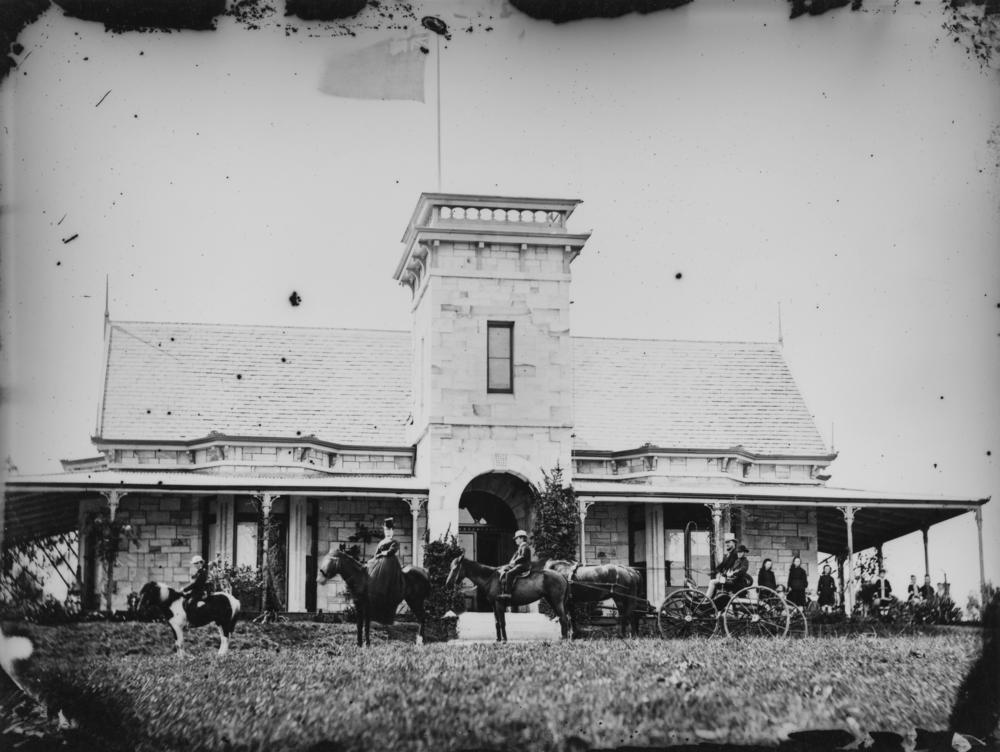
James Dickson and family outside Toorak House, circa 1872

This two storeyed stone residence was erected in 1864 at Breakfast Creek for Brisbane businessman James Dickson. Dickson appeared to be living at Breakfast Creek by March 1865, and references to the Dicksons at Toorak appear later that year.

Dickson arrived in Brisbane in 1862, and was in business with Arthur Martin as an auctioneer and land agent until August 1864 when the partnership was dissolved. Martin continued business under his own name, and Dickson formed a new partnership with James Duncan, as general auctioneers and land and commission agents. The firms of A Martin and Dickson and Duncan appear to have been responsible for much of the land subdivision and sales in Brisbane during the mid-late 1860s. Dickson entered the Queensland Legislative Assembly in 1873 as the Member for Enoggera, and held various offices until he resigned in 1887. After failing to regain a seat in the 1888 colonial election, Dickson did not re-enter politics until 1892 when he won the seat of Bulimba. Dickson became Queensland Premier in October 1898, holding this position until December 1899. A strong advocate of Federation, Dickson was a member of the Australian delegation to England for the passage of the Commonwealth bill through the Imperial parliament. Dickson was a member of the first Federal Parliament and appointed the first Commonwealth Minister of Defence. Dickson was involved also in various companies including the Royal Bank of Queensland, the Brisbane Permanent Building and Banking Society, Queensland Trustees and the Queensland Insurance and Land Mortgage Company. Knighted on the day of Federation, he died 10 days later.

William Robert Howe Weekes of Brisbane was granted almost 32 acres of land in 1864. This land included four (4) allotments in the Parish of Toombul, fronting the Brisbane River. Subdivision of this land appeared to commence the following year when Dickson acquired part of the land. By 1873, an area of just under ten (10) acres of land, which included Toorak and grounds, had been transferred into Annie Dickson's name (Dickson's wife). Following Annie's death in 1880, the land was held by Dickson, as trustee.

Toorak was built of stone reputedly from the nearby Petrie quarries at Albion. It was designed and built in 1864 by the architect George Raymond Johnson (1849-1898) who lived nearby. The name Toorak is believed to have been derived from a house at Toorak in Melbourne owned by a relative of Dickson. Its design reflects the influence of the English Picturesque movement on Australian domestic architecture of the late nineteenth century.

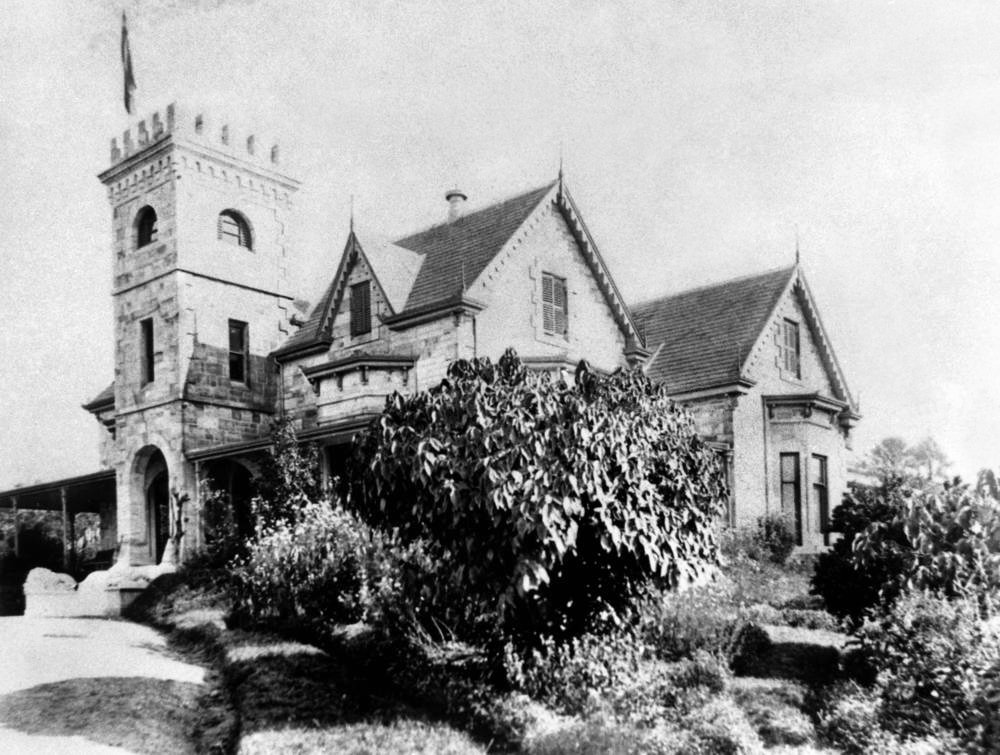
Toorak House, circa 1890

A photograph of Toorak taken c. 1885 shows that the house was originally single storeyed with a two level entry hall protruding through the verandah roof. The second storey appears to have been added by the 1890s. An upper section was added to the tower by the 1890s.

Dickson, accompanied by four of his daughters, travelled to Europe in early 1890, returning to Brisbane in late 1891. It is believed that while Dickson was overseas, he acquired the two marble lions which stand at the entrance of Toorak, and that he hired Italian artists to undertake decorative work inside Toorak.

Following Dickson's death in 1901, the land was transferred to Power and Agnes Dickson (two of his children) as trustees. By this time, Toorak stood on an area of just over four (4) acres. Toorak was leased by Eton High School (later St Margaret's Anglican Girls' School) run by the Sisters of Sacred Advent in 1907. Although Toorak was regarded as an ideal healthy environment for boarders, it was considered to be "too great a climb for day pupils", and the Sisters moved the school to Donatello c. 1910.

Additions to Toorak were undertaken by Richard Gailey in 1915.

Toorak was acquired by grazier George Moffatt in 1916, and then in 1929 by John Gibson of the pioneer sugar family. Subsequent owners were Brisbane businessman Patrick Woulfe, prominent grazier, philanthropist and art collector Harold de Vahl Rubin, and pastoralist Sir William Allen in 1963. Since Allen's death in 1977 Toorak has remained in the Allen family, and stands on an area of 7,535 square metres (81,110 sq ft).

== Description ==
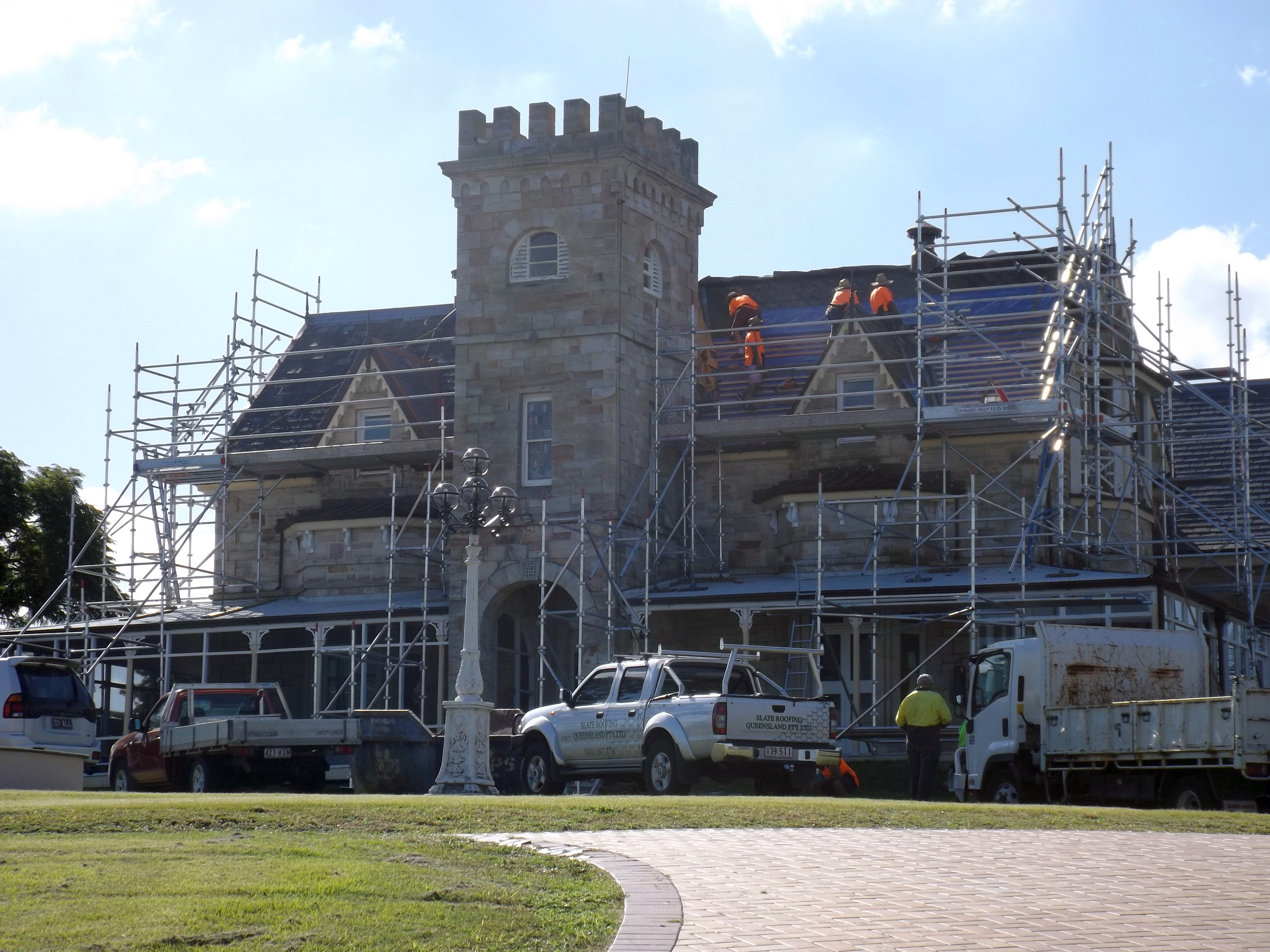
The building undergoing renovations, 2015

Toorak House is a substantial, Gothic-influenced, two storeyed sandstone residence with richly decorated interiors. It has steeply pitched shingle roofs and a single storeyed brick and corrugated iron wing attached to the rear. The house is impressively set within gardens containing mature trees and manicured garden beds, and sits on the crest of Hamilton Hill, commanding extensive views.

The south, principal elevation has a strong formal presence, with a crenellated square tower rising above the roofline flanked by two tall bay windows and steeply pitched dormer windows. The ground floor has a U-shaped timber verandah with a corrugated iron roof which has been enclosed with flyscreen to the west and glazing to the east. The main entrance comprises a flight of stone stairs guarded by a pair of lifesize marble lions, leading to an arched opening at the foot of the tower. The marble landing is inset with the word TOORAK. The east and west elevations of the sandstone house comprise two gables with tall bay windows; the southern gabled bays step out to align with the external face of the verandah. The first floor has small balconies with timber balustrades braced in diagonal patterns. The house has timber sash windows and French doors.

The sandstone house has decorative external detailing in stone and timber trim. The square-snecked rubble stonework is dressed with projecting quoins, keystones, toothed windows surrounds and string courses and the tower has an arched cornice. The roofs are decorated with scalloped barge boards, finials, and carved eaves brackets. The verandah has chamfered timber posts and ornamental timber valances.

The internal layout comprises four substantial and two smaller rooms either side of a central corridor on the ground floor, and four large and two small bedrooms on the upper floor. The entrance hall has frescos on the walls and ceilings, and is divided with a decorative arch. The rooms throughout the ground floor contain marble chimney breasts and rich plaster work and cornices. The joinery appears to be primarily cedar.

Timber stairs with carved newels located at the end of the corridor give access both to upstairs rooms and a sheeted storage area at half-landing level via coloured glass doors. The ceilings throughout the upper level are half-raked and follow the lines of the roofs. The floor level steps up toward the south, accommodating higher ceilings below. The principal rooms have dormer windows expressed in the ceilings, French doors glazed in geometric patterns opening onto small balconies, and circular timber ceiling roses. A small room at the end of the corridor contains narrow timber stairs leading to a platform at the top of the tower. This vantage point offers 360° views of Brisbane and surrounds.

The rear wing is a modest structure in Flemish bond brickwork, with timber windows and louvred French doors opening onto a verandah to the east. The building has been extended and modified to the north east, north west and west. It consists of a kitchen, several bedrooms and an office, also accessed from a central corridor. The corridor and the rooms to the west have flagstone floors, while the rooms to the east have timber floors. The western rooms have been extensively refurbished, while the eastern rooms retain their timber boarded and pressed metal ceilings.

The gardens provide a picturesque setting for the house. To the south, an oval rose garden encircled by an oval drive reinforces the formality of the front facade. The eastern garden is terraced, and the northern garden has lawn, a mature hedge and a brick outhouse with a convex corrugated iron roof. The grounds contain many substantial and mature trees, including mature palms, camphor laurels, jacarandas, liquidambars, and Moreton Bay chestnuts.

== Heritage listing ==
Toorak House was listed on the Queensland Heritage Register on 2 March 1994 having satisfied the following criteria.

The place is important in demonstrating the evolution or pattern of Queensland's history.

As a substantial stone residence established in the Breakfast Creek area, it demonstrates the pattern of settlement and growth in Brisbane from the 1860s.

The place is important in demonstrating the principal characteristics of a particular class of cultural places.

The house and its garden demonstrates the principal characteristics of a substantial villa residence influenced by the English Picturesque movement.

The place is important because of its aesthetic significance.

It is important in exhibiting aesthetic characteristics valued by the community, including:(i)its fine interiors; (ii)the impressive external form and its fine detail; and (iii)the picturesque quality of the mature gardens surrounding the house.

The place has a special association with the life or work of a particular person, group or organisation of importance in Queensland's history.

It has a special association with important political and social figures in 19th and 20th century Queensland (Dicksons, Moffatts, Gibsons, Woulfes, de Vahl Rubins, Allens).
