= James Drake (politician) =

Australian politician (1850–1941)

The Honourable James Drake
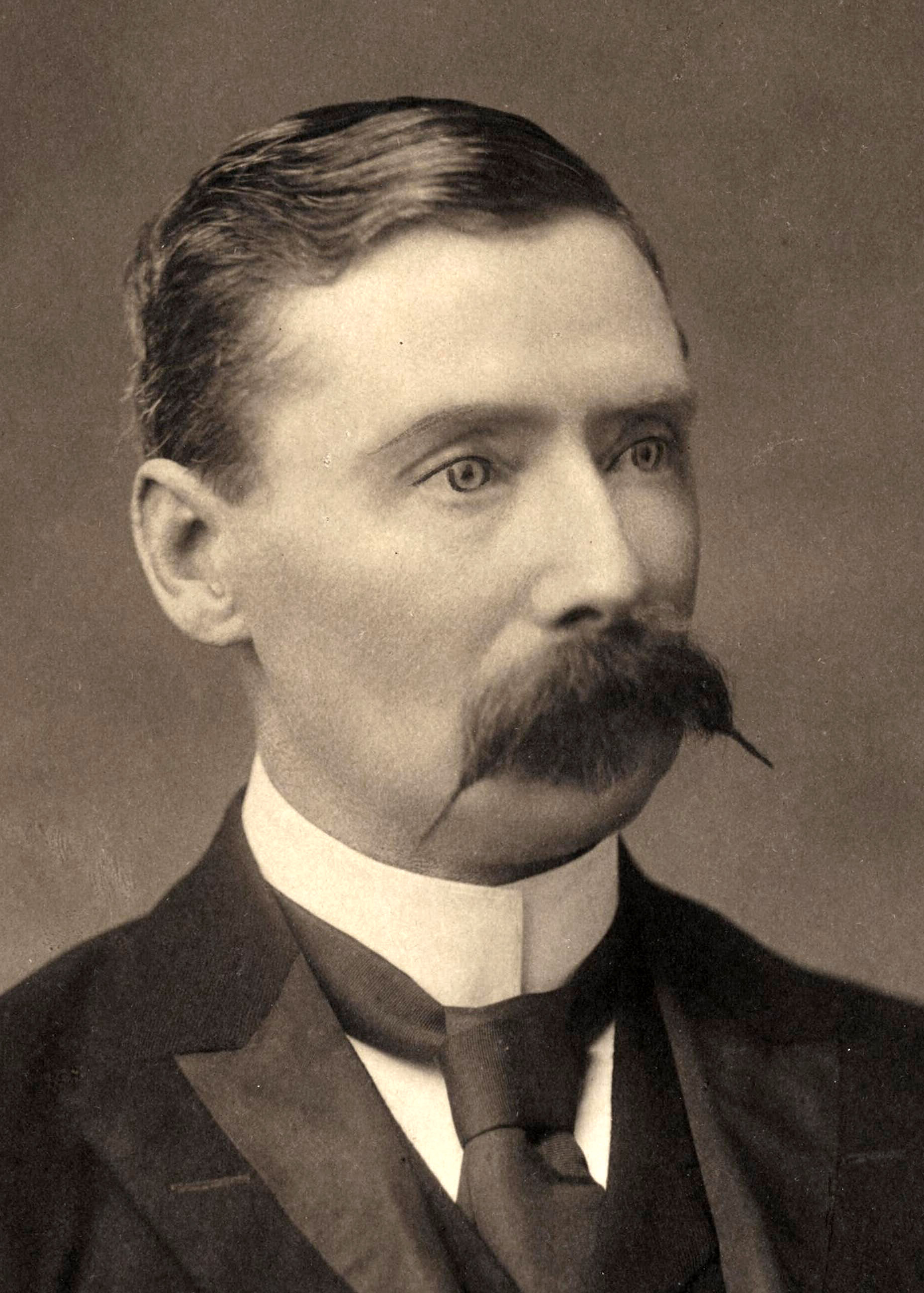

Attorney-General of Australia
- In office 24 September 1903 – 27 April 1904
- Prime Minister: Alfred Deakin
- Preceded by: Alfred Deakin
- Succeeded by: H. B. Higgins

Minister for Defence
- In office 10 August 1903 – 24 September 1903
- Prime Minister: Edmund Barton
- Preceded by: John Forrest
- Succeeded by: Austin Chapman

Postmaster-General of Australia
- In office 5 February 1901 – 10 August 1903
- Prime Minister: Edmund Barton
- Preceded by: John Forrest
- Succeeded by: Philip Fysh

Senator for Queensland
- In office 30 March 1901 – 31 December 1906

Member of the Queensland Legislative Council
- In office 17 December 1899 – 13 May 1901

Member of the Queensland Legislative Assembly for Enoggera
- In office 12 May 1888 – 7 December 1899
- Preceded by: James Dickson
- Succeeded by: Matthew Reid

Personal details
- Born: James George Drake; 26 April 1850 London, England, United Kingdom
- Died: 1 August 1941 (aged 91) Brisbane, Queensland, Australia
- Resting place: Toowong Cemetery
- Party: Protectionist Party
- Other political affiliations: Opposition (Queensland)
- Spouse: Mary Street (m. 1897–1924)
- Occupation: Barrister; Politician; Judge

James George Drake (26 April 1850 – 1 August 1941), often cited as J. G. Drake, was an Australian politician. After a number of years in Queensland colonial politics, he was elected to the Senate at the first federal election in 1901. He subsequently held ministerial office under prime ministers Edmund Barton, Alfred Deakin, and George Reid, serving as Postmaster-General (1901–1903), Minister for Defence (1903), Attorney-General (1903–1904), and Vice-President of the Executive Council (1904–1905).

== Early life ==
Drake was born on 26 April 1850 in London, England. He was the son of Ann (née Hyde) and Edward Drake, his father being a publican. He was educated at King's College School and then worked for merchant firms for several years. Drake left London in October 1873 and arrived in Brisbane in January 1874. He sought work unsuccessfully in the tin mines at Stanthorpe before finding employment as a store clerk in Toowoomba, later returning to Brisbane. He also spent some time as a jackaroo in western Queensland.

== Journalism and legal career ==
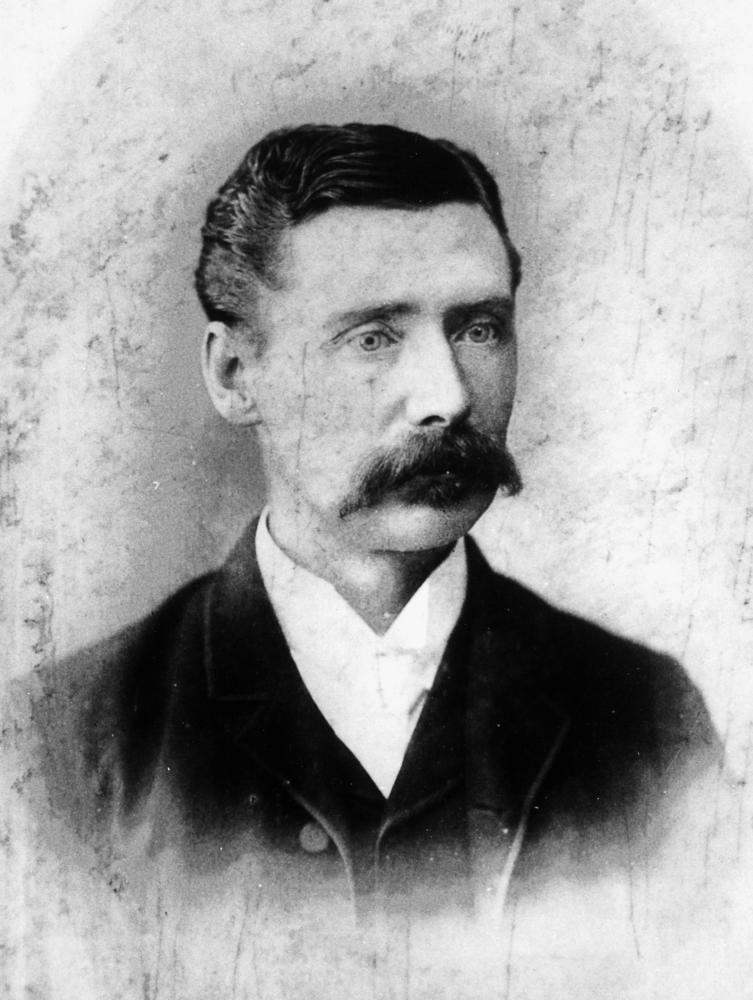
Drake in 1889

In 1875, Drake began working as a journalist with the Bundaberg Star. He subsequently moved to the Daily Northern Argus (Rockhampton) and then returned to Brisbane to work on the Telegraph and Courier (as leader writer). For a brief period he moved to Melbourne and worked as a parliamentary reporter for the Argus. Upon his return to Queensland he joined the staff of Hansard, making use of his shorthand skills in transcribing debates in the colonial parliament; he was president of the Queensland Shorthand Writers' Association.

Drake began reading law in May 1881 and was admitted to the bar in June 1882. He established a "flourishing practice" in partnership with Magnus Jensen. His radical views led to a friendship with the utopian socialist William Lane, and in 1887 he became a shareholder, writer, and joint editor of Lane's weekly newspaper The Boomerang.

== Military service ==
Drake was commissioned as a lieutenant in the Queensland Defence Force in 1886, and promoted to captain in 1888 and major in 1900.

== Colonial politics ==
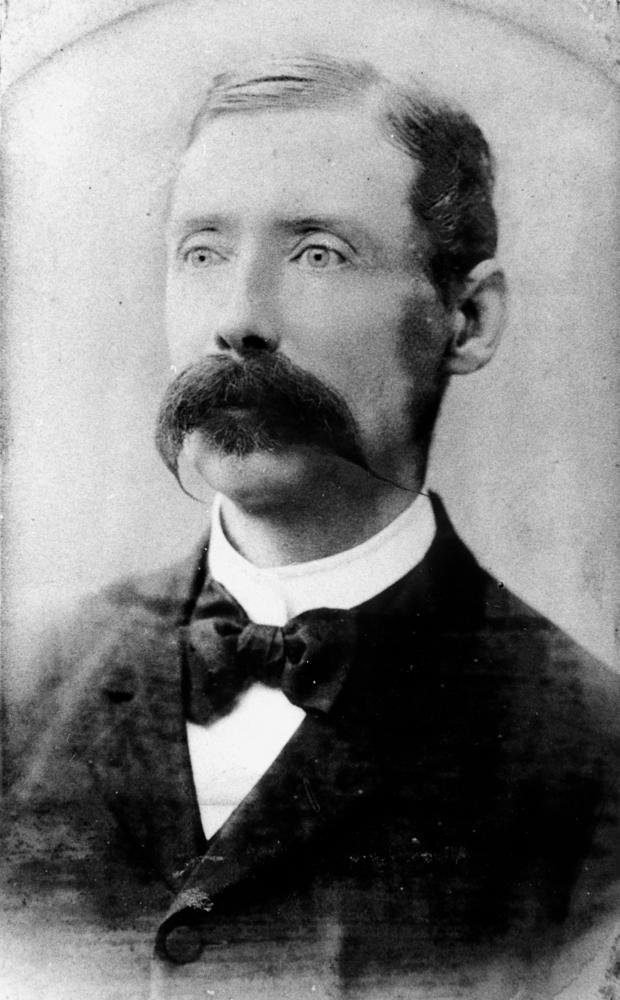
Drake in 1899

Drake was a member of the Legislative Assembly of Queensland for the Electoral district of Enoggera from 12 May 1888 to 7 December 1899. Following his period as an elected representative, he was appointed a life Member of the Legislative Council of Queensland on 7 December 1899, during which he was Postmaster-General and Secretary for Public Instruction in Queensland. Although membership of the Legislative Council was a life appointment, he resigned on 13 May 1901 in order to pursue a career in newly established federal parliament.

== Federal politics ==
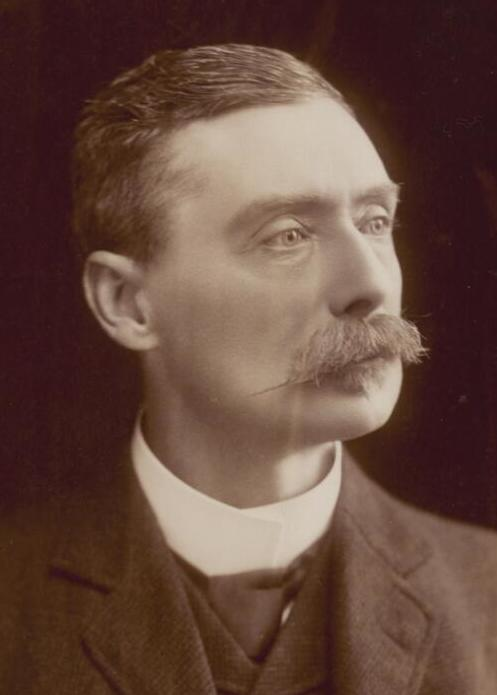
Drake c. 1900

After Federation on 1 January 1901, Edmund Barton formed a caretaker ministry with James Dickson as Queensland's sole representative. Dickson's sudden death just over a week later caused Barton to seek another Queenslander to join his ministry. Philp recommended that Drake be offered the position, and as a result he was appointed Postmaster-General on 5 February 1901. He was elected to the Senate as a Protectionist at the inaugural federal election held the following month.

Drake was tasked with establishing a national post and telegraph system from the six existing colonial systems. He secured the passage of the Post and Telegraph Act 1901, in his second reading speech expressing the need for non-discrimination in the provision of services and the advantages of a publicly owned telegraph service. He was generally regarded as a competent administrator, although his appointment of Queenslander Robert Scott as the inaugural head of the Postmaster-General's Department led to accusation of state bias. Punch regarded him as "a plodder – thorough rather than brilliant".

Following a reshuffle in August 1903, Drake replaced John Forrest as Minister for Defence. He held the position for only six weeks, as Attorney-General Alfred Deakin replaced Barton as prime minister the following month and appointed Drake as his successor. He presented the Commonwealth's arguments in D'Emden v Pedder, one of the first significant constitutional cases decided by the High Court of Australia. Drake was a strong supporter of the White Australia policy. Days before the 1903 federal election, in response to the Petriana affair, he stated that its provisions should even extend to shipwrecked sailors. The Argus reported he had told an election meeting in Sydney:

It was undesirable that educated gentlemen who had been in gaol, or coloured men who had been shipwrecked, should land in Australia in defiance of the law. They intended to keep their race pure, and make Australia a place worth living in.

Deakin's first government fell in April 1904. After a brief interlude of Australian Labor Party (ALP) government led by Chris Watson, opposition leader George Reid formed a coalition government of his Free Traders and the Protectionists willing to support him. Drake joined the government as Vice-President of the Executive Council and Leader of the Government in the Senate, holding office until the government fell in July 1905. He was not invited to join the Second Deakin ministry, although in January 1906 he established Commonwealth, a broadsheet designed to counter anti-federation feeling in Queensland. He lost preselection prior to the 1906 federal election, and decided to retire from federal politics rather than stand for re-election as an independent.

== Affiliation ==
Drake was a founding member of Brisbane's Johnsonian Club.

== Later life ==
Drake stood for the Queensland state seat of North Brisbane in 1907, but only gained 137 votes. He was state crown prosecutor from 1910 to 1920 and in 1912 was appointed Acting Deputy Judge of the District Court of Queensland.

== Death ==
He died in Brisbane Hospital and was buried in Toowong Cemetery. He was the last surviving member of the Barton, Reid and the first Deakin Cabinet. Drake was survived by four children from his marriage to Mary Street in 1897.

Political offices
Preceded by James Dickson & Robert Bulcock (dual-member constituency)	Legislative Assembly of Queensland; Electoral district of Enoggera; 12 May 1888 – 7 December 1899	Succeeded by Matthew Reid
Preceded by	Legislative Council of Queensland; 7 December 1899 – 13 May 1901	Succeeded by
Preceded by John Forrest	Postmaster-General; 1901–1903	Succeeded by Philip Fysh
Preceded by Alfred Deakin	Attorney General; 1903–1904	Succeeded by H. B. Higgins
Preceded by John Forrest	Minister for Defence; 1901–1903	Succeeded by Austin Chapman
Preceded by Gregor McGregor	Vice-President of the Executive Council; 1904–1905	Succeeded by Thomas Ewing
