= Fortitude (1842 ship) =

Barque launched at Scarborough in 1842

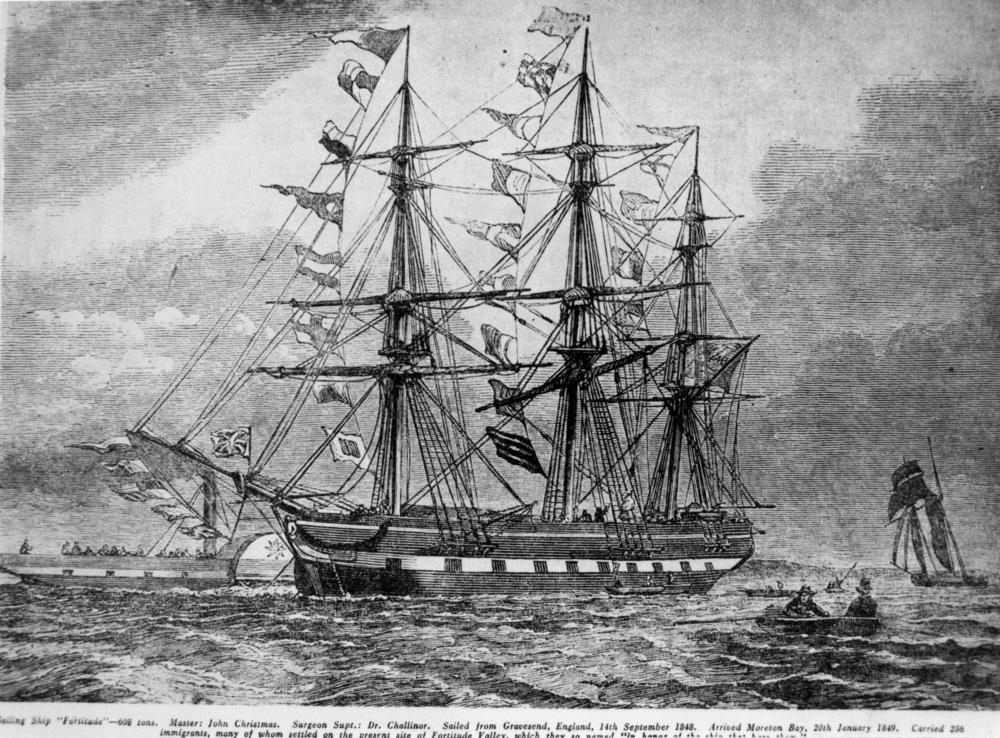
- The Fortitude

History

United Kingdom
- Name: Fortitude
- Builder: Tindall, Scarborough
- Launched: 1842
- Fate: Wrecked circa 1866

General characteristics
- Class & type: Barque
- Tons burthen: Old Act: 519 (bm); New Act (post 1836): 608, 640, or 750 (bm)
- Length: 127 ft 5 in (38.8 m)
- Beam: 27 ft 0 in (8.2 m)
- Depth: 20 ft 7 in (6.3 m)

Fortitude was a barque launched at Scarborough in 1842. In the 1840s she brought free settlers to the colonies of South Australia and Queensland. Thereafter she sailed to India and China, and made one more voyage carrying female immigrants to Port Phillip. She was wrecked circa 1866.

== History ==
Fortitude first appeared in Lloyd's Register (LR) in 1842.

Year	Master	Owner	Trade	Source & notes
1842	Buckham	Tindalls	Scarborough–London	LR

=== Migrants to South Australia ===
Fortitude, Captain James Douglas, arrived in South Australia on 5 April 1842, bringing 27 free settlers to Adelaide.

Year	Master	Owner	Trade	Source
1844	Buckham	Tindalls	Scarborough–London; London–Ceylon	LR
1845	Buckham; Christmas	Tindalls	London–Ceylon	LR
1847		Tindalls	London	LR

=== Migrants to Queensland ===
In 1848–9, she was the first of three ships chartered by the Rev Dr John Dunmore Lang to bring free immigrants to Brisbane, Australia, arriving on 21 January 1849. Captained by John Christmas, with the medical superintendent Henry Challinor, she departed Gravesend on 14 September 1848 and arrived at Moreton Bay on 21 January 1849. (Note: Fortitude Valley, where many of the 1849 immigrants settled and is now a suburb of Brisbane, is named in her honour.) (Note: The other ships were Chaseley, arriving on 1 May 1849, and Lima, arriving on 3 November 1849.)

== Subsequent trade ==
Year	Master	Owner	Trade	Source & notes
1850	Christmas	Tindalls	London	LR
1851	Christmas	Tindalls	London–Bombay	LR
1852	Christmas; Heyward	Tindalls	London–Ceylon; Portsmouth–Port Phillip	LR

In 1852–1853, Fortitude. Captain Heyward, carried 50 women to Port Phillip. The women were the 21st party to travel under the auspices of the Female Emigration Fund. Some women who paid their own way also made the journey.

Year	Master	Owner	Trade	Source & notes
1853	Heyward	Tindalls	Portsmouth–Port Phillip	LR
1856	Harrison	Tindalls	London	LR
1857	Harrison	Tindalls	London–Ceylon	LR
1859	Rodgers	Tindalls	London	LR; small repairs 1858
1861	Parsons	Tindalls	London–Ceylon	LR; small repairs 1858, 1859, & 1861
1862	Parsons; J.Booth	Tindalls; R.Guy	London–Ceylon	LR; small repairs 1858, 1859, & 1861

With the change of ownership from Tidalls to Guy, Fortitude's homeport changed from Sunderland to Newry.

Year	Master	Owner	Trade	Source & notes
1863	J.Booth	R.Guy	Newry–United States	LR; small repairs 1858, 1859, & 1861

== Fate ==
In 1865 Fortitude, Booth, master, sailed to Toulon, then Singapore, and back to London. There is no readily available ship arrival and departure data after her return in November 1865. A typhoon drove a barque named Fortitude ashore at Kowloon, damaging her. At this point it is a conjecture that the barque in Kowloon was the Fortitude of this article.

LR for 1866 carried the annotation "Wrecked" under Fortitude's name.

== Notable immigrants on the Fortitude ==
=== South Australia ===
- W.P. Auld, Adelaide vigneron and explorer
- James Philcox, land speculator who named two villages (now suburbs) in Adelaide

=== Brisbane ===
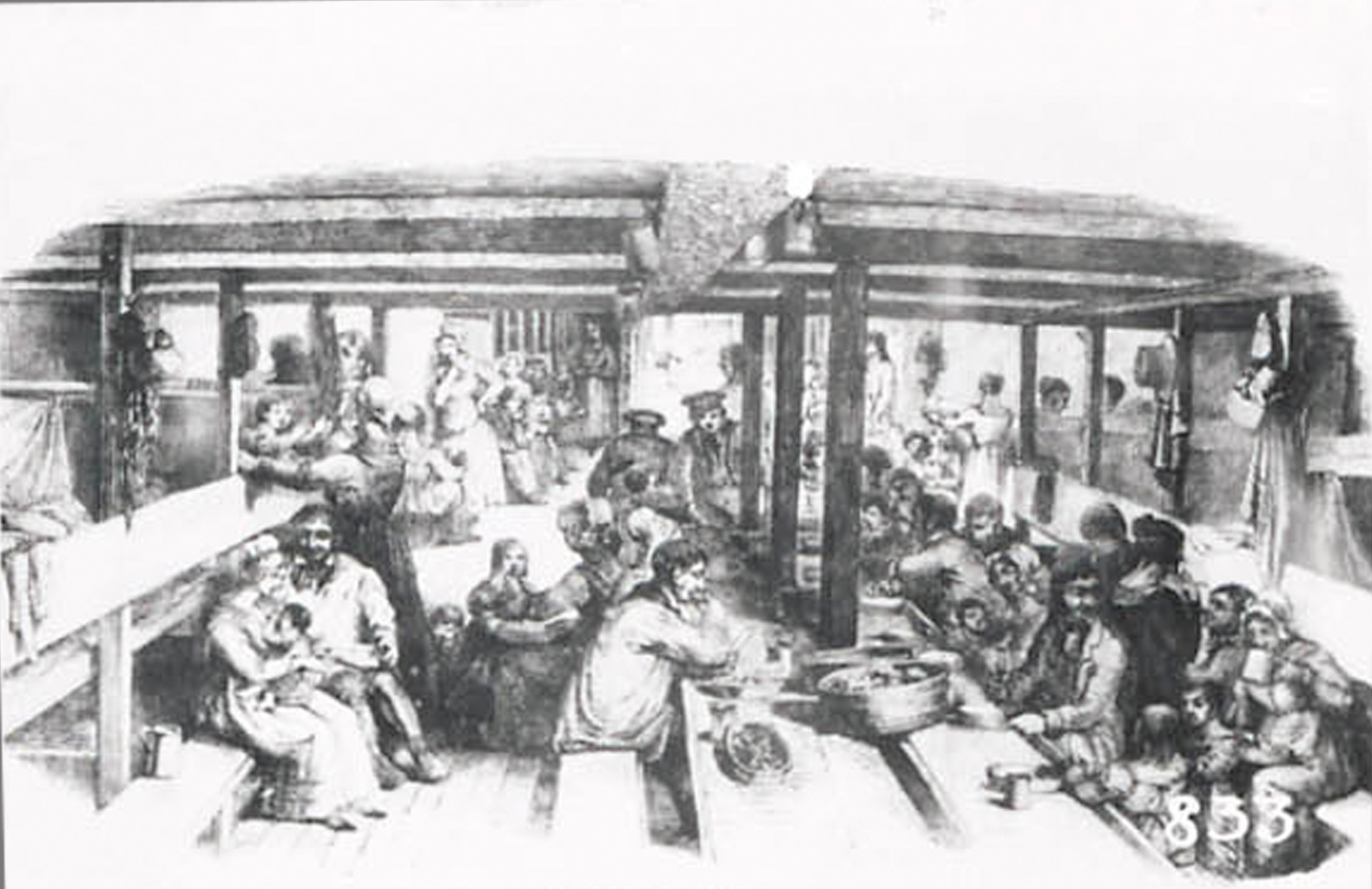
Migrants at dinner on the Fortitude, circa 1848

- Henry Challinor, physician and politician of Ipswich
- Robert Cribb, politician of Brisbane
- William Pettigrew, politician and mayor of Brisbane
- Edward Barton Southerden, draper and mayor of Sandgate
