= John Lloyd Bale =

Australian politician

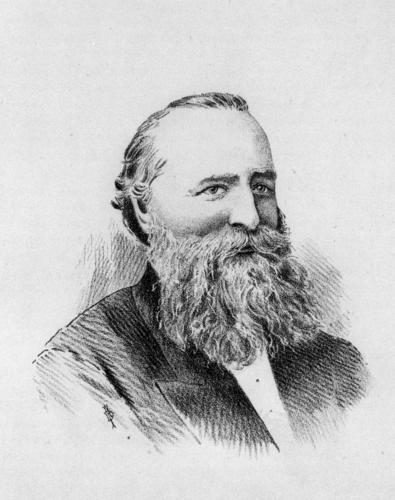

Member of the Queensland Legislative Assembly for Enoggera
- In office 21 August 1883 – 13 October 1885 Serving with James Dickson
- Preceded by: Arthur Rutledge
- Succeeded by: Robert Bulcock

Personal details
- Born: 18 January 1837 London, England
- Died: 22 November 1885 (aged 48) Oxley, Queensland, Queensland
- Resting place: Toowong Cemetery
- Spouse: Eliza Slaughter
- Occupation: Storekeeper, bookkeeper, company secretary

John Lloyd Bale (18 January 1837 – 22 November 1885) was a banker and politician in Queensland, Australia. He founded a number of thrifts including what is now the Bank of Queensland. He was a Member of the Queensland Legislative Assembly.

== Early life ==
He was born in London, the eldest son of John Bale and Hannah (née Lloyd) Bale. He immigrated to Brisbane (then in the Colony of New South Wales) on the Chaseley arriving 1 May 1849 with his parents and siblings. He married Eliza Slaughter on 4 August 1855 and they had three sons and three daughters.

== Business ==
He initially worked in a hardware business but was insolvent in 1859. His circumstances improved and he went on to found a number of thrifts including the entity that is now the Bank of Queensland. He was chief executive of the latter until poor health led to his resignation in 1884. His brother Benjamin Robert Bale succeeded as chief executive for about the next 20 years.

== Politics ==
John Lloyd Bale was an Alderman of the Brisbane City Council from 1872 until 1884 and Member of the Queensland Legislative Assembly for Enoggera from 21 August 1883 to 13 October 1885.

== Later life ==
Bale died 22 November 1885 and was buried in Toowong Cemetery.

Parliament of Queensland
Preceded by Arthur Rutledge	Member for Enoggera; 1883–1885; Served alongside: James Dickson	Succeeded by Robert Bulcock
