= Chaseley (ship) =

History
- Name: Chaseley
- Launched: 1845, Sunderland

General characteristics
- Tons burthen: 515 tons (new measurement); 468 tons (old measurement)

Chaseley was a sailing ship. In 1848–49, she was one of three ships chartered by the Rev Dr John Dunmore Lang to bring free immigrants to Brisbane, Australia; the other ships being the Fortitude and the Lima.

== History ==
The Chaseley's captain was C. F. Aldridge and its medical superintendent was William Hobbs. The Chaseley departed The Downs on 27 December 1848 and arrived in Moreton Bay on 1 May 1849.

== Notable immigrants on Chaseley ==
- John Lloyd Bale, banker and politician of Brisbane
- Benjamin Cribb, businessman and politician of Ipswich
- George Grimes, farmer and member of the Queensland Legislative Assembly
- Samuel Grimes, farmer and member of the Queensland Legislative Assembly
- Mary McConnel, founder of the Royal Children's Hospital, Brisbane
