= James Johnston (Queensland politician) =

Australian politician

Member of the Queensland Legislative Assembly for Bulimba
- In office 7 July 1876 – 3 November 1876
- Preceded by: William Hemmant
- Succeeded by: George Grimes

Personal details
- Born: James Johnston; 1820 Edinburgh, Scotland
- Died: 3 November 1876 (aged 55-56) Brisbane, Queensland, Australia
- Spouse: Ellen Severight
- Occupation: Night school teacher

James Johnston (c. 1820–1875) was a politician in Queensland, Australia. He was a Member of the Queensland Legislative Assembly.

== Early life ==
He was born in Edinburgh, Scotland in about 1820. He was the son of Robert Melrose and Jane Johnston. He formerly belonged to the Presbyterian church, but later converted to the Baptist church.

== Family history ==
He married Ellen Severight in Dundee, Scotland. Together they had 6 sons and 3 daughters.

== Career ==
He had a career as a Night School teacher.

== Parliamentary career ==
On 7 July 1876, he was elected to the Queensland parliament as the member for the electoral district of Bulimba, but served only 119 days before his death in Brisbane, Queensland, Australia on 3 November 1876.

Parliament of Queensland
Preceded by William Hemmant	Member for Bulimba; 1876	Succeeded by George Grimes
