= Lima (1846 ship) =

History
- Name: Lima
- Launched: 1846, Peterhead

General characteristics
- Tons burthen: 349 tons

Lima was a sailing ship. In 1848–1849, she was one of three ships chartered by the Rev Dr John Dunmore Lang to bring free immigrants to Brisbane, Australia; the other ships being Fortitude and Chaseley.

Captain Yule was in charge of Lima. Lima arrived in Moreton Bay on 3 November 1849.
