= Electoral district of Enoggera =

Former state electoral district of Queensland, Australia

Enoggera Queensland—Legislative Assembly
- State: Queensland
- Created: 1873
- Abolished: 1950
- Namesake: Enoggera, Queensland

Enoggera was an electoral district of the Legislative Assembly in the Australian state of Queensland. It existed from 1873 to 1950 and centred on the suburb of Enoggera in Brisbane.

The electorate was created by the Electoral Districts Act of 1872. From 1873 to 1878 it returned a single member. From 1878 to 1888 it became a dual member constituency (returning two members). From 1888 to 1950 it reverted to returning a single member.

In 1950 an electoral redistribution resulted in the name being dropped, with the bulk of its territory being split between Kedron and Mount Coot-tha.

== Members for Enoggera ==
The members representing the electoral district of Enoggera are listed below.

Member	Party	Term
James Dickson	Ministerialist	28 November 1873 – 21 November 1878

Member	Party	Term	Member	Party	Term
James Dickson	Ministerialist	21 November 1878 – 12 May 1888	Arthur Rutledge	Ministerialist	21 November 1878 – 18 August 1883
James Dickson	Ministerialist	21 November 1878 – 12 May 1888	John Bale		18 August 1883 – 13 October 1885
James Dickson	Ministerialist	21 November 1878 – 12 May 1888	Robert Bulcock		26 October 1885 – 12 May 1888

Member	Party	Term
James Drake	Opposition	12 May 1888 – 7 December 1899
Matthew Reid	Australian Labor Party	23 December 1899 – 11 March 1902
Arthur Hawthorn	Ministerialist	11 March 1902 – 7 February 1911
Richard Trout	Ministerialist	25 February 1911 – 22 May 1915
William Lloyd	Australian Labor Party	22 May 1915 – 9 October 1920
James Kerr	National, United, Country National	9 October 1920 – 11 June 1932
George Taylor	Australian Labor Party, Independent Labor	11 June 1932 – 15 April 1944
Kenneth Morris	Qld People's Party	15 April 1944 – 29 April 1950

== See also ==
- Electoral districts of Queensland
- Members of the Queensland Legislative Assembly by year
- Category:Members of the Queensland Legislative Assembly by name
