= William Hemmant =

Australian politician (1837–1916)

The Hon William Hemmant
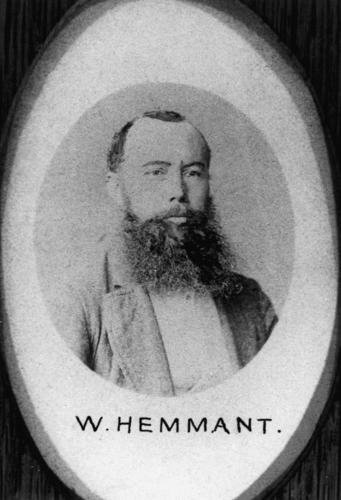

9th Treasurer of Queensland
- In office 8 January 1874 – 5 June 1876
- Preceded by: Joshua Bell
- Succeeded by: James Dickson
- Constituency: Bulimba

Member of the Queensland Legislative Assembly for East Moreton
- In office 4 November 1871 – 24 November 1873 Serving with Samuel Griffith
- Preceded by: Henry Jordan
- Succeeded by: Seat abolished

Member of the Queensland Legislative Assembly for Bulimba
- In office 25 November 1873 – 26 June 1876
- Preceded by: New seat
- Succeeded by: James Johnston

Personal details
- Born: 24 October 1837 Kirkgate, Yorkshire, England
- Died: 20 September 1916 (aged 78) Sevenoaks, Kent, England
- Spouse: Lucy Elizabeth Ground
- Relations: Sir James Atkin (son-in-law)
- Children: George Hemmant (son)
- Occupation: Draper, goldminer, surveyor

William Hemmant (24 November 1837 – 20 September 1916) was a British-Australian politician who served in the Legislative Assembly of Queensland from 1871 to 1876.

Hemmant was born in Kirkgate, Yorkshire, England, to Thomas and Isabella (née Richmond) on 24 November 1837. He worked as a draper in London before moving in 1859 to Ballarat, Victoria, where he worked as miner during the gold rush. He moved to Brisbane the following year, where he established a drapery shop with Alexander Stewart. The Great Fire of Brisbane in 1864 was said by some to have started in the Stewart and Hemmant shop, and the two gave evidence during a colonial inquiry into the fire. Nonetheless, the two built a successful department store and clothing manufactury.

He travelled to England to marry Lucy Ground on 20 September 1866, and returned to Brisbane early the next year. In 1869 he built Eldernell House (named for a settlement in Cambridgeshire, near his wife's birthplace) which is now the home of the Anglican Archbishop of Brisbane.

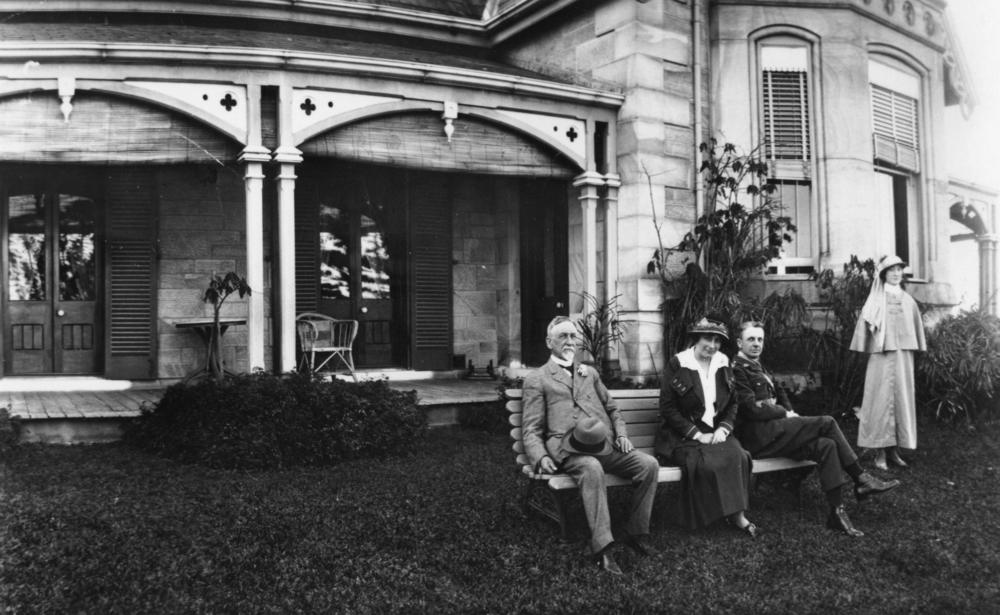
Eldernell in the suburb of Hamilton, photographed circa 1919

Hemmant was a director of the Australian Bank of Commerce and an alderman on the Brisbane City Council. He won the seat of East Moreton in the Legislative Assembly in 1871, and successfully contested Bulimba in 1873. He served as Colonial Treasurer from 1874 to 1876. He is credited with producing four badges as candidates for the Flag of Queensland, from which the current badge, a crowned Maltese cross, was chosen.

After he left politics in 1876, he returned to England with his family, settling in Kent. He built a house called Bulimba in Sevenoaks. Hemmant and Lucy had 10 children, one of whom was colonial administrator George Hemmant.

William Hemmant died on 20 September 1916, his 50th wedding anniversary.

== Legacy ==
The south Brisbane suburb of Hemmant is named after him.

== Sources ==
- "William Hemmant". Re-Member. Queensland Parliamentary Library.

== See also ==
- Hemmant, Queensland

Parliament of Queensland
Preceded by Henry Jordan	Member for East Moreton; 1871–1873; Served alongside: Samuel Griffith	District abolished
New seat	Member for Bulimba; 1873–1876	Succeeded by James Johnston
