= Aaron Dillaway =

Australian Liberal National politician

Aaron Dillaway MP

Member of the Queensland Parliament for Bulimba
- In office 24 March 2012 – 31 January 2015
- Preceded by: Di Farmer
- Succeeded by: Di Farmer

Personal details
- Born: 23 March 1971 (age 55) Brisbane, Queensland, Australia
- Party: Liberal National

Aaron Stuart Dillaway (born 23 March 1971) is an Australian Liberal National politician who was the member of the Legislative Assembly of Queensland for Bulimba, having defeated Di Farmer, the incumbent, at the 2012 state election. After the initial count showed Dillaway had won by 85 votes, a recount confirmed his victory by 74 votes. He was only the third conservative to hold the seat since 1915, and the first since 1932. Farmer defeated him in a rematch in 2015.

Parliament of Queensland
Preceded by Di Farmer	Member for Bulimba; 2012–2015	Succeeded by Di Farmer
