= Frederick ffoulkes Swanwick =

Australian politician

Frederick Swanwick
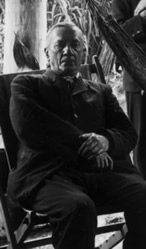

Member of the Queensland Legislative Assembly for Bulimba
- In office 29 November 1878 – 4 July 1882
- Preceded by: George Grimes
- Succeeded by: John Buckland

Personal details
- Born: Frederick ffoulkes Swanwick; 1839 Middleton, Lancashire, England
- Died: 20 September 1913 (aged 73-74) Norman Park, Queensland, Australia
- Resting place: Nundah Cemetery
- Spouse: Elizabeth Fox (m.1864 d.1926)
- Occupation: Barrister

Frederick ffoulkes Swanwick (1839-1913) was a politician in Queensland, Australia. He was a Member of the Queensland Legislative Assembly.

He represented the electoral district of Bulimba from 29 November 1878 to 4 July 1882. He was previously a schoolmaster and a barrister. After becoming insolvent and being struck off the Roll of the Queensland Bar in 1882, he established a legal coaching school at his residence in Norman Park, Brisbane. He was the first teacher at Hemmant State School, originally called Bulimba Creek School, which opened in 1864.

Parliament of Queensland
Preceded by George Grimes	Member for Bulimba; 1878–1882	Succeeded by John Buckland
