= George Grimes (Queensland politician) =

Australian politician

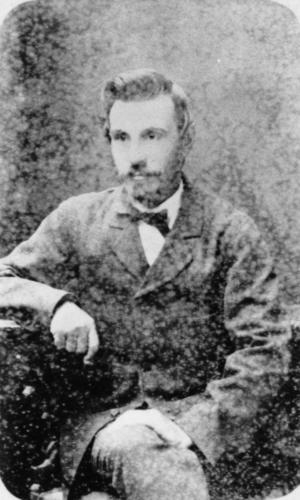

Member of the Queensland Legislative Assembly for Bulimba
- In office 18 November 1876 – 29 November 1878
- Preceded by: James Johnston
- Succeeded by: Frederick Swanwick

Personal details
- Born: George Grimes; 17 December 1835 Ashby-de-la-Zouch, Leicestershire, England
- Died: 28 January 1910 (aged 74) Fairfield, Queensland, Australia
- Resting place: South Brisbane Cemetery
- Spouse: Mary Rogers (m.1863 d.1919)
- Relations: Samuel Grimes (brother)
- Occupation: Farmer

George Grimes (17 December 1835 – 28 January 1910) was a member of the Queensland Legislative Assembly.

== Biography ==
Grimes was born in Ashby-de-la-Zouch, Leicestershire, the son of William Grimes and his wife Mary (née Douglas). After arriving in Australia in 1849 on board the Chaseley, he took up farming at Kurilpa with his brother Samuel in 1857 before moving to Coongoon at Fairfield where he grew arrowroot and sugar in 1863.

On 16 June 1863 Grimes married Mary Rogers (died 1919) and together had a son and five daughters. Grimes died in January 1910 and his funeral proceeded from Ashby House, his residence at Fairfield to the South Brisbane Cemetery.

== Public career ==
Following the death of the sitting member for Bulimba, James Johnston, Grimes won the November 1876 by-election defeating his opponents McMaster and Thorne. He was defeated at the 1878 Queensland colonial election by Frederick Swanwick. Grimes had also served as a councilor on the Stephens Shire Council.

His brother, Samuel Grimes, was a long-serving member of the Queensland Parliament having represented the seat of Oxley for over 23 years.

Parliament of Queensland
Preceded by James Johnston	Member for Bulimba; 1876–1878	Succeeded by Frederick Swanwick
