= John Francis Buckland =

Australian politician

John Buckland
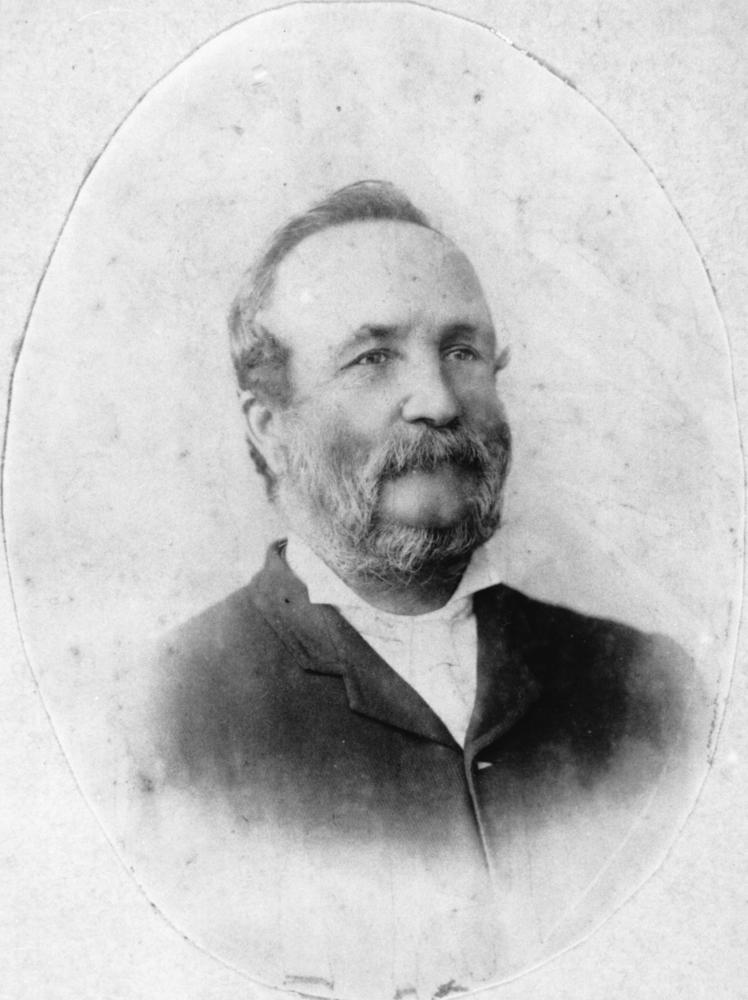

Member of the Queensland Legislative Assembly for Bulimba
- In office 13 July 1882 – 29 March 1892
- Preceded by: Frederick Swanwick
- Succeeded by: James Dickson

Personal details
- Born: John Francis Buckland; 1832 Runnymede, Wraysbury, England
- Died: 21 September 1910 (aged 77–78) Brisbane, Queensland, Australia
- Resting place: Nundah Cemetery
- Spouse: Ellen Gertrude Ashton (d.1911)
- Occupation: Auctioneer

John Francis Buckland (1832–1910) was an auctioneer and a Member of the Legislative Assembly of Queensland.

== Private life ==
John Francis Buckland was born in Runnymede, Wraysbury, England in 1832 in a farmhouse that was a former hunting lodge of King John. He immigrated to Queensland in 1862 from England.

His wife was Ellen Gertrude Ashton, daughter of Joseph Ashton and Mary Hewison.

Buckland died on 21 September 1910 and was buried on 22 September 1910 in Nundah Cemetery. He was survived by his wife, who died 8 October 1911.

== Business life ==
On arrival in Queensland in 1862, he established an auctioneering partnership with Simon Fraser (Fraser & Buckland, 1863–1873). His uncle, William Thomas Buckland, was an auctioneer in Windsor, England. Later he was in business on his own account as an auctioneer and broker.

== Public life ==
Buckland was a member of the Toombul Shire Council and its chairman from 1883 to 1885.

On 13 July 1882, he was elected through a by-election as Member of the Legislative Assembly of Queensland representing Bulimba. He was re-elected in 1883 and 1888, and resigned on 29 March 1892 in order to attend to his own financial affairs during an economic depression.

Parliament of Queensland
Preceded by Frederick Swanwick	Member for Bulimba; 1882–1892	Succeeded by James Dickson
