= Pat Purcell =

Australian politician

Member of the Queensland Legislative Assembly for Bulimba
- In office 19 September 1992 – 20 March 2009
- Preceded by: Ron McLean
- Succeeded by: Di Farmer

Minister for Emergency Services
- In office 28 July 2005 – 4 July 2007
- Premier: Peter Beattie
- Preceded by: Neil Roberts
- Succeeded by: Chris Cummins

Parliamentary Secretary to the Minister for Public Works, Housing and Racing
- In office 12 February 2004 – 28 July 2005
- Premier: Peter Beattie
- Preceded by: new portfolio
- Succeeded by: position abolished

Deputy Government Whip
- In office 30 July 1998 – 11 February 2004
- Premier: Peter Beattie
- Preceded by: Rob Mitchell
- Succeeded by: Rachel Nolan

Personal details
- Born: Patrick Douglas Purcell; 17 March 1947 (age 79) Cowra, New South Wales, Australia
- Party: Labor
- Occupation: Trade union industry

Patrick Douglas Purcell (born 17 March 1947) is an Australian politician. He was a Labor member of the Legislative Assembly of Queensland for Bulimba from 1992 to 2009.

== Early life ==
Purcell was born in the New South Wales town of Cowra. Prior to election to parliament he was the secretary of the Australian Building Construction Employees' and Builders Labourers' Federation (Queensland Branch).

== Politics ==
Purcell entered parliament at the 1992 state election as the member for Bulimba. He held the seat until his retirement in 2009.

Purcell served as the Minister for Emergency Services from July 2005 to July 2007 in the Beattie Ministry. Before that he was the Parliamentary Secretary to the Minister for Public Works, Housing and Racing. On 4 July 2007, Pat Purcell announced he would resign as Minister after allegations arose that he assaulted two public servants. The subsequently proven allegations forced the then Queensland Premier Anna Bligh told him "he had no choice but to resign". Those charges were subsequently withdrawn following mediation.

Purcell did not contest the 2009 Queensland state election.

Purcell’s youngest son, Daniel Raymond Joseph Purcell was imprisoned for drug trafficking related charges in 2009.

Parliament of Queensland
Preceded by Ron McLean	Member for Bulimba; 1992–2009	Succeeded by Di Farmer
