= Di Farmer =

Australian politician

The Honourable Di Farmer MP
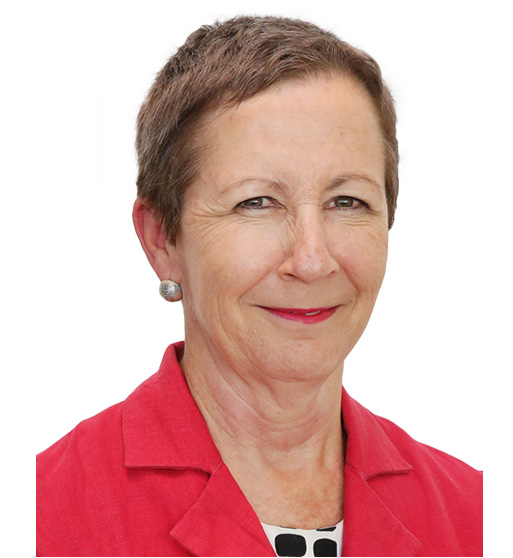

Minister for Education and Youth Justice
- In office 18 December 2023 – 28 October 2024
- Premier: Steven Miles
- Preceded by: Grace Grace

Minister for Training and Skills Development of Queensland
- In office 12 November 2020 – 18 December 2023
- Premier: Annastacia Palaszczuk; Steven Miles
- Preceded by: Shannon Fentiman
- Succeeded by: Lance McCallum (as Minister for Training and Skills)

Minister for Employment and Small Business of Queensland
- In office 12 November 2020 – 18 December 2023
- Premier: Annastacia Palaszczuk; Steven Miles
- Preceded by: Shannon Fentiman
- Succeeded by: Lance McCallum

Minister for Child Safety, Youth and Women of Queensland
- In office 12 December 2017 – 12 November 2020
- Premier: Annastacia Palaszczuk
- Preceded by: Shannon Fentiman
- Succeeded by: Leanne Linard (Child Safety); Shannon Fentiman (Women)

Minister for the Prevention of Domestic and Family Violence of Queensland
- In office 11 December 2017 – 12 November 2020
- Premier: Annastacia Palaszczuk
- Preceded by: Shannon Fentiman
- Succeeded by: Shannon Fentiman

Deputy Speaker of the Queensland Legislative Assembly
- In office 7 December 2015 – 12 December 2017
- Preceded by: Grace Grace
- Succeeded by: Scott Stewart

Member of the Queensland Parliament for Bulimba
- Incumbent
- Assumed office 31 January 2015
- Preceded by: Aaron Dillaway
- In office 21 March 2009 – 24 March 2012
- Preceded by: Pat Purcell
- Succeeded by: Aaron Dillaway

Personal details
- Born: 12 February 1961 (age 65) Brisbane, Queensland
- Party: Labor
- Education: University of Queensland
- Profession: Speech pathologist

Dianne Elizabeth Farmer (born 12 February 1961) is an Australian politician. She was previously the Minister for Education and Minister for Youth Justice of Queensland. She was first elected for the seat of Bulimba to the Queensland State Parliament for the Labor Party at the 2009 Queensland election but lost her seat at the 2012 election to Aaron Dillaway of the Liberal National Party. Farmer defeated Dillaway at the 2015 election to regain Bulimba for Labor and was re-elected in 2017 and 2020.

== Career ==
Farmer served as the Deputy Speaker of the Legislative assembly from 2015 to 2017, and was appointed Minister for Child Safety, Youth and Women and Minister for the Prevention of Domestic and Family Violence on 12 December 2017 at the start of the Second Palaszczuk Ministry.

Farmer was born in Brisbane, and received a Bachelor of Speech Therapy from the University of Queensland and a Postgraduate Diploma of Administrative Studies from Kedron Park College of Advanced Education. She was a public servant and Labor Party organiser prior to her election.

== See also ==
- Third Palaszczuk Ministry

Parliament of Queensland
Preceded by Pat Purcell	Member for Bulimba; 2009–2012	Succeeded by Aaron Dillaway
Preceded by Aaron Dillaway	Member for Bulimba; 2015–present	Incumbent
