= James Dickson (Queensland politician) =

Australian politician (1832–1901)

The Honourable Sir James Dickson KCMG FRGS
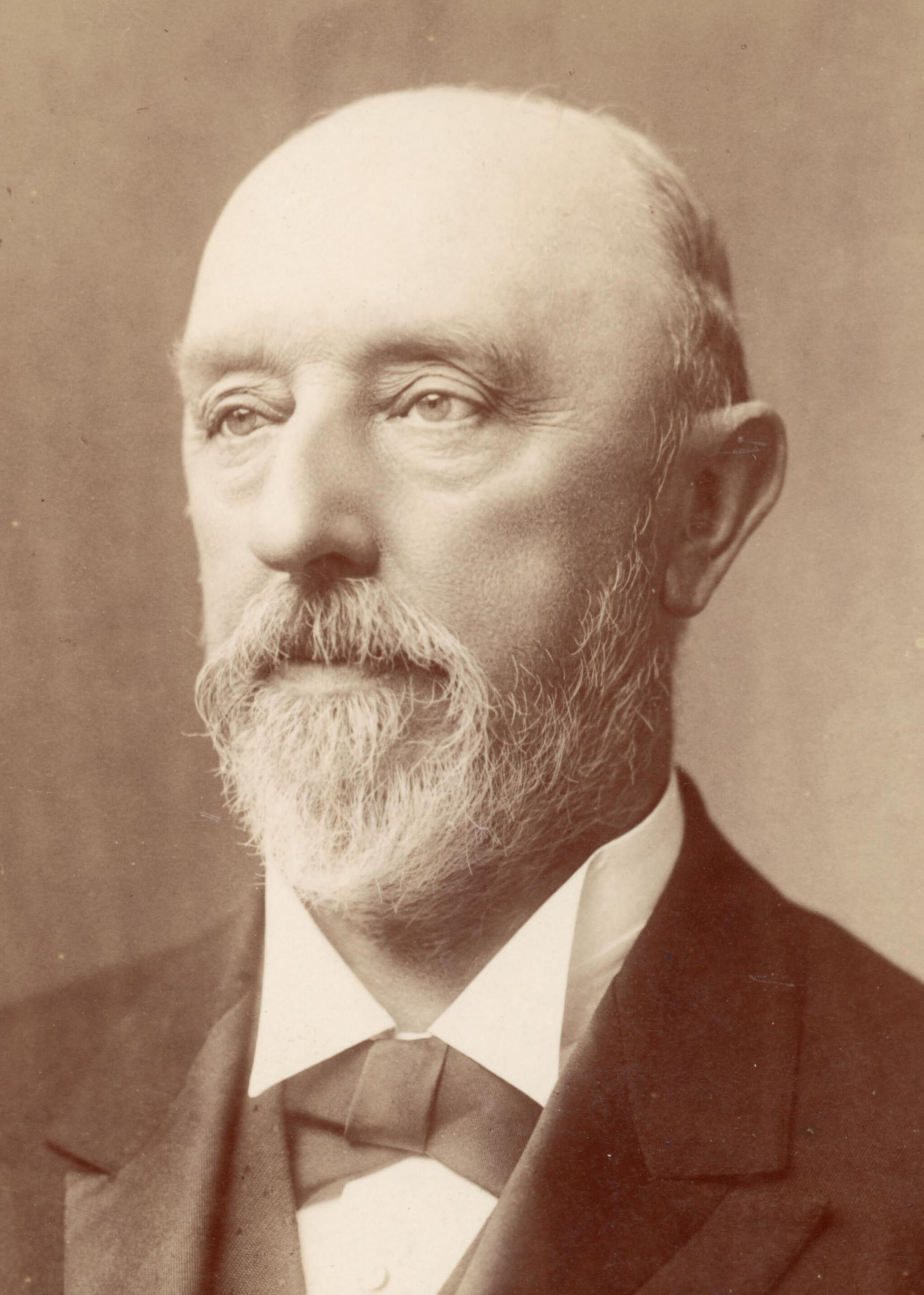

13th Premier of Queensland
- In office 1 October 1898 – 1 December 1899
- Preceded by: Thomas Joseph Byrnes
- Succeeded by: Anderson Dawson

Federal Minister for Defence
- In office 1 January 1901 – 10 January 1901
- Preceded by: None (new creation)
- Succeeded by: John Forrest

Treasurer of Queensland
- In office 5 June 1876 – 21 January 1879
- Preceded by: William Hemmant
- Succeeded by: Thomas McIlwraith
- In office 31 December 1883 – 17 August 1887
- Preceded by: James Francis Garrick
- Succeeded by: Samuel Griffith

Member of the Queensland Legislative Assembly for Enoggera
- In office 28 November 1873 – 12 May 1888 Serving with Arthur Rutledge, John Bale, Robert Bulcock
- Preceded by: New seat
- Succeeded by: James Drake

Member of the Queensland Legislative Assembly for Bulimba
- In office 16 April 1892 – 10 January 1901
- Preceded by: John Francis Buckland
- Succeeded by: Walter Barnes

Personal details
- Born: James Robert Dickson; 30 November 1832 Plymouth, Devon, England, UK
- Died: 10 January 1901 (aged 68) Sydney, Australia
- Resting place: Nundah Cemetery
- Party: Protectionist Party, Ministerialist
- Spouse(s): Annie Ely, Mary MacKinlay
- Occupation: Auctioneer, Real estate agent

Sir James Robert Dickson, KCMG FRGS (30 November 1832 – 10 January 1901) was an Australian politician and businessman, the 13th Premier of Queensland and a member of the first federal ministry.

== Early life ==
Dickson was born on 30 November 1832 in Plymouth, Devon, England. He was the only son of Mary Maria (née Palmer) and James Dickson. He was educated in Scotland at the High School of Glasgow, and subsequently worked as a junior clerk at the City of Glasgow Bank. Dickson arrived in Australia in 1854 during the Victorian gold rush. He initially worked for the Bank of Australasia and then for Rae, Dickson & Co., his cousin's merchant firm. He moved to the Colony of Queensland in 1862, working for an estate agent for a period and then establishing himself as an auctioneer and land agent. He built Toorak House, a villa overlooking the Brisbane River.

== Colonial politics ==
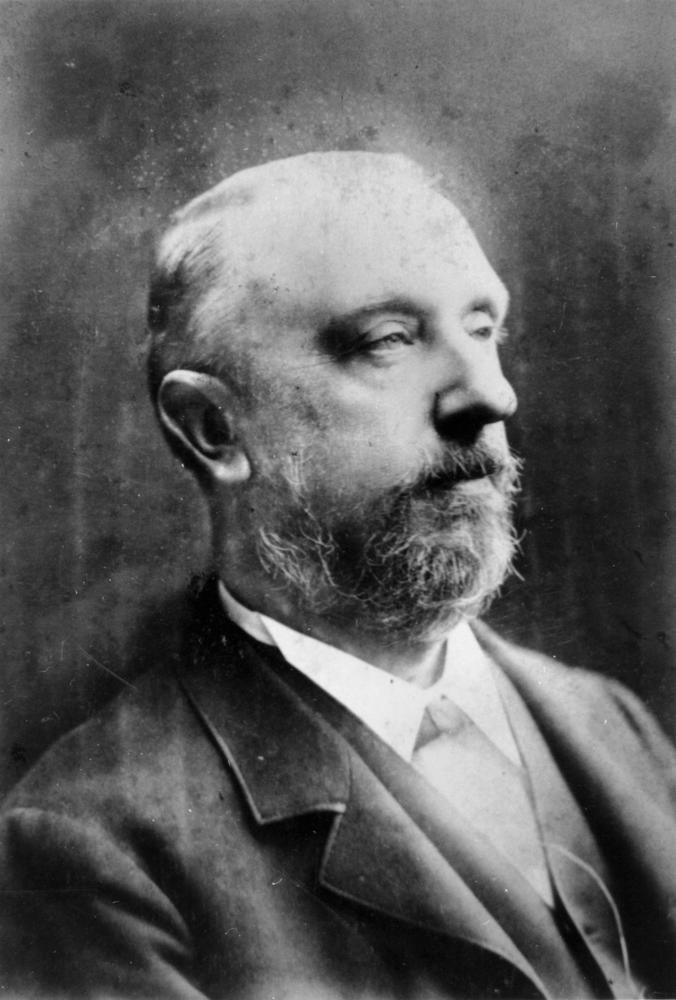
Dickson in 1883

Dickson was elected as a member of the Legislative Assembly of Queensland for Enoggera in 1873. He was made Secretary for Public Works and Mines in 1876 under Arthur Macalister, and was Treasurer 1876–79. In the absence of Sir Samuel Griffith he was briefly Opposition Leader, and was Treasurer again 1883–87 after Griffith became Premier. He lost his seat in 1888 but was again elected for Bulimba in 1892, supporting the importation of labourers from the South Pacific to work on the Queensland canefields.

In the so-called Continuous Ministry of the late 1890s, Dickson attained the positions of Secretary for Railways in 1897, Postmaster-General and Home Secretary 1898–99. In September 1898, after the death of Thomas Byrnes he was made Premier. The Continuous Ministry by this stage was falling apart, and Dickson had only a brief period in office before Anderson Dawson gained the support of the Legislative Assembly to become the leader of the world's first Labour Party government. The Ministerialists regrouped a week later to vote Dawson out of office. Dickson lacked support to become Premier again, and that position instead went to Robert Philp, in whose government Dickson was Chief Secretary.

== Federal politics and death ==
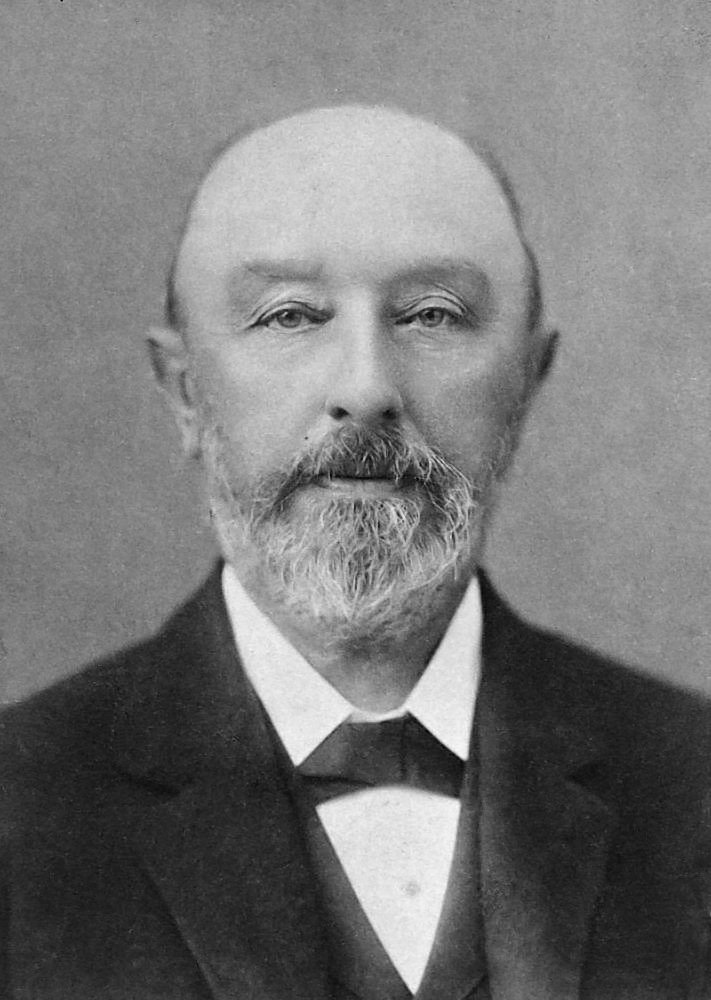
James Robert Dickson

Dickson was a leading supporter of federation in Queensland and was mainly responsible for winning a "yes" vote in the Queensland referendum on the proposed Constitution of Australia in 1900. As a result, Dickson was appointed Minister for Defence in the first federal ministry under Edmund Barton on 1 January 1901. He was intending to stand for election to the first Federal Parliament, but on 10 January he died after being taken ill at the Commonwealth's inaugural ceremonies in Sydney on 1 January. He was the first federal Minister to die in office.

He was accorded a state funeral; it proceeded from Toorak, his residence at Hamilton, to the All Saints Anglican Church. After a short service it moved on to the Nundah Cemetery.

== Honours ==
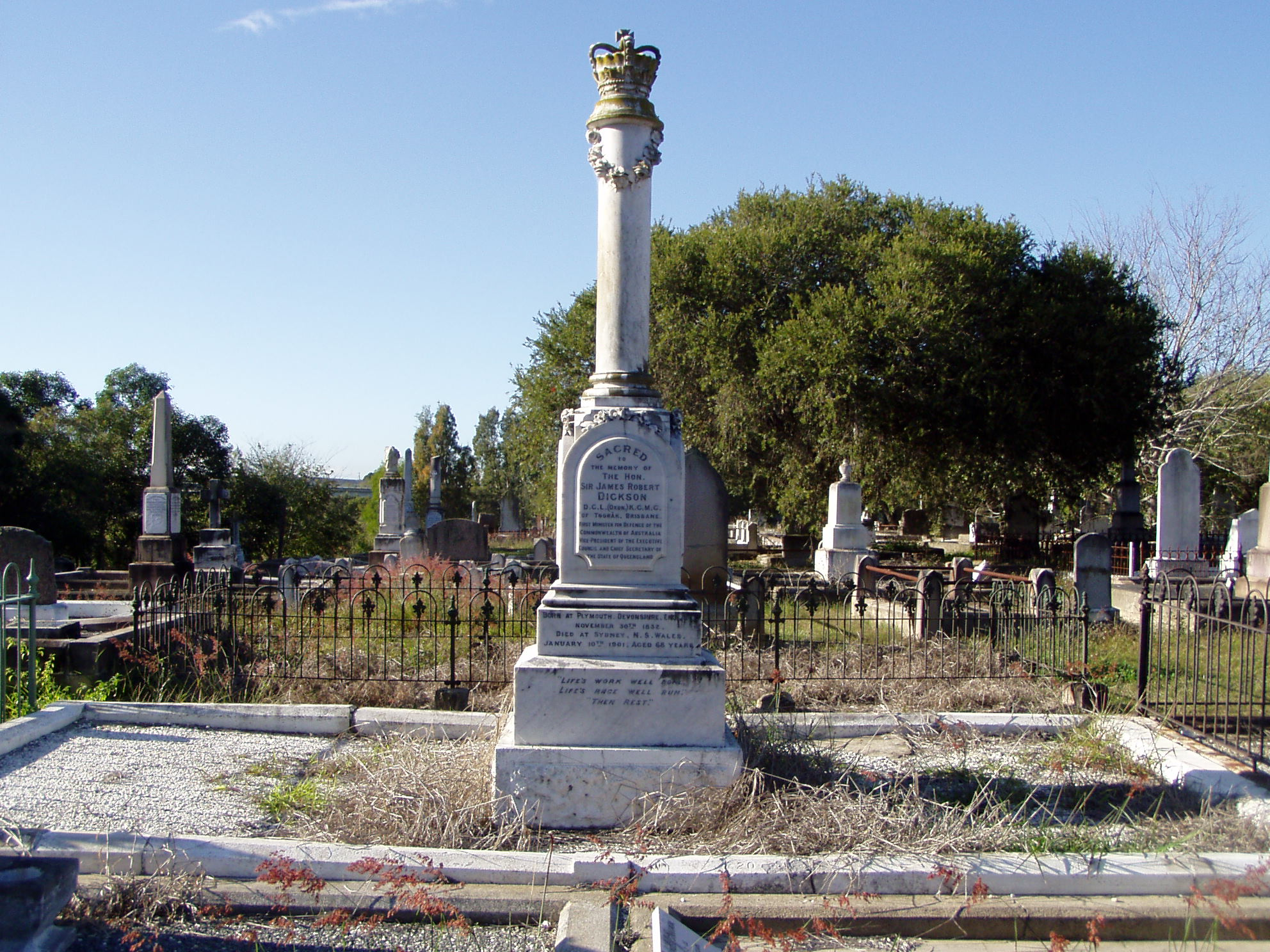
James Dickson's grave at Brisbane's Nundah Cemetery.

He was elected a Fellow of the Royal Geographical Society in November 1891. Only nine days before he died, Dickson was appointed a Knight Commander of the Order of St Michael and St George in the New Years Honours List 1 January 1901, in recognition of services in connection with the Federation of Australian Colonies and the establishment of the Commonwealth of Australia. The federal electoral division of Dickson in Queensland, and the Canberra suburb of Dickson are named after him.

Political offices
Preceded by Thomas Joseph Byrnes	Premier of Queensland; 1898–1899	Succeeded by Anderson Dawson
Preceded by New creation	Australian Minister for Defence; 1901	Succeeded by John Forrest
Parliament of Queensland
New seat	Member Enoggera; 1873–1888; Served alongside: Arthur Rutledge, John Lloyd Bale, Robert Bulcock	Succeeded by James Drake
Preceded by John Francis Buckland	Member for Bulimba; 1892–1901	Succeeded by Walter Barnes
