= Robert Bulcock =

Australian politician

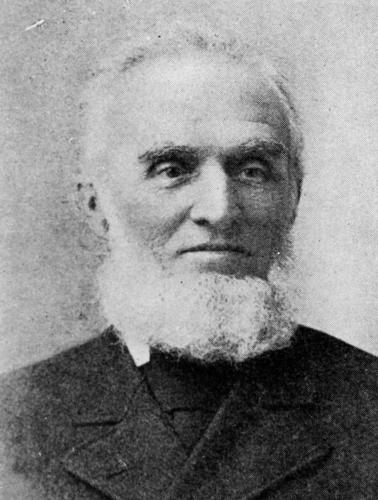

Member of the Queensland Legislative Assembly for Enoggera
- In office 26 October 1885 – 12 May 1888 Serving with James Dickson
- Preceded by: John Bale
- Succeeded by: District abolished

Member of the Queensland Legislative Council
- In office 23 August 1894 – 10 May 1900

Personal details
- Born: Robert Bulcock; 21 May 1832 Clitheroe, Lancashire, England
- Died: 10 May 1900 (aged 67) Brisbane, Queensland, Australia
- Resting place: Toowong Cemetery
- Spouse: Elizabeth Grandidge (m.1846 d.1908)
- Occupation: Farmer, editor

Robert Bulcock (21 May 1832 – 10 May 1900) was a member of both the Queensland Legislative Council and the Queensland Legislative Assembly.

== Early life ==
Bulcock was born in Clitheroe, Lancashire, to Robert Bulcock, an overlooker in a cotton factory, and his wife, Ann (née Wilkinson). His family were strict Congregationalists, a belief he followed his entire life.

Bulcock arrived in Queensland in 1855 and took up farming before becoming a seedsman and produce merchant in Queen Street, Brisbane. He was president of the Temperance Council and his strict adherence to its views made him unpopular in many quarters. In the late 1870s, Bulcock became involved in the publication of the Queensland Evangelical Standard and, although remaining involved with the temperance movement, he retired from business to enter politics.

== Political ==
In October 1885, Bulcock won the seat of Enoggera in a by-election bought on by the resignation of John Bale. He held the seat for two and a half years but did not stand for re-election at the 1888 colonial election.

Bulcock was called up to the Legislative Council in October 1894 and held the seat till his death six years later.

== Personal life ==
Before he left Clitheroe in England, Bulcock married Elizabeth Grandidge, of Shipton, Yorkshire, and together they had eleven children. Bulcock died in 1900 and was buried in Toowong Cemetery.

Bulcock was a man of strong character, and once he decided on a course of action, he would not stray from that line.

Parliament of Queensland
Preceded by John Bale	Member for Enoggera; 1885–1888; Served alongside: James Dickson	District abolished
