= Electoral district of Bulimba =

State electoral district of Queensland, Australia

Bulimba Queensland—Legislative Assembly
- Map of the electoral district of Bulimba, 2017
- State: Queensland
- Dates current: 1873–present
- MP: Di Farmer
- Party: Labor
- Namesake: Bulimba
- Electors: 39,571 (2020)
- Area: 29 km^{2} (11.2 sq mi)
- Demographic: Inner-metropolitan
- Coordinates: 27°28′S 153°5′E
Electorates around Bulimba:
McConnel	Clayfield	Clayfield
South Brisbane	Bulimba	Lytton
Greenslopes	Chatsworth	Chatsworth

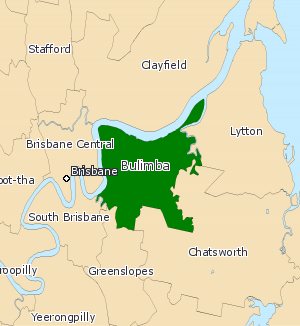
2008 map of Bulimba

Bulimba is an electoral district of the Legislative Assembly in the Australian state of Queensland.

The electorate covers the inner eastern suburbs of Brisbane. It is bounded on the north and the west by the Brisbane River and, as at the 2009 election, covers the suburbs of Bulimba, Balmoral, Cannon Hill, Hawthorne, Morningside, Norman Park, Murarrie and Seven Hills. The boundaries have changed relatively little since 1923; prior to that, the boundaries extended as far east as Wynnum and as far south-east as Mount Gravatt and Cleveland.

== History ==
Bulimba has existed continuously since the 1873 election, originally covering most of the outer south-east of Brisbane.

Since the 1923 redistribution, Bulimba has strongly supported Labor. The Labor Party (ALP) held the seat on all but six terms and, of those, 3 were held by an independent Labor candidate and one by a member of the Queensland Labor Party. As a measure of how strongly pro-Labor the seat has been, it was one of the eleven seats Labor retained in the Coalition landslide of 1974, at which Labor was cut down to a "cricket team" of only 11 members.

In the 1929 election Bulimba returned Queensland's first woman Member of the Queensland Legislative Assembly (MLA), Irene Longman of the Country and Progressive National Party, for one term.

Although ALP candidate Robert Gardner was elected in Bulimba in the 1950 election, the close result caused close scrutiny of the votes and revealed that fraudulent votes had been cast in Gardner's favour. The election was ruled void, but Gardner himself was cleared of any involvement in the fraud. The scandal and the investigations into the fraud continued for many months. Finally, a by-election was held on 14 April 1951 (almost 12 months after the original election) with the ballot boxes under police guard. Gardner won the by-election by a narrow margin.

Prior to the 1957 election, Gardner and 21 other Labor MLAs under the leadership of Premier Vince Gair left the ALP to form the Queensland Labor Party (QLP). Gardner was defeated by Jack Houston of the regular ALP, who held the seat until 1980 and was the state's Opposition Leader from 1966 until 1974.

In the 2012 election, Liberal National candidate Aaron Dillaway was elected. In the 2015 election, Bulimba was the most marginal seat held by the LNP and was regained by Di Farmer of the ALP.

== Members for Bulimba ==
Member	Party	Term
William Hemmant		1873–1876
James Johnston		1876
George Grimes		1876–1878
Frederick Swanwick		1878–1882
John Francis Buckland	Liberal	1882–1892
James Dickson	Independent	1892–1896
James Dickson	Ministerial	1896–1901
Walter Barnes	Ministerial	1901–1903
Walter Barnes	Conservative	1903–1909
Walter Barnes	Liberal	1909–1915
Hugh McMinn	Labor	1915–1918
Walter Barnes	National	1918–1922
Walter Barnes	United	1922–1923
Harry Wright	Labor	1923–1929
Irene Longman	Country and Progressive National	1929–1932
William Copley	Labor	1932–1938
George Marriott	Labor	1938–1941
George Marriott	Independent Labor	1941–1950
Bob Gardner	Labor	1950–1957
Bob Gardner	Queensland Labor	1957
Jack Houston	Labor	1957–1980
Ron McLean	Labor	1980–1992
Pat Purcell	Labor	1992–2009
Di Farmer	Labor	2009–2012
Aaron Dillaway	Liberal National	2012–2015
Di Farmer	Labor	2015–present

== Election results ==
2024 Queensland state election: Bulimba
Party	Candidate	Votes	%	±%
Labor	Di Farmer	15,560	42.11	−6.12
Liberal National	Laura Wong	13,469	36.45	+2.26
Greens	Linda Barry	6,095	16.50	+3.08
One Nation	Jonathon Andrade	1126	3.05	+0.79
Independent	Matthew Bellina	698	1.89	+1.89
Total formal votes		36,948	97.68	−0.42
Informal votes		876	2.32	+0.42
Turnout		37,824	90.21	+0.68
Two-party-preferred result
Labor	Di Farmer	21,486	58.15	−3.24
Liberal National	Laura Wong	15,462	41.85	+3.24
Labor hold		Swing	-3.24	
