= Electoral results for the district of Barcoo =

Queensland, Australia, district election results

This is a list of electoral results for the electoral district of Barcoo in Queensland state elections.

== Members for Barcoo ==
Member	Party	Term
Frank Reid Murphy		1885–1892
Tommy Ryan	Labour	1892–1893
George Kerr	Ministerialist	1893–1909
T. J. Ryan	Labor	1909–1919
Frank Bulcock	Labor	1919–1942
Ned Davis	Labor	1943–1961
Eugene O'Donnell	Labor	1961–1972

== Election results ==
=== Elections in the 1960s ===
1969 Queensland state election: Barcoo
Party	Candidate	Votes	%	±%
Labor	Eugene O'Donnell	4,593	57.5	−1.5
Country	Harold Braun	2,980	37.3	+2.2
Queensland Labor	Edwin Eshmann	419	5.2	−0.7
Total formal votes		7,911	99.0	+0.4
Informal votes		81	1.0	−0.4
Turnout		7,992	91.2	−1.0
Two-party-preferred result
Labor	Eugene O'Donnell	4,671	58.4	−1.7
Country	Harold Braun	3,321	41.6	+1.7
Labor hold		Swing	−1.7	

1966 Queensland state election: Barcoo
Party	Candidate	Votes	%	±%
Labor	Eugene O'Donnell	4,575	59.0	−5.2
Country	Michael Cronin	2,721	35.1	−0.7
Queensland Labor	Edward Eshmann	457	5.9	+5.9
Total formal votes		7,693	98.6	−0.3
Informal votes		166	1.4	+0.3
Turnout		7,859	92.2	−0.9
Two-party-preferred result
Labor	Eugene O'Donnell	4,660	60.1	−4.1
Country	Michael Cronin	3,093	39.9	+4.1
Labor hold		Swing	−4.1	

1963 Queensland state election: Barcoo
Party	Candidate	Votes	%	±%
Labor	Eugene O'Donnell	5,142	64.2	+17.4
Country	Gordon Vandersee	2,868	35.8	−0.3
Total formal votes		8,010	98.9	−0.4
Informal votes		87	1.1	+0.4
Turnout		8,097	93.1	+1.3
Labor hold		Swing	N/A	

1961 Barcoo state by-election
Party	Candidate	Votes	%	±%
Labor	Eugene O'Donnell	4,355	60.7	+13.9
Queensland Labor	Gordon Vandersee	2,819	39.3	+22.3
Total formal votes		7,174	99.6	+0.3
Informal votes		26	0.4	−0.3
Turnout		7,200	84.4	−7.4
Labor hold		Swing	N/A	

1960 Queensland state election: Barcoo
Party	Candidate	Votes	%	±%
Labor	Edward Davis	3,676	46.8	
Country	Fred Gowland	2,835	36.1	
Queensland Labor	Tom Foley	1,337	17.0	
Total formal votes		7,848	99.3	
Informal votes		52	0.7	
Turnout		7,900	91.8	
Labor hold		Swing		

=== Elections in the 1950s ===
1957 Queensland state election: Barcoo
Party	Candidate	Votes	%	±%
Labor	Edward Davis	1,971	40.8	−26.8
Queensland Labor	Stanley Barry	1,443	29.9	+29.9
Country	Raymond Paynter	1,419	29.4	−3.0
Total formal votes		4,833	99.4	+0.6
Informal votes		31	0.6	−0.6
Turnout		4,864	91.3	+3.9
Labor hold		Swing	−9.8	

1956 Queensland state election: Barcoo
Party	Candidate	Votes	%	±%
Labor	Edward Davis	3,008	67.6	−32.4
Country	Wally Rae	1,444	32.4	+32.4
Total formal votes		4,452	98.8	
Informal votes		55	1.2	
Turnout		4,507	87.4	
Labor hold		Swing	N/A	

1953 Queensland state election: Barcoo
Party	Candidate	Votes	%	±%
Labor	Edward Davis	unopposed		
Labor hold		Swing		

1950 Queensland state election: Barcoo
Party	Candidate	Votes	%	±%
Labor	Edward Davis	2,828	68.5	
Country	Arthur Chresby	1,300	31.5	
Total formal votes		4,128	99.1	
Informal votes		38	0.9	
Turnout		4,166	88.6	
Labor hold		Swing		

=== Elections in the 1940s ===
1947 Queensland state election: Barcoo
Party	Candidate	Votes	%	±%
Labor	Edward Davis	4,137	66.7	−33.3
People's Party	James Keehan	1,740	28.1	+28.1
Frank Barnes Labor	Reginald Parnell	323	5.2	+5.2
Total formal votes		6,200	97.9	
Informal votes		134	2.1	
Turnout		6,334	88.8	
Labor hold		Swing	N/A	

1944 Queensland state election: Barcoo
Party	Candidate	Votes	%	±%
Labor	Edward Davis	unopposed		
Labor hold		Swing		

1943 Barcoo state by-election
Party	Candidate	Votes	%	±%
Labor	Edward Davis	3,686	67.6	−12.0
Free Labor	J. Howe	1,062	19.5	+19.5
Independent	O.P.J. O'Beirne	704	12.9	+12.9
Total formal votes		5,452	98.7	+1.6
Informal votes		70	1.3	−1.6
Turnout		5,522		
Labor hold		Swing	N/A	

1941 Queensland state election: Barcoo
Party	Candidate	Votes	%	±%
Labor	Frank Bulcock	4,809	79.6	−20.4
Country	Robert McGeoch	1,229	20.4	+20.4
Total formal votes		6,038	97.1	
Informal votes		181	2.9	
Turnout		6,219	80.2	
Labor hold		Swing	N/A	

=== Elections in the 1930s ===
1938 Queensland state election: Barcoo
Party	Candidate	Votes	%	±%
Labor	Frank Bulcock	unopposed		
Labor hold		Swing		

1935 Queensland state election: Barcoo
Party	Candidate	Votes	%	±%
Labor	Frank Bulcock	unopposed		
Labor hold		Swing		

1932 Queensland state election: Barcoo
Party	Candidate	Votes	%	±%
Labor	Frank Bulcock	unopposed		
Labor hold		Swing		

=== Elections in the 1920s ===
1929 Queensland state election: Barcoo
Party	Candidate	Votes	%	±%
Labor	Frank Bulcock	unopposed		
Labor hold		Swing		

1926 Queensland state election: Barcoo
Party	Candidate	Votes	%	±%
Labor	Frank Bulcock	unopposed		
Labor hold		Swing		

1923 Queensland state election: Barcoo
Party	Candidate	Votes	%	±%
Labor	Frank Bulcock	unopposed		
Labor hold		Swing		

1920 Queensland state election: Barcoo
Party	Candidate	Votes	%	±%
Labor	Frank Bulcock	2,628	70.4	−3.4
Northern Country	James Cullen	1,105	29.6	+29.6
Total formal votes		3,733	99.0	+0.2
Informal votes		37	1.0	−0.2
Turnout		3,770	71.5	−1.6
Labor hold		Swing	−3.4	

=== Elections in the 1910s ===
1919 Barcoo state by-election
Party	Candidate	Votes	%	±%
Labor	Frank Bulcock	1,632	74.7	+0.9
Primary Producers	John Boland	552	25.3	+25.3
Total formal votes		2,184	98.8	0.0
Informal votes		26	1.2	0.0
Turnout		2,210		
Labor hold		Swing	+0.9	

1918 Queensland state election: Barcoo
Party	Candidate	Votes	%	±%
Labor	T. J. Ryan	2,548	73.8	−3.6
National	Henry Buchanan	907	26.2	+3.6
Total formal votes		3,455	98.8	+1.5
Informal votes		43	1.2	−1.5
Turnout		3,498	73.1	+0.8
Labor hold		Swing	−3.6	

1915 Queensland state election: Barcoo
Party	Candidate	Votes	%	±%
Labor	T.J. Ryan	1,962	77.4	+5.1
Liberal	Charles Webster	573	22.6	−5.1
Total formal votes		2,535	97.3	−1.1
Informal votes		69	2.7	+1.1
Turnout		2,604	72.3	+7.0
Labor hold		Swing	+5.1	

1912 Queensland state election: Barcoo
Party	Candidate	Votes	%	±%
Labor	T.J. Ryan	1,649	72.3	
Liberal	Albert Catchlove	633	27.7	
Total formal votes		2,282	98.4	
Informal votes		38	1.6	
Turnout		2,320	65.3	
Labor hold		Swing		
