= William Campbell =

William, Willy, Will, Billy, or Bill Campbell may refer to:

== Government officials ==
=== Canada ===
- William Campbell (judge) (1758–1834), Scottish-born Chief Justice of the Supreme Court of Upper Canada
- William Campbell (Canadian politician) (born 1929), Canadian House of Commons, 1979–1980
- William Campbell (Prince Edward Island politician) (1836–1909), farmer and political figure
- William A. Campbell (politician) (1873–1934), Alberta provincial politician
- William Bennett Campbell (1943–2008), premier of Prince Edward Island
- Bill Campbell (Nova Scotia politician) (1919–2003), Canadian politician in the Nova Scotia House of Assembly
- William Neil Campbell (1885–1979), Canadian politician
- William Campbell (Canadian mayor) (1742–1823), mayor of Saint John, New Brunswick

=== United States ===
- William Campbell (California politician) (1935–2015), state legislator in California
- William Campbell (surveyor) (c. 1767 – 1844), American physician and politician from New York, of Cherry Valley, Otsego County
- William B. Campbell (1807–1867), governor of Tennessee
- William James Campbell (1850–1896), American politician (23rd Lieutenant Governor of Illinois)
- William Joseph Campbell (1905–1988), U.S. federal judge
- William Joseph Campbell (meteorologist) (1930–1992), American meteorologist
- William L. Campbell Jr. (born 1969), U.S. federal judge
- William W. Campbell (New York congressman) (1806–1881), U.S. congressman from New York
- William Whitmore Campbell (1870–1934), American lawyer and politician from New York
- William Wildman Campbell (1853–1927), U.S. Representative from Ohio
- Bill Campbell (California politician) (born 1942), Republican politician from California
- Bill Campbell (mayor) (born 1953/1954), former mayor of Atlanta, Georgia
- William Douglas Campbell, lobbyist and FBI informant in 2017

=== Australia ===
- William Campbell (Victorian politician) (1810–1896), pastoralist and member of the Victorian Legislative Council
- William Campbell (New South Wales politician) (1838–1906)
- William Henry Campbell (Queensland politician) (1846–1919), Queensland politician and newspaper editor/proprietor
- Bill Campbell (Victorian politician) (1920–1996)

=== Other countries ===
- Lord William Campbell (c. 1731 – 1778), Scottish-born royal governor of Nova Scotia and South Carolina
- William Campbell (British Army officer, died 1796) (died 1796), governor of Bermuda in 1796
- William Campbell, 2nd Baron Stratheden and Campbell (1824–1893), British peer and Liberal politician
- George William Robert Campbell (1835–1905), British colonial Inspector General of Police of Ceylon (Sri Lanka)
- William Campbell, Lord Skerrington (1855–1927), Scottish judge
- William Campbell (MP) (died 1787), British Army officer and politician, MP for Glasgow
- William Telfer Campbell (1863–1929), British colonial administrator

== Sports ==
=== American football ===
- Bill Campbell (gridiron football) (1920–1974)
- Will Campbell (offensive lineman) (born 2004), offensive tackle
- William Campbell (gridiron football) (born 1991), offensive tackle

=== Association football ===
- William Campbell (footballer) (1865–?), Scottish forward with various clubs including Preston North End, Darwen and Newton Heath
- Willie Campbell (footballer) (c. 1900–?), Scottish footballer
- Billy Campbell (footballer, born 1920) (1920–1994), Scotland international footballer (Greenock Morton FC)
- Billy Campbell (Northern Irish footballer) (1944–2026), Northern Ireland international footballer (Sunderland AFC, Dundee FC, Motherwell FC)
- William Cole Campbell (born 2006), Icelandic footballer (FH, Breiðablik, Borussia Dortmund)

=== Australian rules football ===
- Bill Campbell (footballer, born 1883) (1883–1954), player for Fitzroy
- Bill Campbell (footballer, born 1904) (1904–2007), player for North Melbourne

=== Baseball ===
- Bill Campbell (baseball) (1948–2023), right-handed pitcher in MLB from 1973 to 1987
- Billy Campbell (baseball) (1873–1957), left-handed pitcher in MLB from 1905 to 1909
- Bullet Campbell (William Henry Campbell, 1896–1968), American Negro leagues pitcher

=== Golf ===
- William C. Campbell (golfer) (1923–2013), president of the United States Golf Association
- Willie Campbell (golfer) (1862–1900), Scottish golfer

=== Other sports ===
- William Campbell (sport shooter) (1919–1986), Irish Olympic sport shooter
- Bill Campbell (rugby union) (born 1961), Australian vascular surgeon and former Wallabies rugby player
- Willie Campbell (hurler) (1918–1978), Irish hurler
- Bill Campbell (sportscaster) (1923–2014), sportscaster in the Philadelphia area
- William Campbell (bowls) (1878–1939), Scottish lawn bowler

== Military figures ==
- William Campbell (general) (1745–1781), Virginia militia general in the American Revolution
- William Campbell (Medal of Honor, 1838) (1838–?), American Civil War sailor and Medal of Honor recipient
- William Campbell (Medal of Honor, 1840) (1840–1919), American Civil War soldier and Medal of Honor recipient
- William A. Campbell (Tuskegee Airman) (1917–2012), African American pilot
- William Charles Campbell (1889–1958), World War I fighter pilot
- William Hunter Campbell (1839–1862), Ohio civilian who worked for the Union Army during the American Civil War
- William Pitcairn Campbell (1856–1933), British Army general during World War I
- William J. Campbell (general) (1931–2017), American Air Force general
- William Edward Campbell, better known as William March (1893–1954), American soldier and novelist

== Arts and entertainment ==
=== Actors ===
- William Campbell (actor) (1923–2011), American film and television actor
- Billy Gilbert (silent film actor) (William V. Campbell, 1891–1961), American silent film actor
- Billy Campbell (born 1959), American actor sometimes referred to as William Oliver Campbell or Bill Campbell

=== Musicians ===
- Junior Campbell (William Campbell, born 1947), musician and composer
- William Campbell (Scottish musician) (fl 1990s), Scottish musician

=== Producers and directors ===
- Billy Campbell (TV executive) (born 1959), American TV producer
- William Campbell (filmmaker), producer, documentary filmmaker, and photojournalist
- William S. Campbell (1884–1972), film director

=== Other people in arts and entertainment ===
- William L. Campbell (1946–2005), film editor of Storm 1987
- William M. Campbell, president of Discovery Networks U.S.
- Bill Campbell (illustrator) (1920–2017), American illustrator for the Hawk Model Company
- Big Bill Campbell (1891–1952), Canadian entertainer and broadcaster
- William Wilfred Campbell (1858–1918), Canadian poet

== Religious figures ==
- William Campbell (minister) (died 1805), Irish minister
- William Howard Campbell (1859–1910), Irish missionary in southern India
- William Campbell (London Missionary Society) (1799–1878), LMS missionary in southern India
- William Campbell (missionary) (1841–1921), Presbyterian missionary to Taiwan
- William Rickarby Campbell (1840–1918), New Zealand Presbyterian minister
- Will Campbell (Baptist minister) (1924–2013), American Baptist minister

== Scientists and engineers ==
- William Campbell (metallographer) (1876–1936), English metallurgist
- William C. Campbell (scientist) (born 1930), Irish biochemist and a Nobel laureate
- William Wallace Campbell (1862–1938), American astronomer

== Business and economics ==
- William Campbell of Tullichewan (1793–1864), Glasgow businessman and councillor
- Bill Campbell (business executive) (1940–2016), CEO of Intuit
- William Middleton Campbell (1849–1919), Governor of the Bank of England

== Other people ==
- Bill Ransom Campbell (1920–1996), academic architect from North Carolina
- William D. Campbell (Scouting) (1907–1995), world Scouting leader
- William Henry Campbell (college president) (1808–1890), president of Rutgers College, 1862–1882
- William Hinton Campbell (1819–1855), English architect
- William Wellesley Campbell (?–1962), Guyanese physician and monk
- William Campbell, alleged Paul McCartney look-alike who, according to the urban legend and conspiracy theory "Paul is dead", replaced him in the Beatles

== Fictional characters ==
- Billy Campbell, in the American TV soap opera Melrose Place, played by Andrew Shue
