= Electoral results for the district of Belyando =

Queensland, Australia, district election results

This is a list of electoral results for the electoral district of Belyando in Queensland state elections.

== Members for Belyando ==
First incarnation (1950–1960)
Member	Party	Term
Tom Foley	Labor	1950–1957
Tom Foley	Queensland Labor	1957–1960
Second incarnation (1972–1977)
Eugene O'Donnell	Labor	1972–1974
Vince Lester	National	1974–1977

== Election results ==
=== Elections in the 1970s ===
1974 Queensland state election: Belyando
Party	Candidate	Votes	%	±%
National	Vince Lester	5,379	50.2	+1.5
Labor	James Turner	4,436	41.4	−9.9
Liberal	Fred Cowdray	900	8.4	+8.4
Total formal votes		10,715	98.5	−0.1
Informal votes		165	1.5	+0.1
Turnout		10,880	87.8	−1.9
Two-party-preferred result
National	Vince Lester	6,153	57.4	+8.7
Labor	James Turner	4,562	42.6	−8.7
National gain from Labor		Swing	+8.7	

1972 Queensland state election: Belyando
Party	Candidate	Votes	%	±%
Labor	Eugene O'Donnell	4,213	51.3	−1.1
Country	Vince Lester	4,003	48.7	+1.1
Total formal votes		8,216	98.6	
Informal votes		116	1.4	
Turnout		8,332	89.7	
Labor hold		Swing	−1.1	

=== Elections in the 1950s ===
1957 Queensland state election: Belyando
Party	Candidate	Votes	%	±%
Queensland Labor	Tom Foley	1,841	38.6	+38.6
Country	Clarence Whyte	1,774	37.1	−4.2
Labor	John Williams	1,161	24.3	−34.4
Total formal votes		4,776	99.2	
Informal votes		39	0.8	
Turnout		4,815	91.9	
Queensland Labor gain from Labor		Swing	N/A	

1956 Queensland state election: Belyando
Party	Candidate	Votes	%	±%
Labor	Tom Foley	2,512	58.7	−41.3
Country	Timothy Donnelly	1,770	41.3	+41.3
Total formal votes		4,282	99.2	
Informal votes		33	0.8	
Turnout		4,315	85.9	
Labor hold		Swing	N/A	

1953 Queensland state election: Belyando
Party	Candidate	Votes	%	±%
Labor	Tom Foley	unopposed		
Labor hold		Swing		

1950 Queensland state election: Belyando
Party	Candidate	Votes	%	±%
Labor	Tom Foley	2,619	58.9	
Country	Reg Colwell	1,826	41.1	
Total formal votes		4,445	99.2	
Informal votes		34	0.8	
Turnout		4,479	90.9	
Labor hold		Swing		
