= Abbey School =

Abbey School or The Abbey School may refer to:

- The Abbey School, Faversham
- Abbey Christian Brothers' Grammar School, a Christian Brothers Grammar School in Newry, County Down
- Abbey College, Ramsey
- The Abbey School, Reading
- Abbey School, Rotherham
- The Abbey School (Tipperary), a Christian Brothers Secondary School in County Tipperary, Ireland
- Abbey School, Trinidad and Tobago
- Abbey Vocational School, a non-denominational vocational secondary school in County Donegal

== See also ==
- Abbey Theatre School
