= National Board of Review: Top Five Documentary Films =

Top Five Documentary Films
- Awarded for: Excellence in documentary filmmaking
- Country: United States
- Presented by: National Board of Review
- First award: 2003

The following is a list of the Top Five Documentary Films chosen annually by the National Board of Review, beginning in 2003.

== Notes ==
- † Academy Award for Best Documentary Feature winner
- ≠ Academy Award for Best Documentary Feature nominee
- ‡ Writers Guild of America Award for Best Documentary Screenplay winner
- # Writers Guild of America Award for Best Documentary Screenplay nominee
- √ Producers Guild of America Award for Best Documentary Motion Picture winner
- ≈ Producers Guild of America Award for Best Documentary Motion Picture nominee

== Top Five Documentary Films ==
=== 2000s ===
Year	Film	Director(s)	Ref.
2003	Capturing the Friedmans ≠	Andrew Jarecki	
2003	The Fog of War †	Errol Morris	
2003	My Architect ≠	Nathaniel Kahn	
2003	Spellbound	Jeffrey Blitz	
2003	Winged Migration	Jacques Cluzaud, Michel Debats and Jacques Perrin	
2004	Born into Brothels †	Zana Briski and Ross Kauffman	
2004	Paper Clips	Joe Fab	
2004	Super Size Me ≠ ‡	Morgan Spurlock	
2004	The Story of the Weeping Camel ≠	Byambasuren Davaa and Luigi Falorni	
2004	Z Channel: A Magnificent Obsession	Alexandra Cassavetes	
2005	Ballets Russes	Dayna Goldfine and Dan Geller	
2005	Grizzly Man	Werner Herzog	
2005	Mad Hot Ballroom	Marilyn Agrelo	
2005	March of the Penguins † #	Luc Jacquet and Yves Darondeau	
2005	Murderball ≠	Henry Alex Rubin and Dana Adam Shapiro	
2006	51 Birch Street	Doug Block	
2006	An Inconvenient Truth †	Davis Guggenheim	
2006	Iraq in Fragments ≠	James Longley	
2006	Shut Up & Sing	Barbara Kopple and Cecilia Peck	
2006	Wordplay	Patrick Creadon	
2007	Darfur Now	Ted Braun	
2007	In the Shadow of the Moon	David Sington	
2007	Nanking #	Bill Guttentag and Dan Sturman	
2007	Taxi to the Dark Side †‡	Alex Gibney	
2007	Toots	Kristi Jacobson	
2008	American Teen	Nanette Burstein	
2008	The Betrayal – Nerakhoon ≠	Ellen Kuras and Thavisouk Phrasavath	
2008	Dear Zachary	Kurt Kuenne	
2008	Encounters at the End of the World ≠	Werner Herzog	
2008	Roman Polanski: Wanted and Desired	Marina Zenovich	
2009	Burma VJ: Reporting from a Closed Country ≠ ≈	Anders Østergaard	
2009	Crude	Joe Berlinger	
2009	Food, Inc. ≠	Robert Kenner	
2009	Good Hair #	Jeff Stilson	
2009	The Most Dangerous Man in America ≠	Judith Ehrlich and Rick Goldsmith	

=== 2010s ===
Year	Film	Director(s)	Ref.
2010	A Film Unfinished	Yael Hersonski	
2010	Inside Job †‡	Charles Ferguson	
2010	Joan Rivers: A Piece of Work	Ricki Stern and Anne Sundberg	
2010	Restrepo ≠	Tim Hetherington and Sebastian Junger	
2010	The Tillman Story	Amir Bar-Lev	
2011	Born to Be Wild	David Lickley	
2011	Buck	Cindy Meehl	
2011	George Harrison: Living in the Material World	Martin Scorsese	
2011	Project Nim	James Marsh	
2011	Senna #	Asif Kapadia	
2012	Ai Weiwei: Never Sorry	Alison Klayman	
2012	Detropia	Heidi Ewing and Rachel Grady	
2012	The Gatekeepers ≠	Dror Moreh	
2012	The Invisible War ≠ #	Kirby Dick	
2012	Only the Young	Jason Tippet and Elizabeth Mims	
2013	20 Feet from Stardom †	Morgan Neville	
2013	The Act of Killing ≠	Joshua Oppenheimer	
2013	After Tiller	Martha Shane and Lana Wilson	
2013	Casting By	Tom Donahue	
2013	The Square ≠	Jehane Noujaim	
2014	Art and Craft	Sam Cullman and Jennifer Grausman	
2014	Jodorowsky's Dune	Frank Pavich	
2014	Keep on Keepin' On	Alan Hicks	
2014	The Kill Team	Dan Krauss	
2014	Last Days in Vietnam ≠ #	Rory Kennedy	
2015	Best of Enemies	Robert Gordon and Morgan Neville	
2015	The Black Panthers: Vanguard of the Revolution	Stanley Nelson Jr.	
2015	The Diplomat	David Holbrooke	
2015	Listen to Me Marlon	Stevan Riley	
2015	The Look of Silence ≠ ≈	Joshua Oppenheimer	
2016	De Palma	Noah Baumbach and Jake Paltrow	
2016	The Eagle Huntress	Otto Bell	
2016	Gleason	Clay Tweel	
2016	Life, Animated ≠	Roger Ross Williams	
2016	Miss Sharon Jones!	Barbara Kopple	
2017	Abacus: Small Enough to Jail ≠	Steve James	
2017	Brimstone & Glory	Viktor Jakovleski	
2017	Eric Clapton: Life in 12 Bars	Lili Fini Zanuck	
2017	Faces Places ≠	Agnès Varda and JR	
2017	Hell On Earth: The Fall of Syria and the Rise of ISIS	Mohammed Jambaz, Sebastian Junger, and Nick Quested	
2018	Crime + Punishment	Stephen Maing	
2018	Free Solo † ≈	Elizabeth Chai Vasarhelyi and Jimmy Chin	
2018	Minding the Gap ≠	Bing Liu	
2018	Three Identical Strangers ≈	Tim Wardle	
2018	Won't You Be My Neighbor? √	Morgan Neville	
2019	American Factory † ≈	Steven Bognar and Julia Reichert	
2019	Apollo 11 √	Todd Douglas Miller	
2019	The Black Godfather	Reginald Hudlin	
2019	Rolling Thunder Revue: A Bob Dylan Story by Martin Scorsese	Martin Scorsese	
2019	Wrestle	Suzannah Herbert and Lauren Belfer	

=== 2020s ===
Year	Film	Director(s)	Ref.
2020	All In: The Fight for Democracy #	Liz Garbus and Lisa Cortés	
2020	Boys State	Jesse Moss and Amanda McBaine	
2020	Dick Johnson Is Dead ≈	Kirsten Johnson	
2020	Miss Americana	Lana Wilson	
2020	The Truffle Hunters ≈	Michael Dweck and Gregory Kershaw	
2021	Ascension ≠ ≈	Jessica Kingdon	
2021	Attica ≠	Traci Cury and Stanley Nelson Jr.	
2021	Flee ≠ ≈	Jonas Poher Rasmussen	
2021	The Rescue ≈	Elizabeth Chai Vasarhelyi and Jimmy Chin	
2021	Roadrunner: A Film About Anthony Bourdain	Morgan Neville	
2022	All the Beauty and the Bloodshed ≠	Laura Poitras	
2022	All That Breathes ≠ ≈	Shaunak Sen	
2022	Descendant ≈	Margaret Brown	
2022	Turn Every Page	Lizzie Gottlieb	
2022	Wildcat	Trevor Frost and Melissa Lesh	
2023	20 Days in Mariupol † ≈	Mstyslav Chernov	
2023	32 Sounds	Sam Green	
2023	The Eternal Memory ≠	Maite Alberdi	
2023	The Pigeon Tunnel ‡	Errol Morris	
2023	A Still Small Voice	Luke Lorentzen	
2024	Black Box Diaries ≠	Shiori Itō	
2024	Dahomey	Mati Diop	
2024	Look into My Eyes	Lana Wilson	
2024	Super/Man: The Christopher Reeve Story √	Ian Bonhôte and Peter Ettedgui	
2024	Will & Harper	Josh Greenbaum	
2025	2000 Meters to Andriivka	Mstyslav Chernov	
2025	Come See Me in the Good Light	Ryan White	
2025	My Mom Jayne	Mariska Hargitay	
2025	Natchez	Suzannah Herbert	
2025	Orwell: 2+2=5	Raoul Peck	
