= Paper clip (disambiguation) =

A paper clip is a paper fastener.

Paper clip may also refer to:

- "Paper Clip", an episode of The X-Files
- Paper Clips Project, a monument honoring the Holocaust victims
  - Paper Clips (film), a 2004 documentary about the project
- PaperClip, a 1980s word processor for the Commodore 64 and Atari 8-bit computers
- Microsoft Paperclip, the default Microsoft Office Assistant
- Operation Paperclip, codename for the U.S. intelligence plan to extract scientists from Germany during World War II
- Queensland Raceway, a racing circuit located at Willowbank in Ipswich, Queensland, Australia

== See also ==
- One red paperclip, trading experiment
- Paperclip maximizer, Nick Bostrom's thought experiment about existential risk of artificial intelligence
- Universal Paperclips, a 2017 incremental game using the concept of the paperclip maximizer
