= William J. Campbell =

William J. Campbell may refer to:

- William James Campbell (1850–1896), state senator and Lieutenant Governor of Illinois
- William Joseph Campbell (1905–1988), U.S. federal judge from Illinois
- Bill Campbell (California politician) (born 1942), Republican politician from California
- William John Campbell, mayor of Freetown, Sierra Leone
- William J. Campbell (general) (1931–2017), American Air Force general
- William Joseph Campbell (meteorologist) (1930–1992), American meteorologist

== See also ==
- William Campbell (disambiguation)
