= Electoral results for the district of Peak Downs =

Queensland, Australia, district election results

This is a list of electoral results for the electoral district of Peak Downs in Queensland state elections.

== Members for Peak Downs ==
Member	Party	Term
Vince Lester	National	1977–1992

1989 Queensland state election: Peak Downs
Party	Candidate	Votes	%	±%
National	Vince Lester	4,232	50.6	−14.0
Labor	Paul Bell	3,160	37.8	+7.3
Citizens Electoral Council	Robert Reinke	971	11.6	+11.6
Total formal votes		8,363	98.6	−0.1
Informal votes		122	1.4	+0.1
Turnout		8,485	91.3	+0.7
Two-party-preferred result
National	Vince Lester	4,976	59.5	−7.5
Labor	Paul Bell	3,387	40.5	+7.5
National hold		Swing	−7.5	

1986 Queensland state election: Peak Downs
Party	Candidate	Votes	%	±%
National	Vince Lester	4,994	64.6	−5.4
Labor	Albert Holzapfel	2,361	30.5	+0.7
Independent	Vrettos Cominos	375	4.9	+4.9
Total formal votes		7,730	98.7	
Informal votes		103	1.3	
Turnout		7,833	90.6	
Two-party-preferred result
National	Vince Lester	5,179	67.0	−3.9
Labor	Albert Holzapfel	2,551	33.0	+3.9
National hold		Swing	−3.9	

1983 Queensland state election: Peak Downs
Party	Candidate	Votes	%	±%
National	Vince Lester	7,533	59.7	−1.6
Labor	Lindsay Shepherd	4,912	38.9	+2.4
Independent	Bruce Bragg	168	1.3	+1.3
Total formal votes		12,613	99.4	+0.1
Informal votes		72	0.6	−0.1
Turnout		12,685	91.2	+2.3
Two-party-preferred result
National	Vince Lester	7,617	60.4	−1.7
Labor	Lindsay Shepherd	4,996	39.6	+1.7
National hold		Swing	−1.7	

1980 Queensland state election: Peak Downs
Party	Candidate	Votes	%	±%
National	Vince Lester	6,235	61.3	+3.5
Labor	William Coffey	3,721	36.6	−5.6
Independent	Anthony Whitfield	167	1.6	+1.6
Progress	Robin Wright	54	0.5	+0.5
Total formal votes		10,177	99.3	+0.9
Informal votes		72	0.7	−0.9
Turnout		10,249	88.9	−1.6
Two-party-preferred result
National	Vince Lester	6,320	62.1	+4.3
Labor	William Coffey	3,857	37.9	−4.3
National hold		Swing	+4.3	

=== Elections in the 1970s ===
1977 Queensland state election: Peak Downs
Party	Candidate	Votes	%	±%
National	Vince Lester	4,724	57.8	+7.6
Labor	Leonard Nicholson	3,452	42.2	+0.8
Total formal votes		8,176	98.4	
Informal votes		129	1.6	
Turnout		8,305	90.5	
National hold		Swing	−1.1	
