= Diane Rehm =

American public radio talk show host (born 1936)

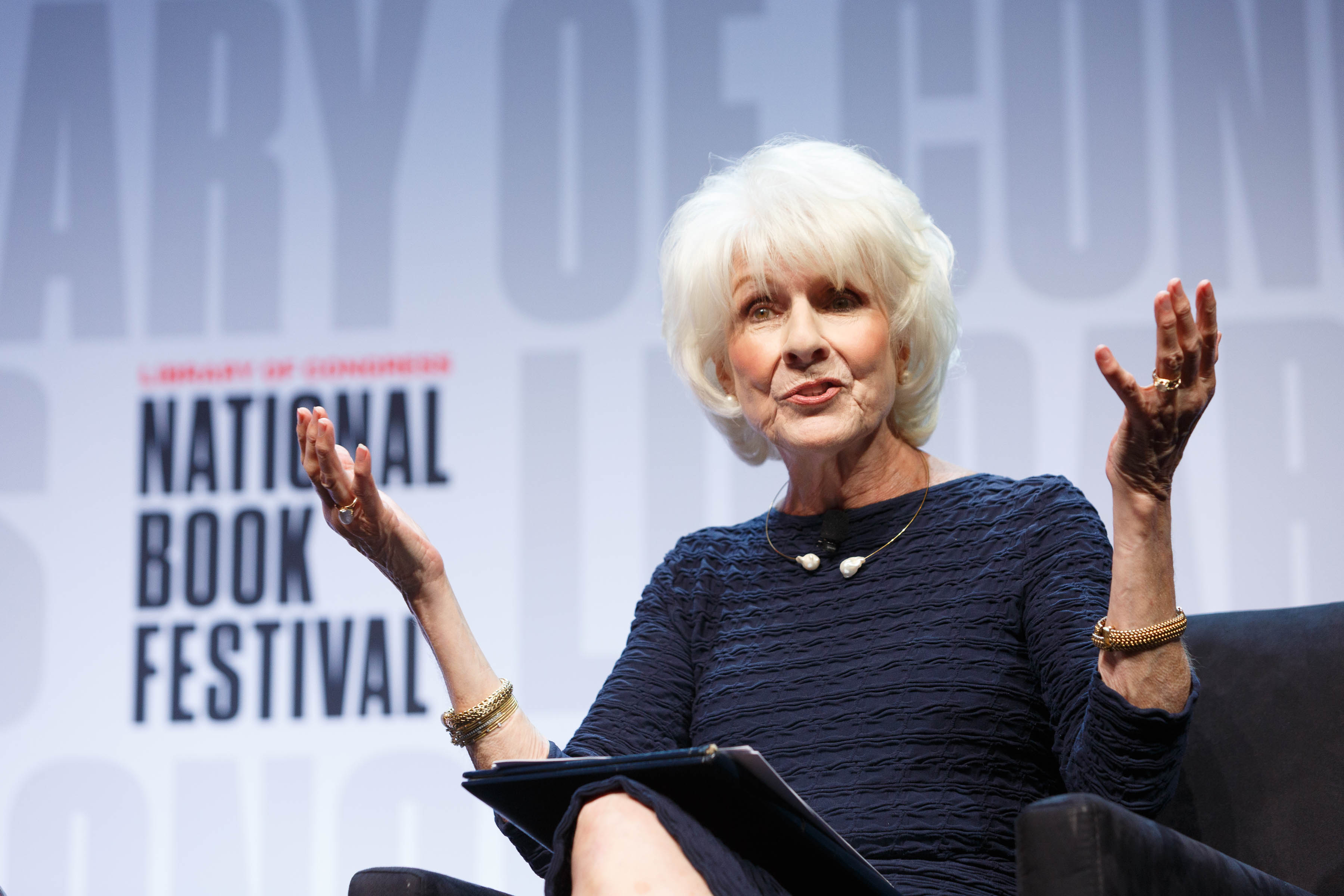
- Rehm in 2019
- Born: Diane Aed; September 21, 1936 (age 90); Washington, D.C.
- Spouses: John Rehm (1959–2014; his death); John Hagedorn (m. 2017)
- Children: David Rehm; Jennifer Rehm
- Presenting career
- Show: The Diane Rehm Show
- Network: NPR
- Country: United States
- Website: thedianerehmshow.org

Diane Rehm (/ˈriːm/; born Diane Aed; September 21, 1936) is an American journalist. She is best known as the former host of The Diane Rehm Show, a public radio talk show produced from 1979 to 2016 by WAMU in Washington, D.C. An advocate for the right to die, Rehm has written a book and co-produced a PBS documentary about end-of-life care and the right-to-die movement titled When My Time Comes.

Rehm had announced her plans to retire from hosting the show after the 2016 elections. The final program was recorded and distributed on December 23, 2016. Rehm announced she was going to host a weekly podcast, which she began doing in January 2017.

Rehm is the co-producer, narrator, and interviewer of When My Time Comes, distributed by PBS stations across the country. Her book by the same name was published in 2020 by Knopf. The Washington Post describes Rehm as a leading voice in the right to die debate.

== Early life ==
Rehm was born in Washington, D.C. According to Rehm's autobiography, Finding My Voice, her father's family were Eastern Orthodox Christians from Ottoman Mersin, a city on the southern coast of Anatolia. According to Rehm, the family were Lebanese, and her mother was fluent in both French and Arabic. Rehm's father immigrated to the United States in 1911, following his older brothers. He returned to Mersin to marry her mother, but found that she and her family were living in Alexandria, Egypt. He brought her to the United States in 1929; family memories of how the two met vary. In a 2012 interview in The Washingtonian, she describes her father as coming from Beirut, Lebanon.

Rehm attended William B. Powell Elementary and Roosevelt High School in Washington, D.C. Upon graduation, she was employed by the city's highways department, where she became a radio dispatcher.

== Personal life ==
Rehm married John Rehm, her first husband, in 1959; he was working at the State Department, where she was working as a secretary. John Rehm died June 23, 2014, after he stopped eating and drinking to end his suffering from Parkinson's disease. After his death, Rehm became a staunch advocate for medical aid in dying, arguing that no one should suffer needlessly in the way that her husband did. She has two adult children, David and Jennifer, and two grandchildren. On October 14, 2017, Diane Rehm and John Hagedorn were married at the Washington National Cathedral.

In 1998, Rehm began having difficulty speaking normally. Eventually, she was treated at Johns Hopkins Hospital and was diagnosed with spasmodic dysphonia, a neurological condition that affects the quality of her voice. The condition is treatable but not curable. After a short break, Rehm's career continued and her radio show went on until December 2016.

Rehm is a practicing Episcopalian. She was close friends with Jane Holmes Dixon, the second woman to be consecrated as a bishop in the Episcopal Church, who she met while attending St. Patrick's Episcopal Church in Washington.

== Career ==
Rehm began her radio career in 1973 as a volunteer for WAMU's The Home Show. In 1979, she took over as the host of WAMU's morning talk show, Kaleidoscope, which was renamed The Diane Rehm Show in 1984.

Rehm has interviewed many political and cultural figures, including John McCain, Barack Obama, and Madeleine Albright. She has said that her most touching interview was with Fred Rogers of the PBS program Mister Rogers' Neighborhood, conducted just before his death. Rehm has described her interviews with Bill Clinton and Hillary Clinton to have been "amazing experiences."

She has written three autobiographical books. The first, Finding My Voice, dealt with her traditional upbringing in a Christian Arab household, her brief first marriage and divorce, her 50-year marriage to John Rehm, raising her children, the first 20 years of her radio career, and her battles with depression, and spasmodic dysphonia. Together with John Rehm she co-wrote Toward Commitment: A Dialogue About Marriage, which was published in 2002.

Her memoir, On My Own, was published by Alfred A. Knopf in 2016.

The final broadcast of The Diane Rehm Show was aired on December 23, 2016. Rehm remained on the WAMU payroll as she started her podcast. During an all-staff meeting in 2024, she criticized the station's decision to shutter DCist and lay off staff. In March 2025, Rehm announced she had taken a buyout from American University. Her last day was May 2.

== Corporation for Public Broadcasting report ==
In 2005, a private study funded by the Corporation for Public Broadcasting reported that Rehm booked 22 liberal guests for every five conservative guests. The study was criticized as a politicized attempt to, in Rehm's word, "scare" journalists with the accusation of liberal bias. One criticism of the study concerned its criteria of what constituted "liberal" – a category which included seemingly moderate Republicans such as Senator Chuck Hagel and former Representative Bob Barr. The study was commissioned by Kenneth Tomlinson, whose appointment to the chairmanship of the CPB by George W. Bush had been criticized by liberals as politically motivated. Tomlinson hired Indiana consultant Frederick W. Mann, a conservative thinker previously associated with the Young America's Foundation, which has described itself as "the principal outreach organization of the Conservative Movement".

A report on the study by the CPB's Inspector General, Kenneth Konz, criticized Tomlinson's methods; the report led to Tomlinson's immediate resignation in November 2005. According to The Washington Post, Rehm personally "called Mann's findings 'unprofessional and simplistic.' [and] added 'I've been booking shows for 25 years. I don't think they have any idea what it takes to achieve the professionalism and expertise and the right people to express a variety of points of view. . . . What [Kenneth Tomlinson]'s doing, I think, is trying to scare public broadcasters.' "

== Documentaries ==
Rehm has been featured in three political movie documentaries: Jimmy Carter: Man from Plains, I.O.U.S.A., and Dinesh D'Souza's 2016: Obama's America which used her quote, "And then you've got the cover of Forbes magazine, a cover story by Dinesh D'Souza. I think nothing has turned my stomach so much in recent years as reading that piece."

Rehm also collaborated with Joe Fab on a documentary "When My Time Comes: Conversations About Whether Those Who Are Dying Should Have the Right to Determine When Life Should End", which aired in April 2021 on PBS.

== Controversies ==
=== 2015 Bernie Sanders interview ===
On June 10, 2015, Rehm interviewed 2016 Democratic presidential candidate Bernie Sanders, and stated that Sanders had dual citizenship with Israel; this was not true. Sanders denied that he holds dual citizenship, but Rehm repeated her assertion of the senator's dual citizenship as a fact. Sophia Tesfaye of Salon pointed out that Rehm apparently fell for an antisemitic canard and did not successfully fact-check her information before she conducted her interview with Sanders. In The Times of Israel, Gedalyah Reback stated that the interview was controversial because Rehm seemed to have accused a Jewish U.S. presidential candidate of maintaining secret Israeli citizenship.

Rehm apologized for her exchange with Sanders in a statement released later that day. "On today's show I made a mistake. Rather than asking if Senator and presidential candidate Bernie Sanders whether he had dual U.S./Israeli citizenship, as I had read in a comment on Facebook, I stated it as fact. I want to apologize as well to all our listeners for having made an erroneous statement. I am sorry for the mistake. However, I am glad to play a role in putting this rumor to rest." Jewish Journalist Josh Marshall called her apology "a total crock." Jewish Law professor David Bernstein found it strange that both Rehm and her producer fell for what he felt was an obvious antisemitic hoax. He speculated that frequently-heard strange accusations about Jewish supporters of Israel may have played a role. Elizabeth Jepsen, NPR's ombudsman, took issue with both Rehm's interview and apology: "Far from putting anything to rest, Rehm has now taken a falsehood from the fringes of the Internet and moved it into the mainstream conversation."

=== Right-to-die advocacy ===
Following the 2014 intentional death of her husband, John, Rehm became an advocate for the right to die. John was desperate to avoid continued and progressively degrading late-stage Parkinson's Disease symptoms, but Maryland has not legalized medical aid in dying. He was determined to ending his suffering and instead choose to voluntarily stop eating and drinking, which took ten days to complete.

NPR's ombudsman deemed that her related fundraising for Compassion & Choices violated the NPR ethical standards, and she agreed to stop attending fundraising dinners.

In February 2020 she published a book containing 40 interviews with people involved in and holding different views on questions related to the end-of-life care and the right-to-die movement. Titled When My Time Comes: Conversations About Whether Those Who Are Dying Should Have the Right to Determine When Life Should End, its foreword was contributed by John Grisham. She also collaborated with Joe Fab on a documentary with the same title that was aired in April 2021 on PBS.

== Honors and awards ==
A partial list of Rehm's honors and awards:

- 1999 Washingtonian of the Year by Washingtonian magazine.
- 2000 Fellow of the Society of Professional Journalists, honoring extraordinary contributions to journalism.
- 2003 Calvary Women's Services Hope award, honoring her volunteer and professional work for women in need.
- 2003 Montgomery County Chapter of the National Organization for Women's Susan B. Anthony Award, honoring her advocacy of women's right in the community.
- 2006 Urbino Press Award
- 2009 Peabody Award (presented in 2010)
- 2010 Foremother Award for Lifetime Achievement from the National Research Center for Women & Families
- 2013 ACCESS Arab-American of the Year
- 2014 National Humanities Medal
- 2017 Walter Cronkite Faith and Freedom Award

== Writings ==
- When My Time Comes: Conversations About Whether Those Who Are Dying Should Have the Right to Determine When Life Should End (Knopf, 2020). ISBN 9780525654759
