= Hiltzik =

Hiltzik is a surname. Notable people with the surname include:

- Matthew Hiltzik (born 1972), American publicist and attorney
- Michael Hiltzik (born 1952), American journalist and writer
- Robert Hiltzik (born c. 1957), American film director
