= William Henry Campbell (Queensland politician) =

The Hon William Campbell
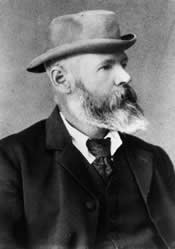

Member of the Queensland Legislative Council
- In office 12 July 1906 – 17 June 1919

Personal details
- Born: William Henry Campbell; 18 July 1846 Jersey, Channel Islands
- Died: 17 June 1919 (aged 72) Barcaldine, Queensland, Australia
- Resting place: Barcaldine Cemetery
- Spouse: Lucy Neale (m.1879 d.1944)
- Occupation: Journalist

William Henry Campbell was a politician and newspaper editor/proprietor in Queensland, Australia. He was a Member of the Queensland Legislative Council.

== Early life ==
William Henry Campbell was born on 18 July 1846 at Jersey in the Channel Islands, the son of Major-General Charles Stewart Campbell and his wife Elizabeth Charlotte (née Dale). His father was wounded at the Battle of Waterloo and was retired. The family moved to England where William Campbell attended private primary schools and Bluecoat School, a military school. He had a natural artistic skill, which he used to create pencil caricatures as well as oil and watercolour paintings.

At the age of about sixteen, William Campbell accompanied one of his brothers to New Zealand during the New Zealand Wars. William studied the Māori language and acted as an interpreter for his brother's regiment.

After that, he went to Queensland and made his way to the Palmer River Goldfields near Cooktown. There he contracted a fever which made him an invalid for months. While in North Queensland, he met Spencer Browne who had newspaper interests in Cooktown where the brothers Charles John James and Frederic Robert James were working. William Campbell contributed numerous articles on various subjects to this newspaper.

William Campbell then travelled to New South Wales where he wrote and sketched for a number of newspapers. Sir Henry Parkes liked his work and offered him an appointment at a salary of £1000 a year on one of his newspapers. He also travelled to Victoria and worked for a time on The Argus, a Melbourne newspaper.

== Business life ==
In the early 1870s, William Campbell arrived in Blackall, Queensland, where he joined Mr Monahan in establishing a newspaper, The Western Champion. However, Mr Monahan retired soon after and William Campbell continued to run the newspaper on his own until 1879, when he was joined by the James brothers from Cooktown. The three entered into a partnership that continued until William Campbell's death. In about 1885, they relocated the newspaper to Barcaldine.

== Political life ==
The death of Francis Reid Murphy created a by-election in the Queensland electoral district of Barcoo on 5 March 1892. Thomas McIlwraith, a former Queensland Premier urged Campbell to stand for election against shearer Tommy Ryan (not to be confused with the Queensland Premier T. J. Ryan), who was the first endorsed Labor candidate in Queensland. Ryan won the election.

Although he was not successful in state politics, Campbell took an active interest in local affairs and was a member of the Barcaldine Divisional Board from 1897 to 1906, as well as involving himself in many other local organisations.

On 12 July 1906, Campbell was appointed for life to the Queensland Legislative Council. He and his family moved to live in South Brisbane, but made regular visits to Barcaldine. In January 1917, following devastating floods, the Queensland Government asked Campbell to be part of a commission to inspect Clermont, Queensland, and to advise the government on how best to assist. During the visit to Clermont, Campbell contracted asthma (today the link between flooding and asthma is well-known). The appointment terminated on his death on 17 June 1919.

== Later life ==
William Campbell died on 17 June 1919 at his home Craignish, Barcaldine, Queensland aged 72 years 11 months. He had been ill for about two years prior to his death, suffering from asthma contracted in Clermont which weakened his heart. He was buried in the Barcaldine Cemetery on 18 June 1919.
