= William W. Campbell =

William W. Campbell may refer to:

- William Wallace Campbell (1862–1938), American astronomer
- William W. Campbell (New York congressman) (1806–1881), US congressman from New York
- William Wildman Campbell (1853–1927), Ohio politician
- William Wilfred Campbell (1858–1918), Canadian poet
- William Whitmore Campbell (1870–1934), American lawyer and politician from New York
- William W. Campbell (Schenectady County, NY), New York assemblyman 1921, in 144th New York State Legislature

== See also ==
- William Campbell (disambiguation)
