= The Diane Rehm Show =

- Genre: Talk radio
- Running time: 102 minutes 40 seconds
- Country of origin: United States
- Language(s): English
- Home station: WAMU
- Syndicates: NPR; Sirius Satellite Radio
- Hosted by: Diane Rehm
- Produced by: Sandra Pinkard; Nancy Robertson; Susan Casey; Denise Couture; Monique Nazareth; Sarah Ashworth
- Recording studio: Washington, D.C.
- Original release: 1970s – December 23, 2016
- Audio format: Stereophonic
- Opening theme: Allègre from "Toot Suite", Maurice André, trumpet, Claude Bolling, piano and composer
- Ending theme: Same as opening theme
- Website: thedianerehmshow.org

The Diane Rehm Show was a call-in show based in the United States that aired nationally on NPR (National Public Radio). In October 2007, The Diane Rehm Show was named to the Audience Research Analysis list of the top ten most powerful national programs in public radio, the only talk show on the list. ACT 1 Systems Inc., using Nielsen audience data, estimated that the program (sometimes shortened to "The DR Show") at that time had "1.7 million listeners," a number that was later revised upward to 2.4 million listeners in December 2015. It was produced by WAMU and hosted by Diane Rehm. The show debuted on WAMU in the 1970s as Kaleidoscope, a weekday morning arts and discussion program. Diane took over as host in 1979, and the show became The Diane Rehm Show in 1984. The final broadcast of The Diane Rehm Show was aired on December 23, 2016. As of January 2, 2017, WAMU broadcasts 1A in the same timeslot.

== Format ==
The show aired live Monday through Friday from 10:00 to 12:00 EST, but some local stations re-aired it at later times. The first hour of the show was an in-depth discussion of a topic or theme in the news. Occasionally, it was an interview with a newsmaker. Two examples of past show topics for the first hour include "European & Arab Media on the U.S. in Iraq" and "Drug-Resistant Bacteria". The second hour was either an interview with an author about a book or a segment of general interest. The books could be fiction or nonfiction and covered a wide range of subjects and opinions. Occasionally, Rehm allowed callers to call in and interact with the author directly, often resulting in a lively debate.

There were also recurring features. Each Friday, there was a two-hour weekly "News Roundup" where the major national and international headlines of the past week were discussed by reporters. The first hour was devoted to domestic American news, the second to international stories. A (usually) monthly "Reader's Review" was when older books are reviewed and discussed.

The show was produced by Sandra Pinkard, Nancy Robertson, Susan Nabors and Denise Couture, Monique Nazareth and Sarah Ashworth. The engineers were Tobey Schreiner, Jonathan Charry, Timothy Olmstead, and Andrew Chadwick. Natalie Yuravlivker answered the phones. Streaming recordings of the show are available via the official web site.

== Host ==
Diane Rehm hosted the show from 1979, when it was titled 'Kaleidoscope'; it was renamed for her in 1984. The show was sometimes guest hosted when Rehm was out for treatment for her spasmodic dysphonia, by a rotating list of NPR and NPR-related hosts including Susan Page, Tom Gjelten, Steve Roberts, Terence Smith, Frank Sesno, Andrea Seabrook, and Katty Kay. In March 2007, Rehm missed shows due to a bout of pneumonia. In March 2007, Diane Rehm suffered severe and painful corneal burns when she sprayed perfume on her contact lens during a trip to Oklahoma City. Rehm said that she labeled the identical three-ounce tinted plastic bottles to show they held different solutions but that the labels became blurred and hard to read, especially without her lenses in.

From August 21 into September 2009, Susan Page, of USA Today, filled in for the sidelined host, initially reporting that Rehm "caught her heel in the hem of her slacks while she was dashing across the street yesterday afternoon, and she cracked her pelvis when she fell." Rehm's spasmodic dysphonia has also required her to miss several shows in recent years.

Rehm announced her retirement from the show on December 8, 2015. The final broadcast of The Diane Rehm Show was aired on December 23, 2016.

== Awards ==
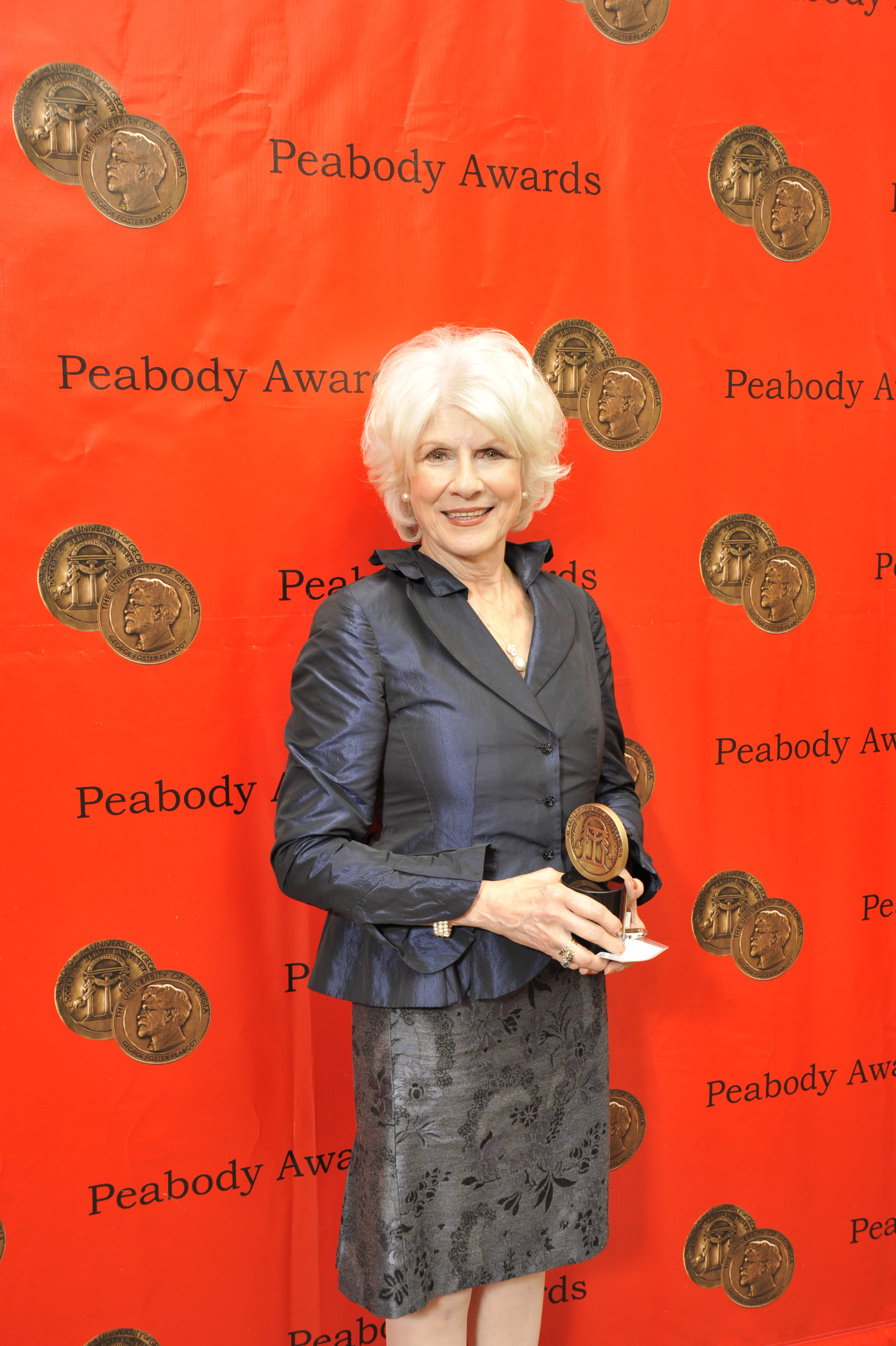
Diane Rehm at the 69th Annual Peabody Awards

Awards won include: the 2002 New York Festival Bronze World Medal for Best Regularly Scheduled Talk Program Interview, the 2002 American Bar Association Silver Gavel Honorable Mention, the 1999 New York Festival's Bronze World Medal, and two 1999 American Women in Radio and Television first place Gracie Allen Awards. In 2009, Diane Rehm won a coveted George Foster Peabody Award.
