= Mount Saint Benedict =

Benedictine monastery in Saint Augustine, Trinidad and Tobago

Abbey of Our Lady of Exile
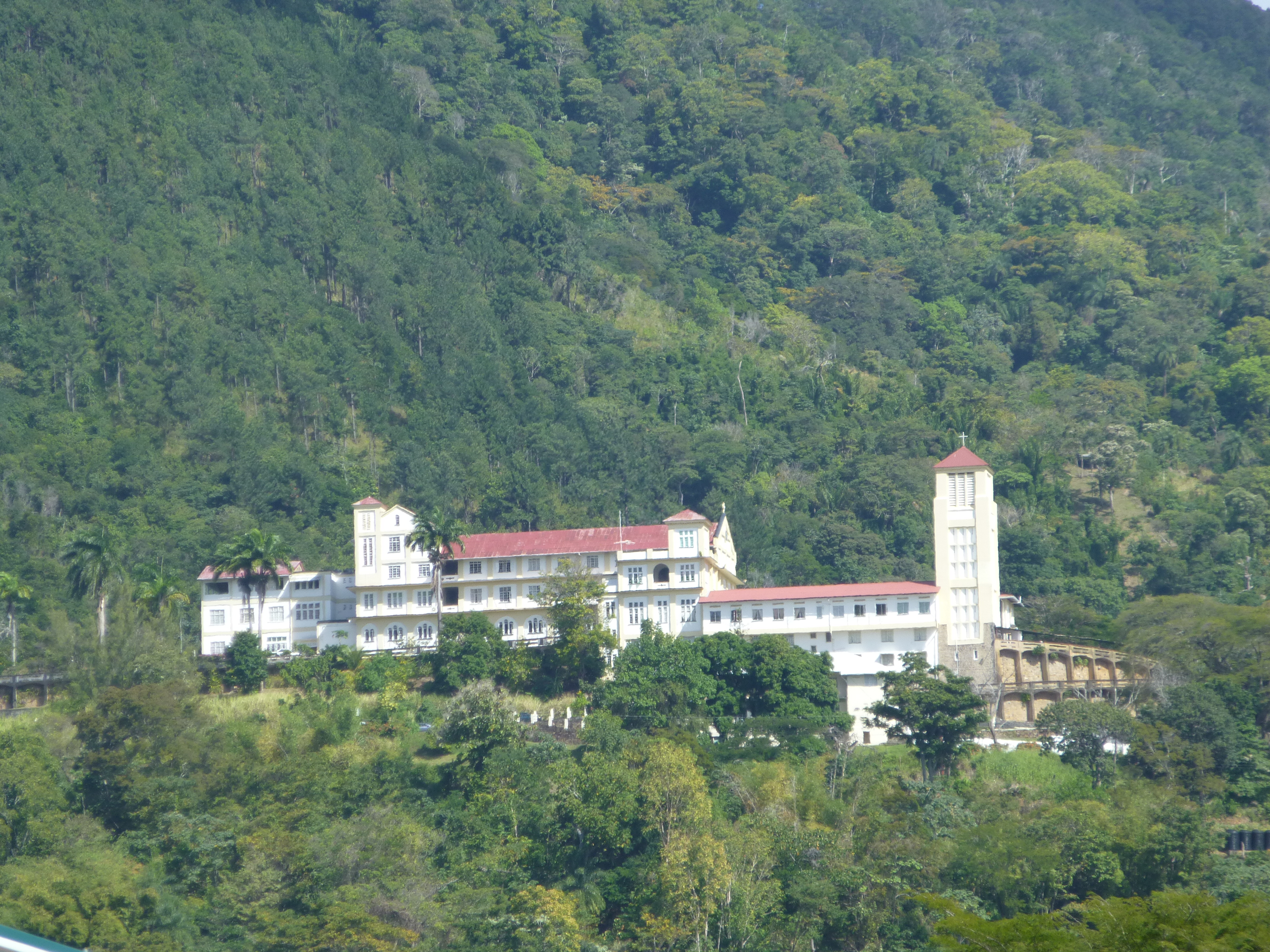
- Mount St Benedict

Religion
- Affiliation: Roman Catholic Church
- Region: Tunapuna–Piarco

Location
- Location: St. Augustine, Trinidad and Tobago
- Interactive map of Abbey of Our Lady of Exile
- Coordinates: 10.6628°N 61.3964°W

Website
- http://www.mountstbenedictabbey.org/

Mount Saint Benedict Abbey, also known as The Abbey of Our Lady of Exile, is a Benedictine monastery following the Order of Saint Benedict. This monastery is located in the northwestern town of St. Augustine in Tunapuna–Piarco in Trinidad and Tobago.The Benedictine Order was founded by Saint Benedict of Nursia who wrote The Rule of Saint Benedict followed by all Benedictines. The Motto of the Order is Ora Et Labora, 'Pray and Work'. Benedict, born in 480 in Nursia, Italy, was sent by his family to Rome to study law. Revolted by the immoral atmosphere of the city, he decided to become a hermit, spending his days in seclusion and prayer. Eventually, Benedict gained a following and established the Benedictine order.

== History ==
Mount Saint Benedict Abbey was established in 1912 on 240 acres of land approximately 700 feet above sea level, purchased by Dom Mayeul De Caigny, a Brazilian Benedictine monk from Trinidad and Andrew Gomez. By June 27, 1912, the land was officially Benedictine property.

The Archbishop of Port of Spain took offence to Dom Mayeul and his companions referring to Trinidad as "missionary territory". Don Mayeul was told that there were over 100,000 Hindus in Trinidad and hoped to focus his efforts on evangelizing these groups. Trinidad was, however, converted to Catholicism following its discovery by Christopher Columbus in the 1500s.

On 6 October 1912, three monks arrived in Trinidad to establish the abbey: Dom Ambrose, Dom Paul and Dom Mayeul. The monks were welcomed by the nearby Parish of Arouca and were housed there until receiving more monks to begin construction of their property. On November 27, 1912, two more religious brothers were received: Brother Joseph Kleinmann and Brother Donatian Marcus. Brother Kleinmann, a carpenter, began to convert the small hut existing on the property into two rooms, an oratory, and a dormitory. Brother Kleinmann even went on to work on the challenge of bringing fresh water to the monastery. By laying down thousands of feet of pipe, this brother was able to bring water at the rate of five gallons per minutes from the Crown Lands ravine to the monastery. Soon, the Trinidadian people began to give the brothers furniture, cooking utensils, chickens, eggs, rice, and coffee.

On July 24, 1913, a contractor, A.D. Degazon was hired to construct a road that would provide a safe path from the bottom of the hill to the building site. Mayeul was responsible for purchasing several pieces of equipment for the Monks such as automated machines to cut and prepare wood and "a motor-driven unit to generate electricity". The religious brothers were able to create the choir stall, flooring, and roofs for many of the buildings. The chapel structure stood at 68 by 21 feet, with the first Mass being celebrated on August 10, 1913.

In 1949 William Wellesley Campbell retired from his medical career in British Guiana to become Brother Simeon, serving at Mount Saint Benedict until his death in 1962.

== The Abbey Today ==
Today, with its tower and red roofs, the abbey consists of a church, a monastery, a seminary, a drug rehabilitation center, a yogurt factory, and Pax Guest House, a place for retreat. The abbey welcomes and draws people of all faiths seeking peace, solace, purpose, and fulfillment. Mount Saint Benedict is currently presided over by Abbot John Pereira and houses ten monks.

== The Pax House ==
Pax means peace in Latin. The Pax House is a guest house that was built in 1916 on the grounds of Mount Saint Benedict. It features views of the rising Northern Range to the north and the low lying Caroni plains of central Trinidad to the south. The House offers general tours of its grounds and guided bird watching tours. The House is also notable for its famous Tea Room which was built during World War II and is the oldest in the country. It operates for a few hours each afternoon serving a variety of international teas and items produced on the premises such as honey and bread.

== Pax Yogurt Company ==
Yogurt has been made by the monks at Mount Saint Benedict since 1997 as a way to have a healthier diet. The monk who started to make the yogurt began to give some out to visitors and friends but it soon became a trend. People started to place orders and the monks realized that they had to think of a way to make more yogurt for the increased number of people who enjoyed eating it. The Pax Yogurt Company was started in April 2003 and now ships its products, in a variety of flavors, to supermarkets across the country. Hotels, "especially those with German guests", are also interested in getting yogurt deliveries.

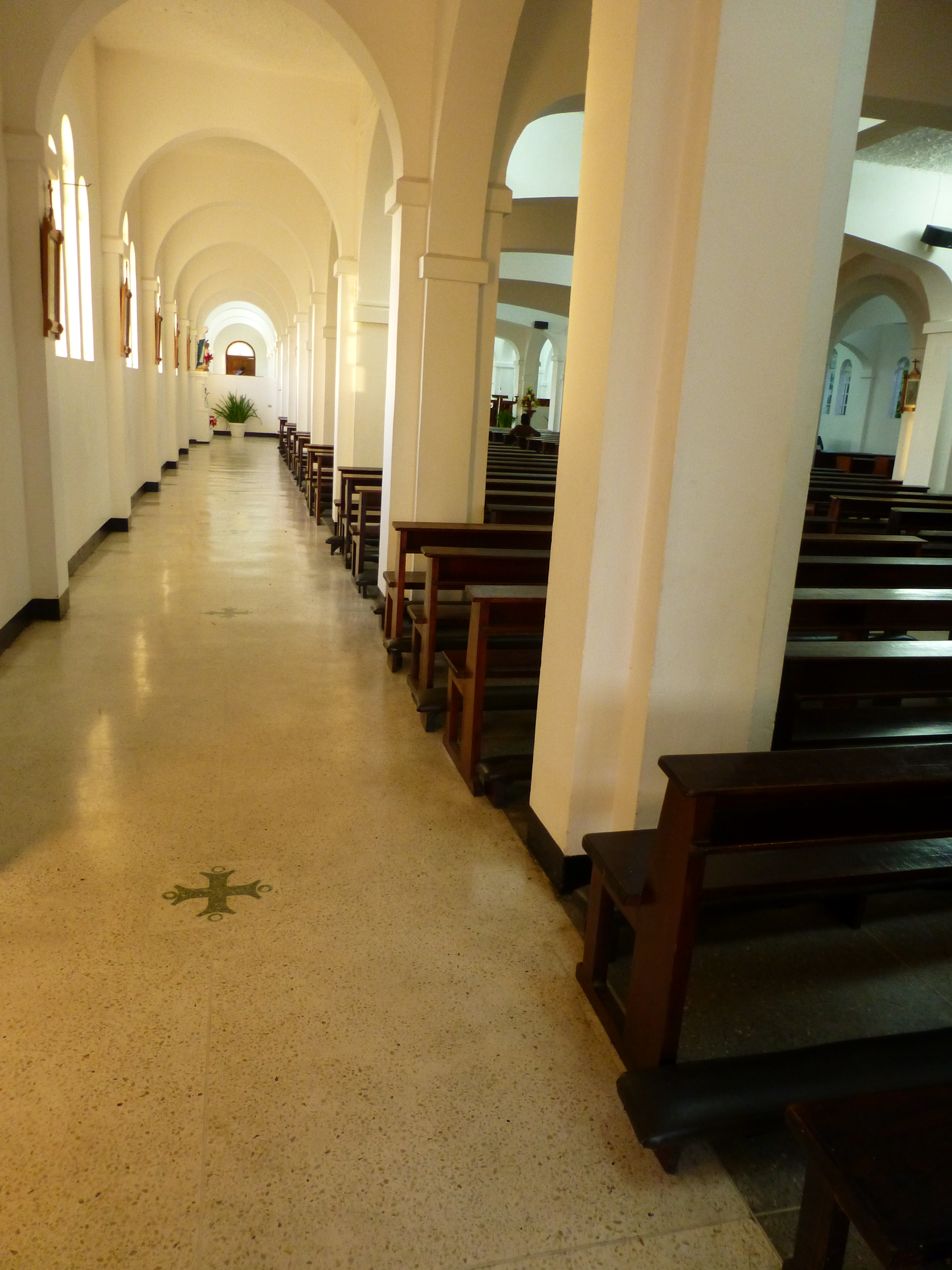
Church interior

== See also ==
- Abbey School, Trinidad and Tobago
