= Electoral district of Belyando =

State electoral district of Queensland, Australia

Belyando Queensland—Legislative Assembly
- State: Queensland
- Dates current: 1949-1960, 1971-1977
- Namesake: Belyando River

Belyando was an electoral district of the Legislative Assembly in the Australian state of Queensland in 2 incarnations from 1950 to 1977.

It was first created in the 1949 redistribution preceding the 1950 election, covering the central Queensland area around the Shire of Belyando. It was abolished in the redistribution preceding the 1960 election, its territory taken up by the district of Barcoo expanding eastward.

It was revived again in the 1971 redistribution, and was renamed Peak Downs from the 1977 election onwards.

It is pronounced Bel-yando.

== Members for Belyando ==
First incarnation (1950–1960)
Member	Party	Term
Tom Foley	Labor	1950–1957
Tom Foley	Queensland Labor	1957–1960
Second incarnation (1972–1977)
Eugene O'Donnell	Labor	1972–1974
Vince Lester	National	1974–1977

== See also ==
- Electoral districts of Queensland
- Members of the Queensland Legislative Assembly by year
- Category:Members of the Queensland Legislative Assembly by name
