= Paper Clips (film) =

- Directed by: Elliot Berlin; Joe Fab
- Written by: Joe Fab
- Produced by: Joe Fab; Matthew Hiltzik; Robert M. Johnson; Ari Daniel Pinchot
- Starring: Sandra Roberts; Peter Schroeder; Dagmar Schroeder; Tom Bosley
- Cinematography: Michael Marton
- Edited by: Julia Dixon-Eddy
- Music by: Charlie Barnett
- Production companies: Ergo Entertainment; The Johnson Group
- Distributed by: Slowhand Cinema Releasing
- Release dates: May 2, 2004 (Tribeca); September 8, 2004
- Running time: 84 minutes
- Country: United States
- Languages: English; German
- Box office: $1.2 million

Paper Clips is a 2004 American documentary film written and produced by Joe Fab, and directed by Fab and Elliot Berlin, about the Paper Clips Project, in which a middle school class tries to collect 6 million paper clips to represent the 6 million Jews killed by the Nazis during World War II.

== Synopsis ==
Paper Clips takes place in the rural, blue-collar Tennessee community of Whitwell, where a middle-school class attempts to gauge the magnitude of World War II's Holocaust by collecting paper clips, each of which represents a human life lost in the Nazis' slaughter of Jews. The idea came in 1998 from three of the teachers at the school and was completed in their eighth grade classrooms. The students ultimately succeeded in collecting over 25 million paperclips.

== Production ==
The documentary film about the project was officially released in 2004. This film's genesis lies with Rachel Pinchot who initially saw an article about the Whitwell Middle School in The Washington Post. She took the idea of a film to her husband, Ari Pinchot, of The Johnson Group. The Johnson Group sent a team led by directors Joe Fab and Elliot Berlin to Whitwell to film key moments, such as the arrival of several Holocaust survivors from New York who shared their experiences with the community. They accumulated about 150 hours of footage over the course of the project. Out of that footage, Berlin created a seven-minute presentation which he sent to Matthew Hiltzik, then head of communications at Miramax. Hiltzik was impressed by the demo and showed it to the head of Miramax, convinced that the project was worth a full-length documentary. The film was produced by Fab, Hiltzik, Pinchot, and Robert M. Johnson. Ergo Entertainment helped to produce the film, with its partners Donny Epstein, Yeeshai Gross, and Elie Landau joining the project as executive producers.

The film was described as being not yet another movie showing the tragedy, but a project of hope and inspiration. The movie features interviews with students, teachers, Holocaust survivors, and people who sent paper clips. It also shows how the railcar traveled from Germany to Baltimore, and then Whitwell. The movie was shown for the first time in November 2003 in Whitwell.

== Awards ==
- Winner of the 2020 Playback: Documentary Edition – Atlanta Jewish Film Festival (2020)
- Nominated for an Emmy for Outstanding Historical Programming (2006)
- Audience Choice Award – Jackson Hole Film Festival (2004), Marco Island Film Festival (2004), Palm Springs International Film Festival (2004), Rome International Film Festival (2004), Washington Jewish Film Festival (2004)
- Cowboy Award – Jackson Hole Film Festival (2004)
- NBR Award for Top Five Documentaries – National Board of Review (2004)
- Best Overall Film, Best Director, Best Original Score – Rome International Film Festival (2004)

== Literature ==
- Helene Meyers: The Unmarked Chains of Paper Clips, in: Shofar, Vol. 32, No. 3 (Spring 2014), pp. 30–49 (Purdue University Press)
- Lynne Fallwell, Robert G. Weiner: "Holocaust Documentaries" in The Routledge History of the Holocaust, ed. Jonathan C. Friedman, 2010, pp. 462 (Taylor & Francis)
