= The Western Champion (Queensland) =

Weekly newspaper in Queensland

Front page of The Western Champion, Saturday 6 September 1879.

The Western Champion was a newspaper published initially in Blackall and later in nearby Barcaldine, Queensland, Australia.

== History ==
The newspaper was initially published under the name The Western Champion from 1879 to 1891 by J. Monahan and William Henry Campbell.

The newspaper was published under the name The Western Champion and General Advertiser for the Central-Western Districts from 1892 to 1922 by William Henry Campbell, Charles John James and Frederic Robert James.

The newspaper was published under the name The Western Champion from 1922 to 1937 by William Henry Campbell, Charles John James and Frederic Robert James.

== Digitisation ==
The papers have been digitised as part of the Australian Newspapers Digitisation Program of the National Library of Australia.
