= William Campbell (metallographer) =

English metallurgist (1876–1936)

William Campbell, D.Sc., Ph.D., M.A. (24 June 1876 – 16 December 1936) was an English metallurgist, born at Newcastle upon Tyne, England. He graduated from the Durham College of Science of Durham University in 1898, and from Columbia University (Ph.D., 1903). He lectured on geology and metallurgy at Durham, and on geology at Columbia University where he became full professor of metallurgy in 1917. In 1924, he was appointed Howe professor of metallurgy.

From 1907 to 1911, he was metallographer to the United States Coast and Geodetic Survey. He worked at the Bureau of Mines and lectured at the United States Naval Academy. During World War I, he served with the National Research Council.

Campbell's papers from ca. 1900 to 1925 are held in the Columbia University archives.
