= The Abbey School, Faversham =

The Abbey School

Location
- London Road; Faversham, Kent, ME13 8RZ; England; 51.307182°N 0.885811°E

Information
- Type: Academy
- Motto: "Be the best you can be"
- Established: 1983
- Local authority: Kent
- Department for Education URN: 149893 Tables
- Ofsted: Reports
- Head teacher: Rowland Speller
- Age range: 11–19
- Enrollment: 1056
- Houses: Discovery, Pioneer, Endeavour, Voyager
- Newspaper: Abbey News

The Abbey School is a non-selective secondary school in the town of Faversham in Kent, United Kingdom. Founded with the amalgamation of Ethelbert Road Boys School and Lady Capel School for Girls in 1983, the school consists of 1056 pupils from the ages of 11–19. The school became an academy in August 2011 and joined The Howard Academy Trust on 1 April 2023

== History ==
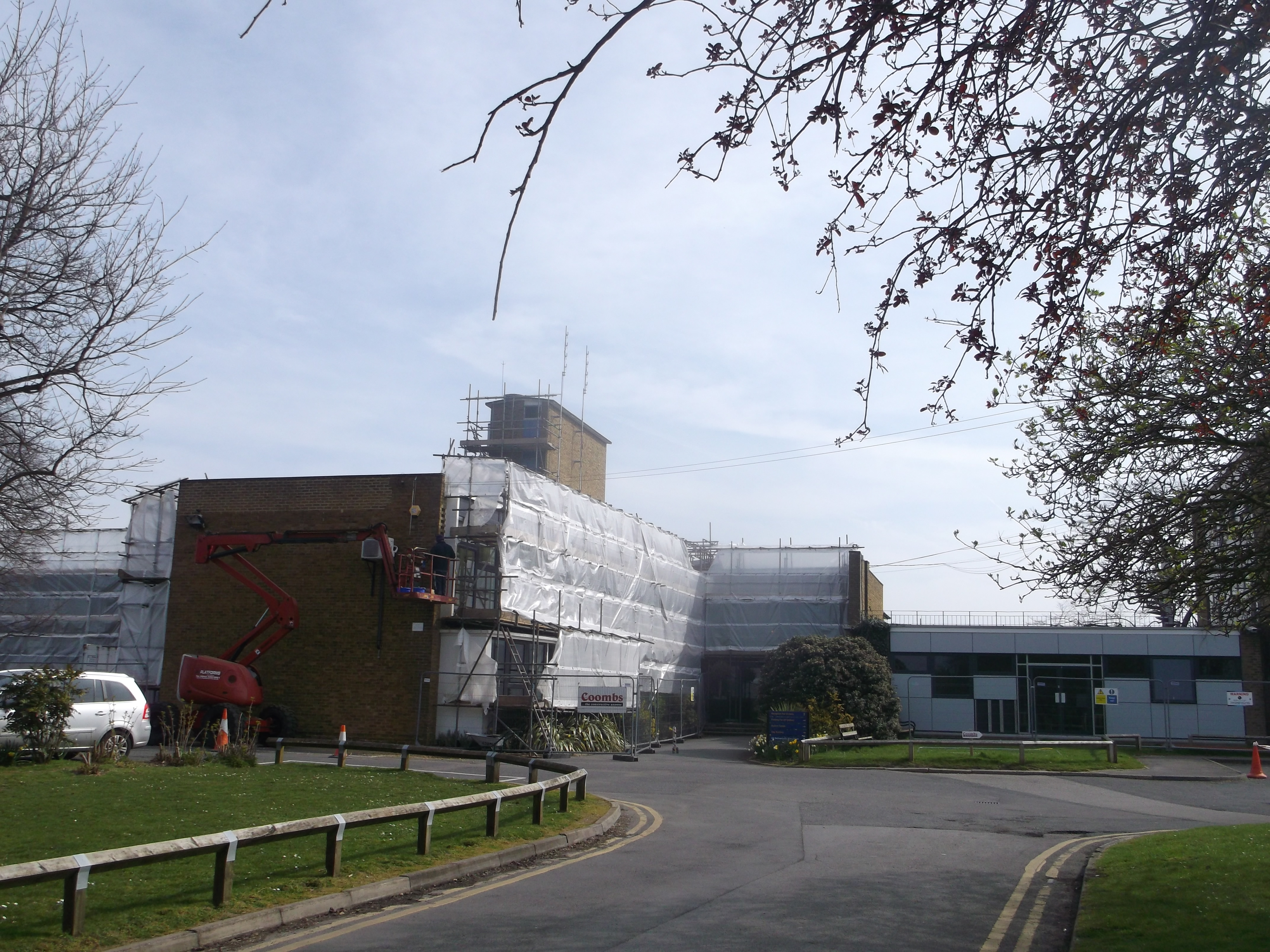
Abbey School's main building undergoing restoration, 2014

The School was opened in September 1983 with the amalgamation of Ethelbert Road Boys School and Lady Capel School for Girls with the whole process being overseen by its first head, Vin Thomas. The Boys school was decommissioned with students moving to the south side of Faversham where the school currently stands.

=== Peter Walker ===
In 1987, Peter Walker was the school's 2nd headteacher.

In February 2000, Walker threaten to report the deteriorating state of the 1940s built canteen to the Health and Safety Executive in attempt to get Kent County Council to replace it. Paul Carter (KCC) claimed that other projects had priority. The roof had become a thick layer of moss with asbestos that caused paint to peel off the walls.

In September 2004, with the support of parents, the school became the first to introduce random drug tests which commenced in January 2005. The tests could be performed only when parents gave permission for their child to be tested. Students who refused to be available for testing or tested positive would undergo a counselling program. Critics of the program stated an infringement of privacy would lead to legal action. At the school, 20 students were tested weekly and were given a mouth swab for cannabis, cocaine and heroin. Supporters of the program including former Prime Minister Tony Blair who endorsed Walker's efforts and called for the program to be expanded. In 2005, the school reported that the scheme helped to boost examination results to 40% compared with 32% in 2004, and 28% in 2003.

In 2006, Walker retired and became Britain's official ambassador for drug testing. He gave a presentation to John Walters, the director of the White House drug policy office.

=== Jenny James ===
His position was taken over by Jenny James who promised to continue drug testing. The scheme was ended in 2008, due to other schools not performing the tests. Within the space of four years, only one student tested positive.

=== Transition to academy governance ===
James was succeeded by Catrin Woodend after some months and oversaw the school's transition to an academy in 2011. Woodend also organised the building of the school's all-weather pitch which was completed in 2012.

In 2018, Catrin Woodend announced her retirement and was succeeded by Dr Rowland Speller.

In May 2022 Ofsted downgraded the School's rating from 'Good' to 'Inadequate' following their inspection citing concerns about safeguarding and in turn the leadership of the school.The grading caused national media controversy, not least because a significant part of the 2022 Ofsted report cited that the behaviour expectations in the school were 'oppressive' and that the level of 'compliance' expected from students did not support the culture of the school. Yet, just weeks later, the school reported record breaking A Level results and GCSE results.

It raised questions in the national consciousness about whether basic expectations were reasonable, particularly given the recent Covid pandemic. The school's own rules included sitting up in lessons, paying attention when the teaching is speaking, putting hands up to ask questions and avoiding interuping others when they are speaking. At the start of every day, all staff and students meet together on the playground or in the canteen, so that staff can check uniform and equipment and that students and ensure that they are 'ready to learn'.

Data published by the school in 2022 showed that the number of students leaving the school with Grade 5 or more in both English and Maths at GCSE had more than tripled compared to the year of the previous inspection (2017). Over the same period many more students were also receiving top A Level grades.

Katharine Birbalsingh (Chair of the Government's Social Mobility Commissioner) when speaking about the inspection outcome on national news said 'Ofsted have sort of let us down really' (GB News, 27 August 2022). Rod Liddle, writing in The Spectator, penned an article entitled 'How to Run a School' (27 August 2022), applauding the school and highlighting the incongruence between the high academic outcomes of the school in the face of the highly critical Ofsted comments.

In April 2023 The Abbey School became part of The Howard Academy Trust.

== Governance ==
The Governors are a Local Academy Board with delegated powers from The Howard Academy Trust's Trustees. The range of their responsibilities and is established by The Howard Academy Trust's Scheme of Delegation (SOD)

== School structure ==
=== Lower school ===
As of 2014, the lower school has an annual intake of 210 students at the beginning of Year Seven (age 11). The lower school (Years 7–11) is 865 students strong, for whom the school uniform for boys consists of a black jacket accompanied with the school badge on the breast pocket, with black trousers and a white shirt. Socks must be black, shoes must also be black and plain and shirts must be worn with a tie. The uniform for girls consists of a fitted black jacket accompanied with the school badge on the breast pocket, with black trousers and a white blouse with no tie.

=== Sixth form ===
In keeping with line with the school's ethos of Business and Enterprise, students have the expectation to dress in clothing suitable for the school's ethos.

The school maintains a Football Academy in Association with Dover Athletic F.C. and is currently run by coach Michael Sandmann. In 2012, two academy players Tom Axford and Lloyd Harrington, were selected for the England Schoolboy Internationals for the spring and the matches were broadcast live on Sky Sports.

== Curriculum ==
As of 2010, the school follows the National Curriculum in Years 7–11 and offers a broad range of GCSEs (national exams taken by students aged 14–16) and A-levels (national exams taken by pupils aged 16–18). The school has no affiliation with a particular religious denomination, but religious education is given throughout the school.

Students in Key Stage 3 are taught within the national curriculum with timetables arranged to allow students to work at the level of their ability. Students with learning disabilities receive additional support such as teaching in small groups, help from Learning Support Assistants or computer packages which aim to improve literacy and numeracy skills. Students in Key Stage 4 continue to study within the national curriculum but they are able to select a range of additional subjects they wish to study.

The school year runs from September to July, split across three terms: the autumn term (September to December), spring term (January to April) and the summer term (April to July). Students receive two weeks off for Christmas and Easter, a six-week summer break, and three "half term" breaks. Since October 2019, the half-term break in October has been two weeks long.

=== Examination ===
League tables published by The Daily Telegraph based on 2013 A-level results rank Abbey as the 34th best school in Kent. According to the Department of Education, in 2013 A-level students achieved an average of 520.9 QCDA points, against a national average of 796.6 and 51 percent of students achieved five or more grade C results (or equivalent) at GCSE, including Maths and English.

== Extra-curricular activities ==
The school has many clubs that use the Sport Centre of the school:-

- Alert Goal Keeping – www.alertgk.co.uk
- Comets Netball – www.pitchero.com/clubs/cometsnetballclub
- Danketsu – www.freewebs.com/danketsu
- Faversham Judo Club – www.favershamjudo.org
- Faversham Table Tennis Club – Jim Sixsmith – 01795 535884
- Faversham Town Youth & Juniors – www.upthetown.com
- Herne Hill Herons – dawesca.co.uk/herons-football
- Invicta Roller Hockey – www.rhcinvicta.co.uk
- Invicta Roller Skating – www.invictarsc.co.uk
- Just 4 Keepers – www.just4keepers.co.uk/goalkeeper-training-kent
- Kent Roller Girls – www.kentrollergirls.com
- Pitch Invasion – www.pitch-invasion.com
- Shotokhan Karate – karateinfaversham.clubbz.com
- Strike Force FC – www.favershamstrikeforce.co.uk
- TSA Taekwondo – www.tsatkd.org
- Zumba – www.milesdanceandfitness.com

== Property ==
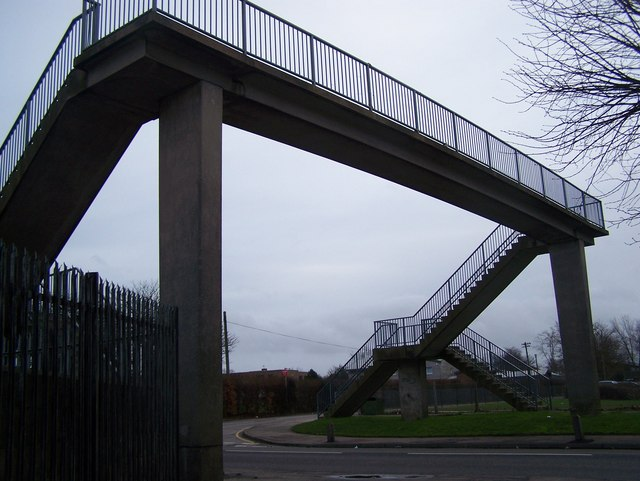
The footbridge overlooking the school (in the background)

The school runs a restaurant called 14–19 which opened in 2005 with food prepared, cooked and served by Vocational students who are studying Level 2 BTEC Hospitality and Catering. The majority of the food is locally sourced from Faversham and surrounding villages. Alongside the restaurant, there is an horticulture area and business units.

In 2012, a third generation all-weather football pitch was constructed on the grounds of the school. The pitch had been started by fundraising in 2009 with the final funding coming from the Kent FA with a grant of £390,000 and funds from charities Bensted and Queenborough Fisheries Trust. The construction work was carried out by Charles Lawrence Surfaces in conjunction with Surfacing Standards and Lano Sports, a Football Foundation Framework Partners at a cost of £650,000. The official opening ceremony was held on 19 July 2012 and was attended by Hugh Robertson along with headteacher Catrin Woodend. The 3G pitch surface is estimated to be used for a total of 90 hours with 2,200 players using it weekly.

The school created an all-purpose sports hall which would include improvements to the changing rooms and community gymnasium 'The Abbey Sports Centre' with a viewing gallery that would overlook the outdoor pitches. The plans secured backing of Faversham Town Council on 17 December 2012.

In 2013, the school was awarded £1.2million for a makeover to provide a new modern look and an energy efficient environment.

The Abbey runs a nursery called Twinkle Toes Nursery, which opened in 2009 and operates from a purpose built building on the site. The nursery employs 15 staff with two managers and a cook. The nursery is also subject to Ofsted inspections with the last held on 4 January 2011, stating the nursery is "well led and managed" with the inspection noting that the environment was "thoughtfully set out" along with parent relations as "very positive".

The school runs a dining hall and business centre that is located near the Autism Integration Unit and the dining hall is used for wedding receptions, dancing, charity fund-raising events and the annual Year 11 Prom. Usage for the Business room which includes Businesses, Adult Education, use as a conference room, training venue and ICT training. An Outdoor Performance Area (OPA) is maintained with a capacity of 70 people and is used for outdoor performances relating to productions mainly held during the summer. Previous uses of the OPA have included karaoke competitions and events in the style of the musical talent show The X Factor.

In the summer break, between the end of the 2020-2021 and the start of the 2021-2022 academic years, the old C block (where food tech, design tech and MFL classes took place) was demolished and was replaced with a newly constructed C block to the northern side of the playground. C block now hosts Media studies, Sports science, MFL, Food tech, Art, Design technology and the only lift in the school and the only consistently open unisex toilets in the school. Also, the business conference rooms have now been replaced with the new LRC/Library that is accessible during lunch times to complete work in.
