= Ned Davis (politician) =

Australian politician

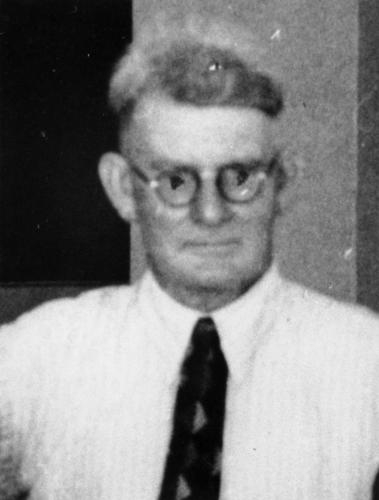

Member of the Queensland Legislative Assembly for Barcoo
- In office 1 May 1943 – 10 April 1961
- Preceded by: Frank Bulcock
- Succeeded by: Eugene O'Donnell

Personal details
- Born: Edward William Davis; 1886 Yarrangundy, New South Wales, Australia
- Died: 1961 (aged 74–75) Brisbane, Queensland, Australia
- Party: Labor
- Spouse: Mary Ann McLauchlan Williamson (m.1919)
- Occupation: Trade union organiser

Edward William Davis (1886 – 10 April 1961) was a politician in Queensland, Australia. He was a Member of the Queensland Legislative Assembly.

== Politics ==
Davis represented the seat of Barcoo from 1943 till his death in 1961. He was the western district secretary of the Australian Workers' Union before his election, and had previously been an organiser in western Queensland.

Parliament of Queensland
Preceded by Frank Bulcock	Member for Barcoo; 1943–1961	Succeeded by Eugene O'Donnell
