= William Campbell (London Missionary Society) =

Missionary to India (1799–1879)

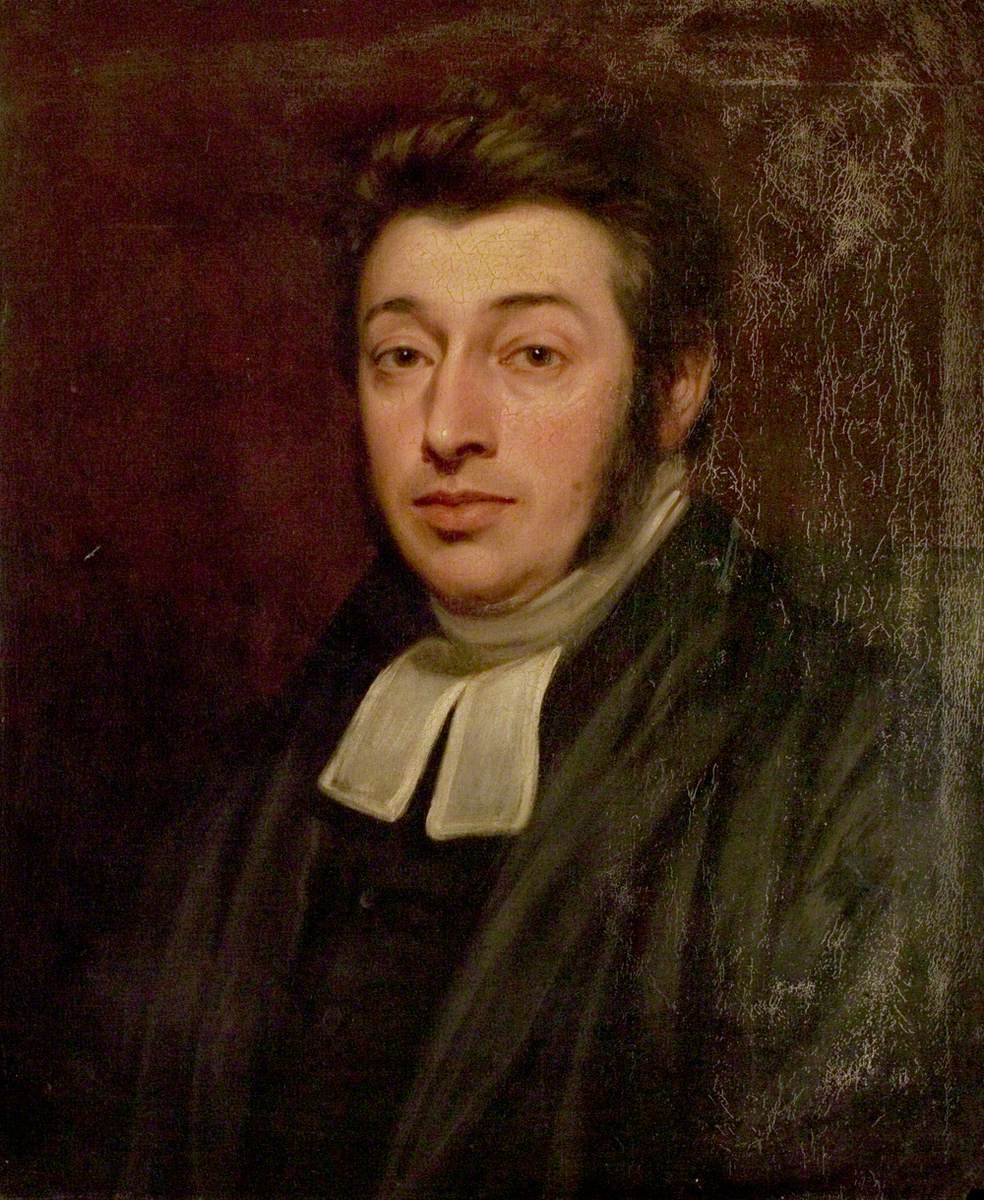

William Campbell (28 May 1799 – 14 December 1878) was a British missionary in the London Missionary Society who served in India. He wrote a book on life in British India and was a vocal opponent of Lord Macaulay's linguistic policy of favouring English usage in India.

Campbell was born in Old Kilpatrick, Dumbartonshire. He studied surgery (Ch.M.) at Glasgow and then at Gosport. He joined the London Missionary Society, ordained at Liverpool on 13 August 1823 and appointed to work at Bangalore. He married Anne Keet and sailed to India on January 7, 1824. He reached Bangalore on June 27. He worked with Kannada speaking people in Bangalore where others had worked mainly in Tamil in the Cantonment area. He returned to England in 1832 due to his wife's poor health. He left the foreign service of the LMS and returned to England to work at Croydon from 1841. He wrote a book on life in British India in 1839. In his writings he was surprised by the lack of knowledge of Indian matters in Britain and was opposed to the use of English in the education of Indians and sought the use of local languages. He died at Islington.
