= Matthew Hiltzik =

American publicist (born 1972)

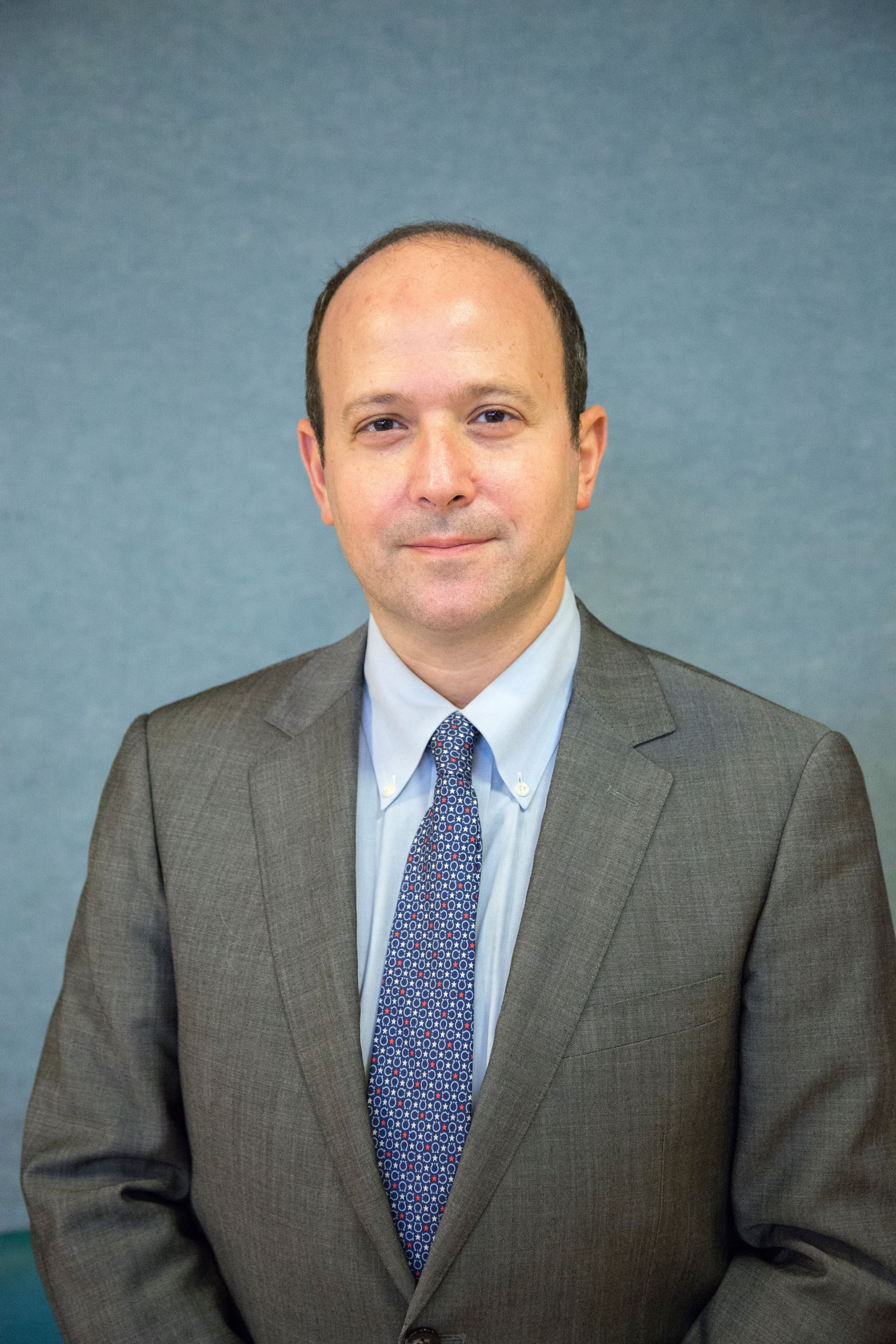
- Hiltzik in November 2020
- Born: May 12, 1972 (age 54)
- Education: Cornell University (BSILR); Fordham Law School (JD)
- Occupations: Lawyer, publicist
- Spouse: Dana
- Children: 3

Matthew Hiltzik (born May 12, 1972) is an American lawyer and publicist. He is the founder of Hiltzik Strategies, which represents high-profile organizations and individuals such as various politicians and Hollywood figures. He has also occasionally been an executive producer on documentaries and written for magazines.

== Early life ==
Hiltzik was born on May 12, 1972. He grew up in Teaneck, New Jersey. He attended the Yavneh Academy. He graduated from the Ramaz School. He attended the Cornell University School of Industrial and Labor Relations and then the Fordham University School of Law.

== Career ==
Hiltzik is a member of the New York State Bar Association. After law school, he worked as press secretary and deputy executive director of the New York State Democratic Committee under Judith Hope, the first woman to head a major political party in New York. While in that role, he worked on the 1998 campaigns of Chuck Schumer and Eliot Spitzer, and Hillary Clinton's Listening Tour in July 1999. In December 1999, Hiltzik joined Miramax as head of corporate communications. He became senior vice president of corporate communications and government relations, and was involved in public relations for Miramax Films, Miramax Books, Miramax TV, Talk magazine, philanthropic and political fundraising and crisis management.

In 2000, Hiltzik took a brief leave from Miramax to re-join Hillary Clinton's senatorial campaign as the director of Jewish relations. Hiltzik worked on outreach in the Reform, Conservative and Orthodox communities for Clinton's campaign, including making inroads with women in the Hasidic community. He met with leaders in New York's Jewish communities, including the Bobovers Hasidic section.

Hiltzik teamed up with the British publicity company Freud Communications to start up their American branch in 2005. He became Katie Couric's publicist and spokesman shortly before her move from NBC to CBS in 2006.

He also advised Jose Antonio Vargas's DefineAmerican campaign to address immigration policy in the United States and pass the DREAM Act, and Thomas DiNapoli in his successful bid for New York State Comptroller. Hiltzik served on New York City Mayor Bill DeBlasio's 2014 Inaugural Committee. He also advised Reshma Saujani, founder of Girls Who Code, in her primary against Rep. Carolyn Maloney. Hiltzik advised political strategist Lis Smith on crisis management, and encouraged her to write a book about her experiences, which was published as Any Given Tuesday in 2022.

Hiltzik served as an 'optics consultant' for Jeffrey Epstein in the years leading up to his July 2019 re-arrest and death a month later in federal custody. He also spoke to Epstein about Harvey Weinsteins case, for whom he worked for years earlier. He also been in correspondence with Noam Chomsky in relation to Epstein case. Hiltzik responded that he never worked on managing publication of any story on Epstein and donated all Epstein-related earnings to unspecified charity.

In 2017, Hiltzik was listed on Sports Business Journal's "Power Players" list. In August 2021, Business Insider ranked Hiltzik as one of the top public relations people in crisis management, citing his experience working with high-profile clients like Brad Pitt, Eric Schmidt, Katie Couric and Kelly Ripa.

Hiltzik has represented a number of high-profile women including Hillary Clinton, Ivanka Trump, Nicole Shanahan, Couric, and Ripa.

He handled public relations pro bono for Darnella Frazier, the young woman whose recording of the murder of George Floyd helped to inspire protests against police brutality and played a key role in the conviction of Derek Chauvin.

Hiltzik's firm was engaged by attorneys to support litigation in the Johnny Depp trial, and Hiltzik provided communications support to Depp's legal team during his defamation case against Amber Heard. Hiltzik kept a low profile in the media in the aftermath of the trial.

Hiltzik coordinated publicity for the 80th Golden Globe Awards. In 2023, he was included on Crain’s New York Business list of the most notable leaders in public relations and The Observer's "PR Power List". He was part of a panel on echo chambers and polarization in media at the Cornell University College of Arts and Sciences on April 19, 2023.

The Observer listed Hiltzik Strategies as one of the top crisis and reputation management firms in 2024. The firm's alumni include Emily Feingold, head of communications at Netflix; Sarah Rothman, founder of The Lede; Melissa Nathan, founder of The Agency Group; Rachel Rosenzweig, communications director at Thrive Capital; Jeremy Watkins, head of communications for the New York Knicks and New York Rangers; Josh Raffel, a communications executive and former White House aide; Eliana Holm Yamshon, head of Global Head of Employer Brand at BlackRock; Eric Koch, founder of political strategy and communications firm Downfield Strategies; and Hope Hicks, chief operating officer of Devil May Care and former White House Communications Director.

Hiltzik was described as "a leading crisis manager" in a 2025 article from The New York Times, which cited his work with Alec Baldwin, Katie Couric, Kelly Ripa, Brad Pitt and Johnny Depp. He also represented baseball player Shohei Ohtani during the interpreter gambling scandal, and is the spokesperson for internet personality MrBeast.

Since the October 7 attacks in Israel, Hiltzik has worked with the families of missing Israeli hostages to bring about the return of hostages from Gaza. He worked with the family of murdered Israeli-American Omer Neutra for years as they sought the return of Neutra's remains. Omer Neutra's remains were returned to his family in Israel in November 2025.

== Film and print media ==
He was executive producer of the documentary films Documented, The Barn, the award-winning Paper Clips and Holy Land Hardball; and co-produced the documentary Connected. He is also a contributor to the Jewish magazine Tablet.

== Recognition and board memberships ==
In 2012 Hiltzik was honored by the New York Board of Rabbis for his work in the Jewish community.

In July 2015, he was the first public relations professional to be named to the board of directors of the New York City Economic Development Corporation, a not-for-profit corporation that promotes economic growth throughout New York City.

Hiltzik sits on the Board of the Ghetto Film School. In the summer of 2020, during the coronavirus pandemic, Hiltzik suggested that the school's film competition focus on the subject of connection during isolation and lockdown.

== Personal life ==
Hiltzik lives in New York City with his wife, Dana, and their three children.
