= Frank Bulcock =

Australian politician

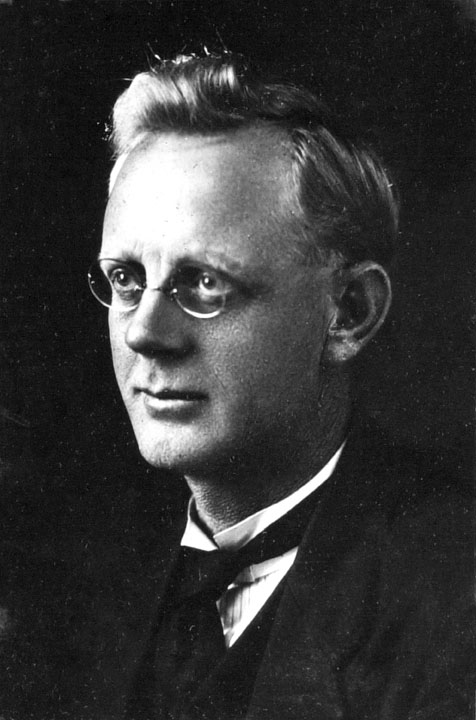

Member of the Queensland Legislative Assembly for Barcoo
- In office 20 December 1919 – 15 December 1942
- Preceded by: T. J. Ryan
- Succeeded by: Ned Davis

Personal details
- Born: Frank William Bulcock; 6 June 1892 Mount Arapiles, Victoria, Australia
- Died: 19 January 1973 (aged 80) Mount Nebo, Queensland, Australia
- Party: Labour Party
- Spouse: Florence Violet Edwards (m.1917 d.1974)
- Occupation: Veterinary Surgeon

Frank William Bulcock (6 June 1892 – 19 January 1973) was an Australian politician. He was a Member of the Queensland Legislative Assembly.

== Early life ==
Bulcock was born at Mount Arapiles, near Horsham, Victoria in 1892 to Thomas Bulcock and his wife Eliza Mackay (née Grove). After completing his schooling at local schools he studied veterinary science at Sydney Technical College and won a Department of Agriculture bursary to Wagga Wagga Experiment Farm. In 1914 Bulcock moved to Western Queensland and became involved with the Australian Workers' Union.

== Politics ==
In 1919, premier T. J. Ryan decided to enter federal politics and resigned as the member for Barcoo. Bulcock, representing the Labor Party, easily won the by-election over rival J.P. Boland and held the seat for the 23 years. During this time he was Secretary for Agriculture and Stock from 1932 till 1942 and in 1939 was a delegate on a South African study tour. Bulcock resigned from parliament in 1942 to take up a position with the federal government under Prime Minister, John Curtin.

=== Role in the release of the cane toad pest species ===
In 1935, cane toads were brought over from Hawaii, by Assistant Entomologist RW Mungomery, as an attempt to control the native grey-backed cane beetle (Dermolepida albohirtum) and French's beetle (Lepidiota frenchi). This was done despite Mungomery noting that they would not be effective. The retired NSW Government Entomologist Walter Froggatt opposed the toad releases, and successfully lobbied the Australian Department of Health to ban them in November 1935, writing "This giant toad, immune from enemies, omnivorous in its habits, and breeding all year round, may become as great a pest as the rabbit or cactus".

Then Minister for Agriculture and Stock, Bulcock was instrumental in convincing the Queensland premier William Forgan Smith to persuade the Prime Minister Joseph Lyons that the ban on the release of cane toads be overturned. The releases were therefore continued from September 1936, creating an ecological disaster that persists to this day while simultaneously failing to control the target cane beetle species.

== Federal Service ==
Bulcock was appointed as Commonwealth director-general of agriculture. In this position he organized the wartime planning of essential agricultural production and labor requirements. Following his resignation from this position he took up an appointment to the Scarce Commodities Committee which met in Washington, D.C., USA with responsibility for fertilisers, phosphate rock and sulphur.

== Personal life ==
On Christmas Day in 1917, Bulcock married Florence Violet Edwards in Sydney and together had two children. He retired in 1959 but continued to campaign for the Labor Party at election time. Bulcock died in 1973 at Mount Nebo, Queensland, and was cremated.

Parliament of Queensland
Preceded by T. J. Ryan	Member for Barcoo; 1919–1942	Succeeded by Ned Davis
