= Electoral district of Barcoo =

Former state electoral district of Queensland, Australia

Barcoo Queensland—Legislative Assembly
- State: Queensland
- Created: 1885
- Abolished: 1972
- Namesake: Barcoo River
- Demographic: Rural
- Coordinates: 28°29′S 137°46′E

Barcoo was an electoral district of the Legislative Assembly in the Australian state of Queensland from 1885 to 1972.

It was created in 1885, by dividing the district of Mitchell, with Barcoo taking up its western area. It was named after the Barcoo River, and covered remote rural areas in Southwest Queensland.

Barcoo was mostly a safe seat for the Labor Party

The death of Frank Murphy created a by-election on 5 March 1892. A shearer, Tommy Ryan (not to be confused with Premier T. J. Ryan), became the first endorsed Labor candidate in Queensland, and won the seat against opponent William Henry Campbell, the editor and proprietor of the local newspaper, The Western Champion.

The seat was later held by the Premier, T. J. Ryan. Remarkably, his win in 1909 was the last time a member was elected for the seat at a general election. All subsequent members were the victors in by-elections.

The electorate was abolished in the redistribution preceding the 1972 state election.

== Members for Barcoo ==
Member	Party	Term
Frank Reid Murphy		1885–1892
Tommy Ryan	Labour	1892–1893
George Kerr	Ministerialist	1893–1909
T. J. Ryan	Labor	1909–1919
Frank Bulcock	Labor	1919–1942
Ned Davis	Labor	1943–1961
Eugene O'Donnell	Labor	1961–1972

== See also ==
- Electoral districts of Queensland
- Members of the Queensland Legislative Assembly by year
- Category:Members of the Queensland Legislative Assembly by name
