= Electoral district of Peak Downs =

Peak Downs Queensland—Legislative Assembly
- State: Queensland
- Dates current: 1977–1992
- Namesake: Shire of Peak Downs

Peak Downs was an electoral district of the Legislative Assembly in the Australian state of Queensland from 1977 to 1992.

Based in inland Central Queensland, Peak Downs was created for the 1977 state election, essentially replacing the former district of Belyando. The district's first and only member was Vince Lester of the National Party. Peak Downs was abolished by the 1991 redistribution as a result of the one vote one value reforms. Its territory was split between the new seats of Charters Towers and Fitzroy as well as the pre-existing electorate of Gregory. Lester successfully switched to the coastal seat of Keppel.

== Members for Peak Downs ==
Member	Party	Term
Vince Lester	National	1977–1992

== See also ==
- Electoral districts of Queensland
- Members of the Queensland Legislative Assembly by year
- Category:Members of the Queensland Legislative Assembly by name
