= Abbey School, Rotherham =

Abbey School

Location
- Little Common Lane; Kimberworth; Rotherham, South Yorkshire, S61 2RA; England; 53.4363°N 1.4061°W

Information
- Type: Special school; Academy
- Motto: Inspire, Believe, Achieve
- Established: 1 September 1994
- Local authority: Rotherham
- Department for Education URN: 142768 Tables
- Ofsted: Reports
- Gender: Mixed
- Age: 7 to 16
- Enrolment: 56 as of May 2016
- Capacity: 61
- Website: abbeyschool.co

Abbey School is a mixed special school for children with moderate and complex learning difficulties. It is located in Kimberworth, South Yorkshire, England.

Abbey School was opened in September 1994, and was originally administered by Rotherham Metropolitan Borough Council. The school was converted to academy status in June 2016 and is now part of the Nexus Multi-Academy Trust. However the school continues to coordinate with Rotherham Metropolitan Borough Council for admissions.

== Ofsted inspections ==
Since opening in 1994, the school has undergone seven Ofsted inspections:

Date of inspection	Outcome	Reference
13–17 November 1995	???	
9–13 November 1998	Very good	
17–19 January 2005	Very good	
13–14 March 2008	Outstanding	
18–19 October 2011	Good	
30 September – 1 October 2014	Inadequate (special measures)	
24–25 May 2016	Good	
2019	Outstanding	
