= National Board of Review =

American film industry organization

National Board of Review of Motion Pictures
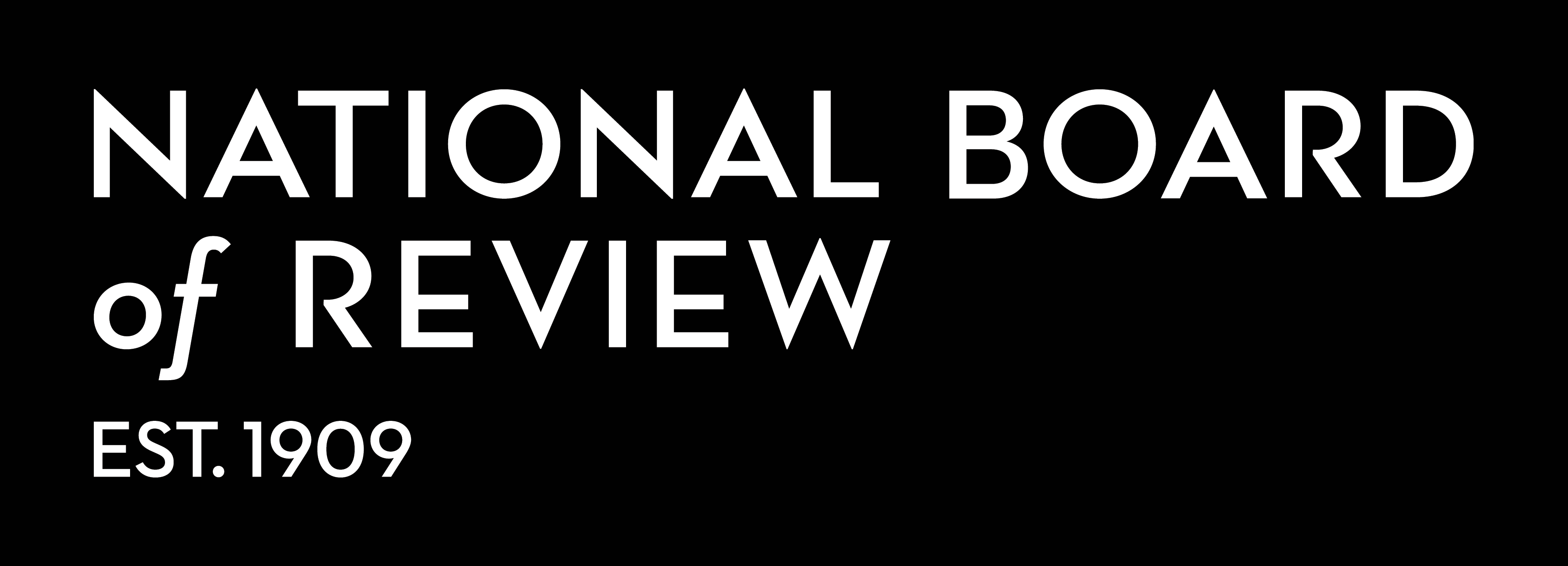
- Logo
- Abbreviation: NBR
- Formation: March 1909 as Board of Censorship of Motion Picture Programs
- Type: Film organization
- Headquarters: United States
- Location(s): 405 Lexington Avenue, 26th Floor; New York, NY 10174
- Website: nationalboardofreview.org

The National Board of Review of Motion Pictures (NBR) is a non-profit organization of New York City area film enthusiasts. Its awards, which are announced in early December, are considered the first major harbinger of the film awards season that culminates in the Academy Awards.

The organization originated in March 1909 as the Board of Censorship of Motion Picture Programs, a non-governmental agency launched to "white list" uncontroversial films for movie exhibitors. It evolved into the leading film censorship organization in the United States prior to the emergence of the Motion Picture Association of America in the middle-20th Century.

== History ==
=== Film censorship organization ===
The National Board of Review is a private organization of film enthusiasts tracing its origins to March 1909. In that year Columbia University professor Charles Sprague Smith, founder and managing director of a progressive era educational bureau called the People's Institute, working at the behest and in conjunction with the Exhibitors' Association of New York, launched the Board of Censorship of Motion Picture Programs to establish standards for a "white list" of sanctioned films.

The fledgling volunteer organization soon made its focus national, rebranding as the National Board of Motion Picture Censorship (NBMPC), becoming the unofficial clearinghouse for new movies.

One early participant in the New York City movie scene later remembered a single film as the impetus for forming the National Board. In the gold rush that was the first days of motion pictures "some very questionable subjects soon oozed from questionable sources" in the pursuit of audience thrills:

"The first picture to arouse a protest was of foreign manufacture. It was one which showed the backing of a horse attached to a wagon over a precipice, horse and wagon alternating in the terrible fall down the steep incline until both landed at the bottom. The supposed driver was, of course, a dummy, but the horse was flesh and blood. American agents, distributors, and exhibitors joined in condemnaton of the subject and it was at this time that the question of supervision was taken up."

As these first crude films were "only patronized by the poorer classes," including New York City's immigrant population, the social reformers of the People's Institute were seen as a natural center for external supervision of film content. For their part, exhibitors of the day were forced to rent their film subjects blind, yet they bore the brunt of legal sanctions should public morals vigilantes or local law enforcement be provoked. They sought the security of a safe list of films.

National Board of Censorship film title card, 1915

Within a few years the volunteer-based NBMPC was operating with a $15,000 budget, overseen by a general committee of 33 people and a national board of 150. Work groups of 5 members of the board would meet in the office of a New York City film maker to review multiple titles, either approving the movie uncut, forcing the deletion of controversial material, or rejecting the film altogether. Decisions of the board were appealable to review by a group of 10 members of the general committee. Coordinating the activities of the volunteer organization was a professional staff of 6.

Funding of the clerical staff was made possible through donations of film manufacturers and their trade organization. No member of the board, general committee, or organizational officer received financial compensation.

Scenes deemed excessively sexual, violent, blasphemous, or contributing to criminality could be ordered to be cut before certification was granted. In 1913 the NBMPC passed judgment on about 7,000 films and was responsible for the withdrawal of 53 movies and for forcing cuts in 401 others. Films passing muster were authorized to display the National Board of Censorship's seal and were listed in the weekly bulletin sent out to a mailing list of 400, said to control what was shown on the screens of 16,000 of the nation's 17,000 movie houses. Those attempting to show films not having run the censorship gauntlet frequently faced repression by local law enforcement authorities spurred by citizen complaints.

While the National Board of Censorship did intrude upon content, it was viewed by many in the motion picture industry as a less bad option to the hodge-podge of shrill and arbitrary state and local censorship bodies — some of which charged fees — or the prospect of draconian federal oversight. In January 1916 the editor of New York-based Moving Picture World, a trade weekly philosophically opposed to censorship, opined:

"In deciding to aid the National Board in its work, the producers have shown commendable wisdom. We realize, as does every other friend of the motion picture, that the work of the Board cannot be dispensed with for some time to come. We do urge the Board to take that word 'censors' and throw it into the river where the river is deepest and swiftest. It is a misnomer. The Board does not censor, it advises.... It suggests standards and discusses ethical as well as aesthetical points with directors and producers. It works constructively, while legalized censorship is merely an engine of graft and tyranny and never has benefited one single solitary human being except, of course, the men of the legalized boards, who are maintained out of the public treasury. The men in the National Board render their services gratuitously; they are interested in social welfare, they are representatives of civic and social bodies, and their work they offer up as a gift to society at large."

In March 1916 the NBMPC took the industry's advice dispensed with the word "censorship", changing the name of the organization to the National Board of Review of Motion Pictures.

Producers submitted their films to the board before making release prints; they agreed to cut any footage that the board found objectionable, up to and including destroying the entire film. Thousands of films carried the legend "Passed by the National Board of Review" in their main titles from 1916 into the 1950s, when the board began to lose financial support, partly due to the NBR being overshadowed by the Motion Picture Association of America regarding film censorship.

=== Film critics' association ===
Over time, the National Board of Review evolved from a film censorship organization to a film critics' association, formally recognizing excellence in the movies which they attempted to oversee.

In 1930, the NBR was the first group to choose the 10 best English-language movies of the year and the best foreign films, and is still the first critical body to announce its annual awards. In 1936 executive secretary Wilton A. Barrett explained the Board's workings:

The National Board is opposed to legal censorship regarding all forms of the motion picture...It believes that far more constructive ...is the method of selecting the better pictures, publishing descriptive, classified lists of them and building up audiences and support for them through the work of community groups...

== Publications ==
The NBR has also gained international acclaim for its publications, which collectively constitute the oldest film review and commentary publication in the US. Many back issues can now be viewed at the Media History Digital Library.

- Film Program (1917–1926)
- Exceptional Photoplays (1920–1925)
- Photoplay Guide to Better Movies (1924–1926)
- National Board of Review Magazine (1926–1942)
- New Movies (1942–1949)
- Films in Review (print: 1950–1997; online: 1997–present) ISSN 0015-1688

== Award categories ==
- Best Film + Top 10 Films
- Best Director
- Best Actor
- Best Actress
- Best Supporting Actor
- Best Supporting Actress
- Best Acting by an Ensemble
- Breakthrough Performance
- Best Adapted Screenplay
- Best Original Screenplay
- Best Animated Film
- Best Documentary Film
- Best International Film
- Spotlight Award
- Outstanding Achievement in Cinematography
- Best Family Film
- Top 5 Documentaries
- Best Directorial Debut
- Top 10 Independent Films
- NBR Freedom of Expression
- Special Filmmaking Achievement
- Top 5 International Films
- Special Achievement in Producing
- William K. Everson Film History Award
- Career Achievements in Production: Music, FX
- Best Acting (1937–1944, retired)

== See also ==
- Film censorship in the United States
- Hays Code
