= Joe Fab =

American film director

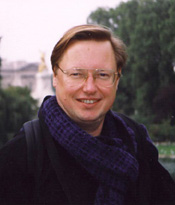
Fabiszewski in 2007

Joseph Edward Fabiszewski Jr. (October 4, 1951 - March 10, 2024), better known as "Joe Fab", was an American producer, writer and director.

== Career ==
Fabiszewski has produced, written and directed films and has worked in video production, media and communications, event production and the live presentation of plays and music. He received the 2006 Christopher Award from The Christophers organization. Also in 2006, William M. Campbell, president of Discovery Networks U.S., presented Fabiszewski with the Discovery and Imagination Award.

In 2007, Fabiszewski's film Paper Clips, the feature documentary about the Paper Clips Project, was screened at the American Independent Film Festival in Kuwait.

The U.S. Consulate in Chennai, India, again gave Fabiszewski the privilege of representing the United States as a special cultural envoy in 2008. He was a guest at both the International Film Festival of Kerala and the Chennai International Film Festival, where Paper Clips was screened. He conducted workshops with children rescued from the streets of India.

Fabiszewski produced, co-directed and wrote the feature documentary Bedford: The Town They Left Behind, released in 2009. The film won the GI Film Festival Award, it was also the recipient of the MovieGuide Faith and Freedom Award. He is also the co-director and co-producer of the documentary "Not The Last Butterfly". In 2021, his film “When My Time Comes,” featuring NPR's Diane Rehm, began airing on PBS.

== Personal ==
Fabiszewski's wife Kay Fab is a voice-over artist.
