= William Wellesley Campbell =

Guyanese physician later Catholic monk

William Wellesley Campbell (18??-1962) was a Guyanese physician who subsequently became a Catholic monk at Mount Saint Benedict in Trinidad and Tobago.

== In London ==
Campbell qualified with an MRCS and an LRCP at King's College, London in 1903. Whilst in London he worked as an anatomical demonstrator at King's College and as a clinical assistant in the Royal Eye Hospital. During this period he advised Theophilus Scholes as regards the first volume of Glimpses of the Ages. Having been thanked by Scholes in the preface, the Introduction to Volume II cites an anonymous reviewer who suggested that Campbell should have advised Scholes not to publish the first volume. Having described this reviewer as a delinquent "converting the noble edifice of criticism into the wigwam of lampoonery", Scholes discussed the publication of further volumes with Campbell. After expressing some ironic concern about the reviewers well-being, Scholes accepted Campbell's advice to continue, thanking him again in the preface.
