= William M. Campbell =

William (Billy) M. Campbell III was the president of Discovery Networks U.S. from May 2002 to 2007, in this role he was responsible for all aspects of the domestic television division, including programming, production, affiliate sales and marketing, advertising sales, consumer marketing, research, business development and communications.

== Biography ==
A native of Greenville, South Carolina, Campbell is a 1982 graduate of Harvard and a 1987 graduate of the Harvard Business School (M.B.A.). He was a Rotary International Scholar.

Among his most recent achievements, Campbell led efforts to recruit Ted Koppel to the Discovery Channel for a pioneering multiyear deal in which Koppel, a 42-year veteran of network broadcasting serves as managing editor for the network and will host and produce long-form programming exclusively for the Discovery Channel.

In 2005, Campbell oversaw the Discovery Channel team on the debut of its highest-rated program since 2000, “The Flight That Fought Back.” The special told the compelling story of the 33 passengers and seven crew members on United Airlines Flight 93. Campbell has overseen the debut of several other Discovery Channel signature hit series. The channel has also recently launched a host of programming that is breaking ground in new genres and formats, such as Deadliest Catch and Dirty Jobs. Campbell is currently guiding the TLC team in the development of more than 100 programs. Campbell helped launch FitTV (formerly The Health Network) in 2004, as well as the relaunch of Discovery Home Channel (formerly Discovery Home & Leisure Channel) and the transition of Discovery Wings Channel to Military Channel in January 2005, which has resulted in significant ratings increases for the network.

Prior to joining Discovery Networks, Campbell served from 1998 as president of Miramax Television, where he was responsible for all aspects of television, including development, marketing, legal affairs and production. Previously, Campbell was executive vice president, CBS Entertainment. Before joining CBS, Campbell served as senior vice president, drama development at Warner Bros. Television. Prior to joining ABC he worked as an analyst in the mergers and acquisitions department of Smith Barney, Harris Upham & Co. in New York.

During a management overhaul in February 2007, Discovery announced Campbell was leaving the company.

On January 15, 2009, Billy Campbell was seated in the second-to-last row of US Airways Flight 1549, which was ditched in New York's Hudson River with no casualties.
