= Tommy Ryan (politician) =

Australian politician

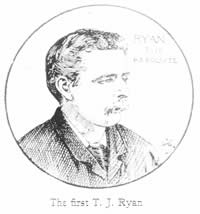

Member of the Legislative Assembly for Barcoo
- In office 5 March 1892 – 20 May 1893
- Preceded by: Frank Murphy
- Succeeded by: George Kerr

Personal details
- Born: Thomas Joseph Ryan; 1852 At sea off British Mauritian coast
- Died: Unknown
- Party: Labour
- Occupation: Pearl fisher, Shearer

Thomas Joseph Ryan (1852 – death unknown) was a member of the Queensland Legislative Assembly in Australia. He represented the seat of Barcoo from 1892 to 1893.

Ryan was from Fremantle in Western Australia, where he had been educated by the Christian Brothers. He first worked in the pearling industry, but moved to Cooktown, Queensland in 1876. He variously worked as a "packer, digger, shearer, butcher, fencer, drover and storekeeper". While shearing in Queensland, Ryan became involved in the nascent trade union movement, initially as shed representative. He subsequently worked as a union organiser after being refused employment due to his union activities, rising to become secretary of the Queensland Labourers' Union.

Ryan was secretary of the strike committee in the 1891 Australian shearers' strike, organising resistance at Barcaldine, Clermont and Winton. He was one of the leaders arrested and tried at Rockhampton, but unlike most of the leaders, was acquitted. He was elected to the Legislative Assembly at an 1892 by-election for the seat of Barcoo following the death of MP Frank Murphy, becoming one of the first Labor MPs in Australia with the support of the unions and the new Labor Party. However, he was disendorsed by the Labor Party for the 1893 election, retired from politics, and returned to being a shearer.

It is not known when Ryan died but a contemporary report in the Brisbane Worker believed him to be alive in May 1917.

Parliament of Queensland
Preceded by Frank Murphy	Member for Barcoo; 1892–1893	Succeeded by George Kerr
