= Paper Clips Project =

Monument commemorating Holocaust victims

A middle school project teaching tolerance in a small Tennessee city turned into a world-renowned memorial to the victims of the Holocaust. Poster from 2004 documentary film

The Paper Clips Project, by middle school students from the small southeastern Tennessee town of Whitwell, created a monument for the Holocaust victims of Nazi Germany. It started in 1998 as a simple 8th-grade project to study other cultures, and then evolved into one gaining worldwide attention. At last count, over 30 million paper clips had been received.

An award-winning documentary film about the project, Paper Clips, was released in 2004 by Miramax Films.

== Development ==
In 1998, Linda M. Hooper, principal of Whitwell Middle School in Whitwell, Tennessee, asked Assistant Principal David Smith to find a voluntary after-school project to teach the children about tolerance. David Smith and Sandra Roberts started a Holocaust education program and held the first class in the fall of 1998. Soon the students were overwhelmed with the massive scale of the Holocaust and asked Mrs. Hooper if they could collect something to represent the lives that were exterminated during the Holocaust. Mrs. Hooper responded that they could if they could find something that related to the Holocaust or to World War II. Through Internet research, David Smith discovered that Norwegians wore paperclips on their lapels during World War II as a silent protest against Nazi occupation. The students decided to collect 6,000,000 paper clips to represent the estimated 6,000,000 Jews killed between 1939 and 1945 under the authority of the Nazi government of Adolf Hitler.

== Paper clips ==
Paper clips were chosen in part because Norwegians wore them on their lapels as a symbol of resistance against Nazi occupation during World War II. The clips were meant to denote solidarity and unity ("we are bound together"); in Norwegian, paper clips are called binders.

== Monument ==
The Children's Holocaust Memorial consists of an authentic German transport car (which arrived in the Baltimore seaport on September 9, 2001) surrounded by a small garden. The railcar is filled with 11 million paper clips (6 million for murdered Jews and 5 million for Roma, Catholics, homosexuals, Jehovah's Witnesses, and other groups). The monument was unveiled on the anniversary of the Kristallnacht, November 9, 2001.

== Film ==
The 2004 documentary film Paper Clips was directed by Elliot Berlin and Joe Fab. It was made to describe the project and highlight what was done.

== See also ==
- United States Holocaust Memorial Museum
- List of Holocaust films
- Whitwell, Tennessee
- Rome Film Festival
- Paper Clips (2004) on IMDb
