= Eugene O'Donnell =

Australian politician

Member of the Queensland Legislative Assembly for Barcoo
- In office 1 July 1961 – 27 May 1972
- Preceded by: Ned Davis
- Succeeded by: Seat abolished

Member of the Queensland Legislative Assembly for Belyando
- In office 27 May 1972 – 7 December 1974
- Preceded by: New seat
- Succeeded by: Vince Lester

Personal details
- Born: Eugene Christopher O'Donnell; 28 November 1913 Bathurst, New South Wales, Australia
- Died: 16 August 1982 (aged 68) Brisbane, Queensland, Australia
- Party: Labor
- Spouse: Emily Conlon (m.1936)
- Occupation: School teacher

Eugene Christopher O'Donnell (28 November 1913 - 16 August 1982) was a member of the Queensland Legislative Assembly.

== Biography ==
O'Donnell was born in Bathurst, New South Wales, the son of Michael Patrick O'Donnell and his wife Mary (née Scanlon). He was educated at St Laurence's College in Brisbane before attending the Brisbane Teachers College. He was then posted to various schools around southern and central Queensland as a teacher and school principal.

On The 10 Aug 1936 O'Donnell married Emily Conlon and together had a son and a daughter. He died in Brisbane in August 1982 and was cremated at the Mt Thompson Crematorium.

== Public career ==
O'Donnell won the 1961 by-election for the seat of Barcoo in the Queensland Legislative Assembly to replace Ned Davis, who had died in April of that year. He represented the electorate until 1972 when Barcoo was abolished. He then won the re-established seat of Belyando and retired in 1974.

Parliament of Queensland
Preceded by Ned Davis	Member for Barcoo; 1961–1972	Abolished
New seat	Member for Belyando; 1972–1974	Succeeded by Vince Lester
