= William Joseph Campbell (meteorologist) =

American meteorologist

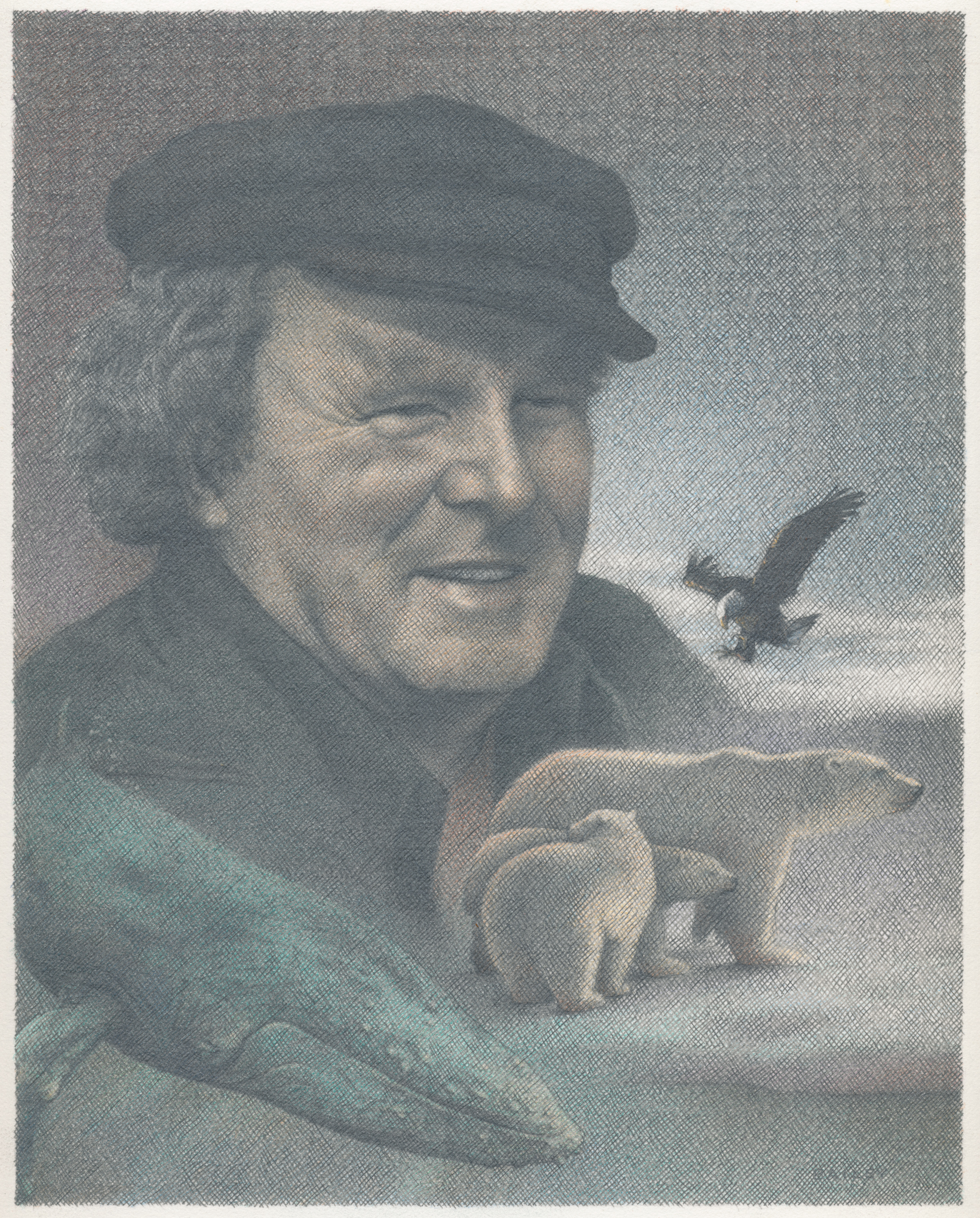
- Commemorative drawing of William J. Campbell by artist Scott Bailey
- Born: May 1, 1930; Brooklyn, New York
- Died: November 20, 1992 (aged 62); Gig Harbor, Washington
- Education: University of Washington
- Known for: Climate; Polar regions of Earth; Sea ice
- Scientific career
- Fields: Meteorology
- Workplaces: United States Geological Survey

William Joseph Campbell (May 1, 1930 – November 20, 1992) was a ranking meteorologist for the United States Geological Survey. He was a pioneer of the remote sensing of the polar regions and an expert on polar ice.

William devoted his career to investigating and developing the use of aircraft and satellite remote sensing methods to study the interrelationships of polar ice caps, glaciers, sea ice, ice sheets, and snow packs to climate and the hydrological cycle.

== Early life and education ==
William Joseph and his twin brother Richard Arthur were born to Dorothy Regan T. Campbell and William J. Campbell on May 1, 1930, in Brooklyn, New York. William and his twin brother grew up in a rough neighborhood during the Great Depression and graduated from Brooklyn Technical High School.

William earned a B.S. at the University of Alaska and an M.S. and a Ph.D. from the atmospheric department at the University of Washington. He was the recipient of a Fulbright Scholarship to University of Cambridge in England from 1960 to 1961.

== Career and research ==
In 1964, William J. Campbell joined the U.S. Geological Survey (USGS), a branch of the Department of the Interior, as a member of a team studying sea-ice and glacier dynamics. In 1969, he was appointed chief of the agency's Ice Dynamics Research Project, a research group based at the University of Puget Sound in Tacoma, Washington, where he was a professor in the Department of Physics.

William J. Campbell taught several years at Dartmouth College in New Hampshire and during his career he lectured and taught at many American and foreign universities, including those in England, Norway, France, Germany, Austria, Russia, Japan, Australia, and China. Throughout his life, William J. Campbell was an advocate of international cooperation between the world's scientists, especially the geophysicists.

At the end of the 1960's with his colleague Wilford F. Weeks, William J. Campbell published an appraisal on using icebergs as a fresh water source. The idea of towing large tabular Antarctic icebergs thousands of miles to arid coasts became immediately popular. The Saudis funded French engineers at the CICERO company to study the feasibility of bringing Antarctic tabular icebergs to Saudi Arabia.

William J. Campbell authored and co-authored more than 130 research papers and was widely sought as an expert on sea-ice dynamics and polar remote sensing.

== Polar exploration, research and observations ==
During his graduate work, William studied ice physics, and he took part in the International Geophysical Year. He spent 15 months drifting in the Arctic Ocean on the ice island Alpha, he was a member of the first research team to dive under the arctic ice pack and survived a plane crash in Alaska. In 1962 and 1963, he participated in two traverses of Antarctica and survived another plane crash near the South Pole.

His interest in polar research led him to both the Arctic and Antarctic regions to conduct research on 11 expeditions. Campbell Hills (Antarctica), 8 km west south west of Cape Lyttelton on the south side of Nimrod Glacier, was named in recognition of his Antarctic work.

== Remote sensing of the cryosphere ==
Before the satellite era, sea ice was one of the least understood variables in Earth's climate system. Knowing firsthand the difficulties of doing physical work and research in the remote, vast, and hazardous environment of the polar regions, William pioneered the use of remote sensing techniques to observe the cryosphere. Since the polar regions are dark six months of the year and largely cloud covered, using the visible light was not suitable for monitoring the polar regions. He demonstrated and promoted the use of satellite microwave instruments to acquire global coverage of the Polar Regions during all weather conditions and periods of darkness.

The first satellite passive-microwave atlases of the Polar Regions published by NASA in the 1980-90s represented a culmination point of William's work that started during the IGY in 1957–58 and was followed with the 1970s AIDJEX, BESEX, POLEX, NORSEX international experiments that provided ground and airborne surface truth to continuously observe the Polar Regions globally. The goal of establishing how to measure and record the changing extent of sea ice in both Polar Regions was largely accomplished by the end of the 1980s. In the following years, thanks to this work it became clear that sea ice in the Arctic was undergoing fundamental changes linked to climate change.

== International cooperation ==
William J. Campbell was instrumental in the development of interagency and international remote-sensing experiments of the polar ice regions and was a member and director of several international large-scale projects in that field.

Throughout his career he represented USGS at numerous national and international symposia and scientific meetings. He was actively involved in the protection and preservation of the global environment giving regular lectures to students and environmental groups.

William J. Campbell played a major role in coordinating remote sensing and surface measurements for several major international sea ice experiments. These experiments involved the use of drifting stations, ships and remote sensing aircraft and satellites. These experiments include:

- the Arctic Ice Dynamics Joint Experiment (AIDJEX)
- the joint U.S./U.S.S.R. Bering Sea Ice Experiment (BESEX)
- the Polar Experiment (POLEX)
- the SKYLAB Snow and Ice Experiment
- the Norwegian Remote Sensing Experiment (NORSEX)
- the international Marginal Ice Zone Experiments (MIZEX)
- the international Seasonal Ice Zone Experiments (SIZEX)

In 1970, after participating in the International Union of Geodesy and Geophysics (IUGG) in Moscow, USSR, he hitchhiked by himself into the villages and collective farms around Moscow and found the USSR an "intensely friendly country". "The more the Russians and the Americans can visit, the better off the world will be. People, who eat, drink and love together, don't make war".

== Awards ==
- Antarctic Service Medal (1965)
- Soviet Arctic Medal (1974)
- Meritorious Service Award (1985)
- William Thomas Pecora Medal for Remote Sensing of the Environment (1988)
- University of Puget Sound honorary member of the Phi Beta Kappa Society (1990)
- Inaugural Fridtjof Nansen Polar Bear Award (1991)
- Honorary Doctor of Science University of Puget Sound (1992)
