= Frank Reid Murphy =

Australian politician

Frank Murphy
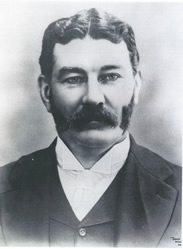

Member of the Queensland Legislative Assembly for Barcoo
- In office 24 November 1885 – 24 January 1892
- Preceded by: New seat
- Succeeded by: Tommy Ryan

Personal details
- Born: Frank Reid Murphy; 27 March 1844 Jaewah Station Colony of New South Wales
- Died: 24 January 1892 (aged 47) Rockhampton, Queensland, Australia
- Resting place: Rockhampton General Cemetery
- Spouse: Isabella Power (m.1873)
- Occupation: Grazier

Francis Reid Murphy (27 March 1844 – 24 January 1892) was a Member of the Queensland Legislative Assembly. He represented the seat of Barcoo from 1885 to 1892.

Murphy was the eldest son of Sir Francis Murphy (1809–1891). His eldest son was Major Francis Power Murphy.

Murphy died in office in 1892 and was buried in Rockhampton General Cemetery.

Parliament of Queensland
New seat	Member for Barcoo; 1885–1892	Succeeded by Tommy Ryan
