= Vince Lester =

Australian politician

The Honourable Vince Lester OAM JP

Member of the Queensland Legislative Assembly for Belyando
- In office 7 December 1974 – 12 November 1977
- Preceded by: Eugene O'Donnell
- Succeeded by: Seat abolished

Member of the Queensland Legislative Assembly for Peak Downs
- In office 12 November 1977 – 19 September 1992
- Preceded by: New seat
- Succeeded by: Seat abolished

Member of the Queensland Legislative Assembly for Keppel
- In office 19 September 1992 – 7 February 2004
- Preceded by: New seat
- Succeeded by: Paul Hoolihan

Personal details
- Born: Vincent Patrick Lester; 28 July 1939 Charleville, Queensland, Australia
- Died: 17 August 2026 (aged 87)
- Party: National Party
- Occupation: Baker

Vincent Patrick Lester OAM (28 July 1939 – 17 August 2026) was an Australian politician.

He was a National Party member of the Legislative Assembly of Queensland from 1974 to 2004, representing in succession the electorates of Belyando, Peak Downs and then Keppel.

He served as a minister in several National Party governments throughout his career, having first been promoted in 1983 as part of Sir Joh Bjelke-Petersen's cabinet. Over the following six years, he served variously as Minister for Employment, Training, Small Business, Consumer Affairs, Industrial Affairs and Police.

== Early life ==
Lester's father, who managed a cattle station near Quilpie, died when Lester was a young boy. Lester's mother than moved to Toowoomba where she rented a flat and found work as a barmaid.

At the age of 18, Lester commenced an apprenticeship as a baker. Upon completing his apprenticeship, he managed a one-man bakery in the Central Queensland township of Duaringa where he stayed for two years. After that bakery prospered, Lester relocated to Clermont in the Central Highlands where he managed a bakery which employed seven men.

== Political career ==
While in Clermont, Lester was elected to Belyando Shire Council in 1969 where he served four years as a local councillor. At the 1974 Queensland state election, Lester successfully contested the seat of Belyando following the retirement of Labor's Eugene O'Donnell. Lester defeated Labor candidate James Turner with an 8.7% swing towards the National Party.

When the seat of Belyando was abolished, Lester successfully contested the new seat of Peak Downs at the 1977 Queensland state election, defeating Labor candidate Leonard Nicholson.

In 1989, there were calls for Lester's resignation from the leaders of both the Liberal and Labor Party, Angus Innes and Wayne Goss after Lester was quoted as saying the Fitzgerald Inquiry could "go to buggery" during a visit to Blackall. Goss urged premier Russell Cooper to immediately sack Lester, stating: “Surely even Mr Cooper cannot retain a police minister who has expressed such an outrageous sentiment against the Fitzgerald Report”. However, Lester argues he had merely been referencing Tony Fitzgerald’s suggestion that the number of police officers be reduced from rural areas to boost numbers in cities with higher crime rates.

When the seat of Peak Downs was also abolished, Lester successfully contested the seat of Keppel on the Capricorn Coast, narrowly beating Labor candidate Robert Schwarten at the 1992 Queensland state election with Lester winning on preferences despite Schwarten receiving more primary votes.

Throughout his career, Lester became known for being outspoken on numerous issues.

After entering state parliament, Lester agitated for new building regulations in Queensland which would ensure doors to toilet cubicles in new buildings could swing outwards instead of inwards. Lester argued that this would make it easier for those who needed urgent medical attention to receive help without rescuers being hindered by the lack of easy access.

In 1979, Lester called on the Queensland welfare minister Sam Doumany to ban a Nestlé Nesquik "Captain Quik" space wargame, with Lester claiming the game could potentially lead to violence amongst children, spraying poisons and conducting operations.

In 1994, Lester advocated for the introduction of flogging as a form of corporal punishment for those convicted of assault, rape and burglary. Lester's proposal was criticised by Queensland's Civil Liberties Council with vice-president Terry O'Gorman accusing Lester of taking a superficial approach to the issue of crime.

Lester also advocated for tax incentives for those people wanting to quit smoking. He wrote to federal health minister Graham Richardson advocating for the federal government to add the cost of anti-smoking incentives to the national health scheme. Lester also suggested pensioners be provided with anti-smoking aids such as nicotine gum.

Lester also campaigned for the introduction of reflective number plates on vehicles and for the installation of air bags as a standard safety feature in cars, criticising the apparent reluctance of Australian car manufacturers due to the associated expense.

=== Walking backwards ===
One of Lester's most memorable feats during his time as a state MP was his achievement in 1977 of walking 24 kilometres backwards to raise money for Clermont's local rugby league club which was struggling financially. Lester had become aware of the club's plight after attending a meeting with the intention of obtaining the money the club owed his bakery.

In 1991, he once again walked backwards completing an 18-kilometre walk from Yeppoon to Emu Park as a fundraising activity to oppose a court action brought against Livingstone Shire Council by a developer hoping to establish a hard rock quarry at Emu Park. On this occasion, Lester raised $1000 for the Emu Park Preservation Society.

== Post politics ==
Following his retirement from parliament Lester was employed as a political advisor on the staff of Senator Ron Boswell, a senator for Queensland.

== Recognition ==
Lester received a Centenary Medal on 1 January 2001 for "service to Australian society through parliament". He was awarded the Medal of the Order of Australia (OAM) in the 2006 Australia Day Honours for "service to the community through the Queensland Parliament and to local government".

In 2018, Lester was presented with a Distinguished Service Award in recognition of his extensive community service including 50 years with Rotary International.

The Vince Lester Bridge in Emerald and Vince Lester Walking Circuit in Rockhampton are named in Lester's honour.

== Personal life and death ==
As of March 2026, Lester had been married to his wife Mary for 62 years.

Lester died in Toowoomba on 17 August 2026, aged 87. His death prompted various community members to share tributes, celebrating Lester's legacy.

Lester’s funeral was held at St Thomas More’s Catholic Parish in Toowoomba on 28 August 2026, which commenced with a requiem mass.

Parliament of Queensland
Preceded by Eugene O'Donnell	Member for Belyando; 1974–1977	Abolished
New seat	Member for Peak Downs; 1977–1992	Abolished
New seat	Member for Keppel; 1992–2004	Succeeded by Paul Hoolihan
