= Results of the 1953 Queensland state election =

Queensland state election, 7 March 1953 Legislative Assembly << 1950–1956 >>
| Enrolled voters | 657,349^{[1]} | | | | |
| Votes cast | 616,611 | | Turnout | 93.80 | +1.29 |
| Informal votes | 7,912 | | Informal | 1.28 | +0.17 |
Summary of votes by party
| Party | Primary votes | % | Swing | Seats | Change |
| Labor | 323,882 | 53.21% | +6.34 | 50 | +8 |
| Liberal | 129,633 | 21.30% | –8.61 | 8 | –3 |
| Country | 114,124 | 18.75% | –0.50 | 15 | –5 |
| North Queensland Labor | 6,680 | 1.10% | –0.12 | 1 | ±0 |
| Social Credit | 4,103 | 0.67% | +0.67 | 0 | ±0 |
| Communist | 3,948 | 0.65% | +0.28 | 0 | ±0 |
| Ind. Labor | 824 | 0.13% | –0.42 | 0 | ±0 |
| Independent | 25,505 | 4.19% | +2.90 | 1 | ±0 |
| Total | 608,699 | | | 75 | |

This is a list of electoral district results for the 1953 Queensland state election.

== Results by electoral district ==
=== Aubigny ===
1953 Queensland state election: Aubigny
| Party | Candidate | Votes | % | ±% |
|---|---|---|---|---|
| Country | Jim Sparkes | 5,240 | 59.3 | −14.3 |
| Independent | Vic Sullivan | 3,601 | 40.7 | +40.7 |
| Total formal votes | | 8,841 | 99.1 | −0.4 |
| Informal votes | | 78 | 0.9 | +0.4 |
| Turnout | | 8,919 | 95.0 | +1.8 |
| Country hold | | Swing | N/A | |

=== Balonne ===
1953 Queensland state election: Balonne
| Party | Candidate | Votes | % | ±% |
|---|---|---|---|---|
| Labor | John Taylor | 2,600 | 61.2 | +7.3 |
| Country | Claude Dunshea | 1,650 | 38.8 | −7.3 |
| Total formal votes | | 4,250 | 99.1 | +0.1 |
| Informal votes | | 38 | 0.9 | −0.1 |
| Turnout | | 4,288 | 85.4 | −2.0 |
| Labor hold | | Swing | +7.3 | |

=== Barambah ===
1953 Queensland state election: Barambah
| Party | Candidate | Votes | % | ±% |
|---|---|---|---|---|
| Country | Joh Bjelke-Petersen | unopposed | | |
| Country hold | | Swing | | |

=== Barcoo ===
1953 Queensland state election: Barcoo
| Party | Candidate | Votes | % | ±% |
|---|---|---|---|---|
| Labor | Ned Davis | unopposed | | |
| Labor hold | | Swing | | |

=== Baroona ===
1953 Queensland state election: Baroona
| Party | Candidate | Votes | % | ±% |
|---|---|---|---|---|
| Labor | Bill Power | unopposed | | |
| Labor hold | | Swing | | |

=== Belyando ===
1953 Queensland state election: Belyando
| Party | Candidate | Votes | % | ±% |
|---|---|---|---|---|
| Labor | Tom Foley | unopposed | | |
| Labor hold | | Swing | | |

=== Bremer ===
1953 Queensland state election: Bremer
| Party | Candidate | Votes | % | ±% |
|---|---|---|---|---|
| Labor | Jim Donald | unopposed | | |
| Labor hold | | Swing | | |

=== Brisbane ===
1953 Queensland state election: Brisbane
| Party | Candidate | Votes | % | ±% |
|---|---|---|---|---|
| Labor | Johnno Mann | 6,239 | 75.2 | +16.4 |
| Social Credit | Colin Nonmus | 1,598 | 19.3 | +19.3 |
| Communist | Laura Hansen | 457 | 5.5 | +5.5 |
| Total formal votes | | 8,294 | 95.3 | −3.4 |
| Informal votes | | 407 | 4.7 | +3.4 |
| Turnout | | 8,701 | 89.5 | +0.4 |
| Labor hold | | Swing | N/A | |

=== Bulimba ===
1953 Queensland state election: Bulimba
| Party | Candidate | Votes | % | ±% |
|---|---|---|---|---|
| Labor | Bob Gardner | 7,938 | 64.0 | +28.3 |
| Liberal | Ronald Holt | 4,464 | 36.0 | +0.7 |
| Total formal votes | | 12,402 | 98.5 | −0.3 |
| Informal votes | | 193 | 1.5 | +0.3 |
| Turnout | | 12,595 | 95.7 | +1.4 |
| Labor hold | | Swing | +13.7 | |

=== Bundaberg ===
1953 Queensland state election: Bundaberg
| Party | Candidate | Votes | % | ±% |
|---|---|---|---|---|
| Labor | Ted Walsh | 6,513 | 65.6 | +21.0 |
| Liberal | Willie Howard | 2,865 | 28.9 | +3.1 |
| Independent | James Julin | 549 | 5.5 | +5.5 |
| Total formal votes | | 9,927 | 99.3 | +1.7 |
| Informal votes | | 67 | 0.7 | −1.7 |
| Turnout | | 9,994 | 94.5 | −1.0 |
| Labor hold | | Swing | +6.0 | |

=== Buranda ===
1953 Queensland state election: Buranda
| Party | Candidate | Votes | % | ±% |
|---|---|---|---|---|
| Labor | Dick Brown | 6,117 | 63.5 | +10.5 |
| Liberal | Cecil Holt | 3,523 | 36.5 | −10.5 |
| Total formal votes | | 9,640 | 98.9 | −0.2 |
| Informal votes | | 110 | 1.1 | +0.2 |
| Turnout | | 9,750 | 94.3 | −0.1 |
| Labor hold | | Swing | +10.5 | |

=== Burdekin ===
1953 Queensland state election: Burdekin
| Party | Candidate | Votes | % | ±% |
|---|---|---|---|---|
| Independent | Arthur Coburn | 4,337 | 58.0 | +5.5 |
| Labor | William Wall | 3,137 | 42.0 | −2.0 |
| Total formal votes | | 7,474 | 98.6 | −0.5 |
| Informal votes | | 107 | 1.4 | +0.5 |
| Turnout | | 7,581 | 96.1 | +4.5 |
| Independent hold | | Swing | +3.6 | |

=== Cairns ===
1953 Queensland state election: Cairns
| Party | Candidate | Votes | % | ±% |
|---|---|---|---|---|
| Labor | Thomas Crowley | 4,546 | 59.6 | +0.5 |
| Country | Arthur Keller | 2,389 | 31.3 | −9.6 |
| Protestant Labour | Charles Crawley | 406 | 5.5 | +5.5 |
| Communist | Cedric Dyer | 292 | 3.6 | +3.6 |
| Total formal votes | | 7,633 | 98.6 | −0.2 |
| Informal votes | | 108 | 1.4 | +0.2 |
| Turnout | | 7,741 | 90.6 | +3.2 |
| Labor hold | | Swing | +6.5 | |

=== Callide ===
1953 Queensland state election: Callide
| Party | Candidate | Votes | % | ±% |
|---|---|---|---|---|
| Country | Vince Jones | 5,988 | 63.9 | −1.9 |
| Labor | Patrick Moore | 3,386 | 36.1 | +1.9 |
| Total formal votes | | 9,374 | 97.1 | 0.0 |
| Informal votes | | 281 | 2.9 | 0.0 |
| Turnout | | 9,655 | 96.9 | +2.2 |
| Country hold | | Swing | −1.9 | |

=== Carnarvon ===
1953 Queensland state election: Carnarvon
| Party | Candidate | Votes | % | ±% |
|---|---|---|---|---|
| Labor | Paul Hilton | 5,625 | 61.4 | +10.6 |
| Country | Eric McCorkell | 3,537 | 38.6 | −10.6 |
| Total formal votes | | 9,162 | 98.8 | −0.5 |
| Informal votes | | 108 | 1.2 | +0.5 |
| Turnout | | 9,270 | 92.1 | +1.9 |
| Labor hold | | Swing | +10.6 | |

=== Carpentaria ===
1953 Queensland state election: Carpentaria
| Party | Candidate | Votes | % | ±% |
|---|---|---|---|---|
| Labor | Norm Smith | 3,093 | 62.7 | −0.2 |
| Country | William Aplin | 1,842 | 37.3 | +5.8 |
| Total formal votes | | 4,935 | 99.1 | +0.5 |
| Informal votes | | 47 | 0.9 | −0.5 |
| Turnout | | 4,982 | 84.2 | +3.5 |
| Labor hold | | Swing | −3.9 | |

=== Charters Towers ===
1953 Queensland state election: Charters Towers
| Party | Candidate | Votes | % | ±% |
|---|---|---|---|---|
| Labor | Arthur Jones | unopposed | | |
| Labor hold | | Swing | | |

=== Chermside ===
1953 Queensland state election: Chermside
| Party | Candidate | Votes | % | ±% |
|---|---|---|---|---|
| Liberal | Alex Dewar | 7,306 | 51.6 | −8.5 |
| Labor | Kenneth McRae | 6,844 | 48.4 | +8.5 |
| Total formal votes | | 14,150 | 99.2 | +0.5 |
| Informal votes | | 116 | 0.8 | −0.5 |
| Turnout | | 14,266 | 95.0 | +0.6 |
| Liberal hold | | Swing | −8.5 | |

=== Clayfield ===
1953 Queensland state election: Clayfield
| Party | Candidate | Votes | % | ±% |
|---|---|---|---|---|
| Liberal | Harold Taylor | unopposed | | |
| Liberal hold | | Swing | | |

=== Condamine ===
1953 Queensland state election: Condamine
| Party | Candidate | Votes | % | ±% |
|---|---|---|---|---|
| Labor | Les Diplock | 5,074 | 50.5 | +12.6 |
| Country | Eric Allpass | 4,975 | 49.5 | −12.6 |
| Total formal votes | | 10,049 | 99.5 | +0.1 |
| Informal votes | | 53 | 0.5 | −0.1 |
| Turnout | | 10,102 | 93.2 | +2.3 |
| Labor gain from Country | | Swing | +12.6 | |

=== Cook ===
1953 Queensland state election: Cook
| Party | Candidate | Votes | % | ±% |
|---|---|---|---|---|
| Labor | Bunny Adair | 4,135 | 53.1 | +3.9 |
| Country | Carlisle Wordsworth | 3,658 | 46.9 | −3.9 |
| Total formal votes | | 7,793 | 98.8 | −0.1 |
| Informal votes | | 93 | 1.2 | +0.1 |
| Turnout | | 7,886 | 89.8 | +1.6 |
| Labor gain from Country | | Swing | +3.9 | |

=== Cooroora ===
1953 Queensland state election: Cooroora
| Party | Candidate | Votes | % | ±% |
|---|---|---|---|---|
| Country | David Low | 6,359 | 70.1 | −2.5 |
| Labor | Geoffrey Arnell | 2,713 | 29.9 | +2.5 |
| Total formal votes | | 9,072 | 99.3 | +0.1 |
| Informal votes | | 67 | 0.7 | −0.1 |
| Turnout | | 9,139 | 94.6 | +2.4 |
| Country hold | | Swing | −2.5 | |

=== Coorparoo ===
1953 Queensland state election: Coorparoo
| Party | Candidate | Votes | % | ±% |
|---|---|---|---|---|
| Liberal | Thomas Hiley | 6,722 | 57.5 | −5.5 |
| Labor | Gerald Maher | 4,970 | 42.5 | +5.5 |
| Total formal votes | | 11,692 | 99.1 | +0.1 |
| Informal votes | | 110 | 0.9 | −0.1 |
| Turnout | | 11,802 | 94.0 | +0.7 |
| Liberal hold | | Swing | −5.5 | |

=== Cunningham ===
1953 Queensland state election: Cunningham
| Party | Candidate | Votes | % | ±% |
|---|---|---|---|---|
| Country | Alan Fletcher | 5,944 | 60.9 | −39.1 |
| Labor | Robert Bradfield | 3,808 | 39.1 | +39.1 |
| Total formal votes | | 9,752 | 99.2 | |
| Informal votes | | 78 | 0.8 | |
| Turnout | | 9,830 | 93.2 | |
| Country hold | | Swing | N/A | |

=== Darlington ===
1953 Queensland state election: Darlington
| Party | Candidate | Votes | % | ±% |
|---|---|---|---|---|
| Country | Tom Plunkett | 6,507 | 66.6 | −33.4 |
| Labor | Charles Knoll | 2,998 | 30.7 | +30.7 |
| Communist | William Yarrow | 270 | 2.8 | +2.8 |
| Total formal votes | | 9,775 | 96.9 | |
| Informal votes | | 314 | 3.1 | |
| Turnout | | 10,089 | 93.3 | |
| Country hold | | Swing | N/A | |

=== Fassifern ===
1953 Queensland state election: Fassifern
| Party | Candidate | Votes | % | ±% |
|---|---|---|---|---|
| Country | Alf Muller | 5,954 | 68.1 | −8.1 |
| Independent | Oliver Hooper | 2,791 | 31.9 | +31.9 |
| Total formal votes | | 8,745 | 98.9 | −0.4 |
| Informal votes | | 101 | 1.1 | +0.4 |
| Turnout | | 8,846 | 94.3 | +0.4 |
| Country hold | | Swing | N/A | |

=== Fitzroy ===
1953 Queensland state election: Fitzroy
| Party | Candidate | Votes | % | ±% |
|---|---|---|---|---|
| Labor | Jim Clark | 6,028 | 69.5 | +7.6 |
| Liberal | William Hoare | 2,490 | 28.7 | −9.4 |
| Communist | Eric Browne | 157 | 1.8 | +1.8 |
| Total formal votes | | 8,675 | 99.1 | +0.1 |
| Informal votes | | 78 | 0.9 | −0.1 |
| Turnout | | 8,753 | 95.0 | +1.8 |
| Labor hold | | Swing | +8.9 | |

=== Flinders ===
1953 Queensland state election: Flinders
| Party | Candidate | Votes | % | ±% |
|---|---|---|---|---|
| Labor | Ernest Riordan | unopposed | | |
| Labor hold | | Swing | | |

==== By-election ====
- This by-election was caused by the death of Ernest Riordan. It was held on 12 March 1955.

1955 Flinders state by-election
| Party | Candidate | Votes | % | ±% |
|---|---|---|---|---|
| Labor | Frank Forde | 1,176 | 46.0 | −54.0 |
| Country | Bill Longeran | 864 | 33.8 | +33.8 |
| Independent Labor | Charles Corney | 519 | 20.3 | +20.3 |
| Total formal votes | | 2,559 | 98.9 | |
| Informal votes | | 28 | 1.1 | |
| Turnout | | 2,587 | 57.6 | |
| Labor hold | | Swing | N/A | |

=== Fortitude Valley ===
1953 Queensland state election: Fortitude Valley
| Party | Candidate | Votes | % | ±% |
|---|---|---|---|---|
| Labor | Mick Brosnan | 6,718 | 72.1 | +14.5 |
| Social Credit | John Marion | 2,156 | 23.2 | +23.2 |
| Communist | Albert Graham | 438 | 4.7 | +1.6 |
| Total formal votes | | 9,312 | 97.0 | +1.4 |
| Informal votes | | 291 | 3.0 | −1.4 |
| Turnout | | 9,603 | 91.8 | −0.4 |
| Labor hold | | Swing | N/A | |

=== Gregory ===
1953 Queensland state election: Gregory
| Party | Candidate | Votes | % | ±% |
|---|---|---|---|---|
| Labor | George Devries | unopposed | | |
| Labor hold | | Swing | | |

=== Haughton ===
1953 Queensland state election: Haughton
| Party | Candidate | Votes | % | ±% |
|---|---|---|---|---|
| Labor | Colin McCathie | 4,617 | 59.2 | +12.3 |
| Country | Frederick Purdie | 1,661 | 21.3 | +21.3 |
| NQ Labor | Ernest O'Brien | 1,526 | 19.6 | 0.0 |
| Total formal votes | | 7,804 | 99.4 | +1.4 |
| Informal votes | | 46 | 0.6 | −1.4 |
| Turnout | | 7,850 | 96.3 | +3.3 |
| Labor hold | | Swing | +13.7 | |

=== Hinchinbrook ===
1953 Queensland state election: Hinchinbrook
| Party | Candidate | Votes | % | ±% |
|---|---|---|---|---|
| Labor | Cecil Jesson | 4,494 | 59.3 | +3.3 |
| Liberal | James Ryan | 1,549 | 20.4 | −23.7 |
| Independent | Douglas Jeffrey | 1,534 | 20.2 | +20.2 |
| Total formal votes | | 7,577 | 98.2 | +0.1 |
| Informal votes | | 139 | 1.8 | −0.1 |
| Turnout | | 7,716 | 92.0 | +1.9 |
| Labor hold | | Swing | +18.4 | |

=== Ipswich ===
1953 Queensland state election: Ipswich
| Party | Candidate | Votes | % | ±% |
|---|---|---|---|---|
| Labor | Ivor Marsden | 8,090 | 94.6 | +30.6 |
| Communist | Richard Cobb | 463 | 5.4 | +5.4 |
| Total formal votes | | 8,553 | 94.6 | −4.4 |
| Informal votes | | 492 | 5.4 | +4.4 |
| Turnout | | 9,045 | 93.3 | +3.2 |
| Labor hold | | Swing | N/A | |

=== Isis ===
1953 Queensland state election: Isis
| Party | Candidate | Votes | % | ±% |
|---|---|---|---|---|
| Country | Jack Pizzey | 5,326 | 58.7 | −3.2 |
| Labor | John Barron | 3,743 | 41.3 | +3.2 |
| Total formal votes | | 9,069 | 98.7 | +1.6 |
| Informal votes | | 123 | 1.3 | −1.6 |
| Turnout | | 9,192 | 94.6 | −0.4 |
| Country hold | | Swing | −3.2 | |

=== Ithaca ===
1953 Queensland state election: Ithaca
| Party | Candidate | Votes | % | ±% |
|---|---|---|---|---|
| Labor | Leonard Eastment | 6,513 | 65.0 | +4.3 |
| Liberal | Douglas Lowndes | 3,361 | 33.6 | −5.7 |
| Communist | Herbert Heritage | 141 | 1.4 | +1.4 |
| Total formal votes | | 10,015 | 98.9 | 0.0 |
| Informal votes | | 107 | 1.1 | 0.0 |
| Turnout | | 10,122 | 95.4 | +1.3 |
| Labor hold | | Swing | +5.3 | |

=== Kedron ===
1953 Queensland state election: Kedron
| Party | Candidate | Votes | % | ±% |
|---|---|---|---|---|
| Labor | Eric Lloyd | 10,279 | 65.8 | +17.8 |
| Liberal | John Harris | 5,351 | 34.2 | −17.8 |
| Total formal votes | | 15,630 | 99.0 | −0.2 |
| Informal votes | | 160 | 1.0 | +0.2 |
| Turnout | | 15,790 | 95.7 | +0.8 |
| Labor hold | | Swing | +17.8 | |

=== Kelvin Grove ===
1953 Queensland state election: Kelvin Grove
| Party | Candidate | Votes | % | ±% |
|---|---|---|---|---|
| Labor | Bert Turner | 6,314 | 61.9 | +5.7 |
| Liberal | Mary Lahey | 3,883 | 38.1 | −5.7 |
| Total formal votes | | 10,197 | 98.4 | −0.6 |
| Informal votes | | 165 | 1.6 | +0.6 |
| Turnout | | 10,362 | 94.8 | +0.1 |
| Labor hold | | Swing | +5.7 | |

=== Keppel ===
1953 Queensland state election: Keppel
| Party | Candidate | Votes | % | ±% |
|---|---|---|---|---|
| Labor | Viv Cooper | 5,850 | 55.4 | −0.7 |
| Country | Alfred Ganter | 4,001 | 37.9 | −6.0 |
| Independent | Tolstoy Birkbeck | 703 | 6.7 | +6.7 |
| Total formal votes | | 10,554 | 99.0 | −0.3 |
| Informal votes | | 111 | 1.0 | +0.3 |
| Turnout | | 10,665 | 95.7 | +1.7 |
| Labor hold | | Swing | +3.3 | |

=== Kurilpa ===
1953 Queensland state election: Kurilpa
| Party | Candidate | Votes | % | ±% |
|---|---|---|---|---|
| Labor | Tom Moores | 5,853 | 62.7 | +5.3 |
| Liberal | Lilian Derrick | 2,868 | 30.7 | −11.9 |
| Social Credit | Richard Boorman | 349 | 3.7 | +3.7 |
| Communist | Anna Slater | 165 | 1.8 | +1.8 |
| Independent | Sydney Clare | 101 | 1.1 | +1.1 |
| Total formal votes | | 9,336 | 98.1 | −0.4 |
| Informal votes | | 180 | 1.9 | +0.4 |
| Turnout | | 9,516 | 91.7 | −1.8 |
| Labor hold | | Swing | +9.7 | |

=== Landsborough ===
1953 Queensland state election: Landsborough
| Party | Candidate | Votes | % | ±% |
|---|---|---|---|---|
| Country | Frank Nicklin | unopposed | | |
| Country hold | | Swing | | |

=== Lockyer ===
1953 Queensland state election: Lockyer
| Party | Candidate | Votes | % | ±% |
|---|---|---|---|---|
| Liberal | Gordon Chalk | 6,177 | 67.1 | +3.9 |
| Labor | John Hilton | 3,032 | 32.9 | +7.7 |
| Total formal votes | | 9,209 | 99.5 | −0.1 |
| Informal votes | | 47 | 0.5 | +0.1 |
| Turnout | | 9,256 | 95.4 | +2.2 |
| Liberal hold | | Swing | −4.4 | |

=== Mackay ===
1953 Queensland state election: Mackay
| Party | Candidate | Votes | % | ±% |
|---|---|---|---|---|
| Labor | Fred Graham | 4,586 | 64.5 | +9.5 |
| Liberal | Flora Johnson | 2,520 | 35.5 | −9.5 |
| Total formal votes | | 7,106 | 99.3 | +0.1 |
| Informal votes | | 48 | 0.7 | −0.1 |
| Turnout | | 7,154 | 95.9 | +3.8 |
| Labor hold | | Swing | +9.5 | |

=== Mackenzie ===
1953 Queensland state election: Mackenzie
| Party | Candidate | Votes | % | ±% |
|---|---|---|---|---|
| Labor | Paddy Whyte | 2,420 | 55.0 | +3.7 |
| Country | James Lawrence | 1,978 | 45.0 | −3.7 |
| Total formal votes | | 4,398 | 99.2 | +0.5 |
| Informal votes | | 36 | 0.8 | −0.5 |
| Turnout | | 4,434 | 90.1 | +1.1 |
| Labor hold | | Swing | +3.7 | |

=== Marodian ===
1953 Queensland state election: Marodian
| Party | Candidate | Votes | % | ±% |
|---|---|---|---|---|
| Country | James Heading | 5,748 | 67.6 | −2.2 |
| Labor | Sydney Campbell | 2,754 | 32.4 | +2.2 |
| Total formal votes | | 8,502 | 99.1 | −0.3 |
| Informal votes | | 79 | 0.9 | +0.3 |
| Turnout | | 8,581 | 93.3 | +3.1 |
| Country hold | | Swing | −2.2 | |

=== Maryborough ===
1953 Queensland state election: Maryborough
| Party | Candidate | Votes | % | ±% |
|---|---|---|---|---|
| Labor | David Farrell | 5,429 | 56.0 | −9.5 |
| Independent | Cyril Tanner | 4,178 | 43.1 | +43.1 |
| Communist | Charles Reed | 92 | 0.9 | +0.9 |
| Total formal votes | | 9,699 | 97.8 | −0.2 |
| Informal votes | | 214 | 2.2 | +0.2 |
| Turnout | | 9,913 | 97.5 | +0.9 |
| Labor hold | | Swing | N/A | |

==== By-election ====
- This by-election was caused by the death of David Farrell. It was held on 28 November 1953.

1953 Maryborough state by-election
| Party | Candidate | Votes | % | ±% |
|---|---|---|---|---|
| Labor | Horace Davies | 5,730 | 61.2 | +5.2 |
| Independent | Ralph Stafford | 3,640 | 38.8 | +38.8 |
| Total formal votes | | 9,370 | 98.5 | +0.7 |
| Informal votes | | 141 | 1.5 | −0.7 |
| Turnout | | 9,511 | 91.7 | −5.8 |
| Labor hold | | Swing | N/A | |

=== Merthyr ===
1953 Queensland state election: Merthyr
| Party | Candidate | Votes | % | ±% |
|---|---|---|---|---|
| Labor | Bill Moore | 6,110 | 63.8 | +7.8 |
| Liberal | William Knox | 3,470 | 36.2 | −7.8 |
| Total formal votes | | 9,580 | 98.7 | 0.0 |
| Informal votes | | 129 | 1.3 | 0.0 |
| Turnout | | 9,709 | 93.9 | +0.5 |
| Labor hold | | Swing | +7.8 | |

=== Mirani ===
1953 Queensland state election: Mirani
| Party | Candidate | Votes | % | ±% |
|---|---|---|---|---|
| Country | Ernie Evans | 4,332 | 57.9 | −5.1 |
| Labor | Roger Scanlan | 3,146 | 42.1 | +5.1 |
| Total formal votes | | 7,478 | 99.0 | −0.3 |
| Informal votes | | 74 | 1.0 | +0.3 |
| Turnout | | 7,552 | 94.8 | +2.6 |
| Country hold | | Swing | −5.1 | |

=== Mount Coot-tha ===
1953 Queensland state election: Mount Coot-tha
| Party | Candidate | Votes | % | ±% |
|---|---|---|---|---|
| Liberal | Kenneth Morris | 7,484 | 57.3 | −2.8 |
| Labor | Vlad Darveniza | 5,578 | 42.7 | +2.8 |
| Total formal votes | | 13,062 | 98.8 | −0.2 |
| Informal votes | | 163 | 1.2 | +0.2 |
| Turnout | | 13,225 | 94.2 | +0.4 |
| Liberal hold | | Swing | −2.8 | |

=== Mount Gravatt ===
1953 Queensland state election: Mount Gravatt
| Party | Candidate | Votes | % | ±% |
|---|---|---|---|---|
| Labor | Felix Dittmer | 12,203 | 63.5 | +11.2 |
| Liberal | Daniel Rowley | 6,635 | 34.5 | −11.5 |
| Communist | George Bordujenko | 386 | 2.0 | +2.0 |
| Total formal votes | | 19,224 | 98.7 | +0.1 |
| Informal votes | | 259 | 1.3 | −0.1 |
| Turnout | | 19,483 | 93.6 | +1.5 |
| Labor hold | | Swing | +11.6 | |

=== Mourilyan ===
1953 Queensland state election: Mourilyan
| Party | Candidate | Votes | % | ±% |
|---|---|---|---|---|
| Labor | Peter Byrne | 4,867 | 67.3 | +23.8 |
| Country | John Castor | 2,142 | 29.6 | −9.0 |
| Communist | Bertie Clark | 227 | 3.1 | −0.6 |
| Total formal votes | | 7,236 | 99.2 | 0.0 |
| Informal votes | | 58 | 0.8 | 0.0 |
| Turnout | | 7,294 | 94.1 | +2.5 |
| Labor hold | | Swing | +16.4 | |

=== Mulgrave ===
1953 Queensland state election: Mulgrave
| Party | Candidate | Votes | % | ±% |
|---|---|---|---|---|
| Labor | Charles English | 3,716 | 51.1 | +7.1 |
| Country | Bob Watson | 3,553 | 48.9 | +0.1 |
| Total formal votes | | 7,269 | 98.7 | −0.2 |
| Informal votes | | 99 | 1.3 | +0.2 |
| Turnout | | 7,368 | 92.9 | +2.0 |
| Labor gain from Country | | Swing | +3.7 | |

=== Mundingburra ===
1953 Queensland state election: Mundingburra
| Party | Candidate | Votes | % | ±% |
|---|---|---|---|---|
| NQ Labor | Tom Aikens | 4,372 | 52.5 | +9.9 |
| Labor | Daniel Gleeson | 2,303 | 27.7 | +3.8 |
| Liberal | Christopher Wordsworth | 1,647 | 19.8 | −13.9 |
| Total formal votes | | 8,322 | 99.3 | +0.6 |
| Informal votes | | 56 | 0.7 | −0.6 |
| Turnout | | 8,378 | 94.8 | +2.5 |
| NQ Labor hold | | Swing | N/A | |

=== Murrumba ===
1953 Queensland state election: Murrumba
| Party | Candidate | Votes | % | ±% |
|---|---|---|---|---|
| Country | David Nicholson | 6,564 | 57.8 | −7.3 |
| Labor | Kenneth Griffith | 4,801 | 42.2 | +7.3 |
| Total formal votes | | 11,365 | 99.2 | +0.3 |
| Informal votes | | 89 | 0.8 | −0.3 |
| Turnout | | 11,454 | 92.5 | −0.7 |
| Country hold | | Swing | −7.3 | |

=== Nash ===
1953 Queensland state election: Nash
| Party | Candidate | Votes | % | ±% |
|---|---|---|---|---|
| Labor | Greg Kehoe | 5,583 | 56.1 | +6.0 |
| Liberal | Ronald Witham | 4,373 | 43.9 | −6.0 |
| Total formal votes | | 9,956 | 99.2 | −0.2 |
| Informal votes | | 75 | 0.8 | +0.2 |
| Turnout | | 10,031 | 94.2 | +0.1 |
| Labor hold | | Swing | +6.0 | |

=== Norman ===
1953 Queensland state election: Norman
| Party | Candidate | Votes | % | ±% |
|---|---|---|---|---|
| Labor | Bill Baxter | 6,447 | 59.2 | +10.4 |
| Liberal | Rex Brock | 4,446 | 40.8 | −10.4 |
| Total formal votes | | 10,893 | 98.9 | 0.0 |
| Informal votes | | 116 | 1.1 | 0.0 |
| Turnout | | 11,009 | 93.9 | +0.6 |
| Labor gain from Liberal | | Swing | +10.4 | |

=== North Toowoomba ===
1953 Queensland state election: North Toowoomba
| Party | Candidate | Votes | % | ±% |
|---|---|---|---|---|
| Labor | Les Wood | 5,649 | 61.8 | +7.4 |
| Liberal | John Groom | 3,486 | 38.2 | −7.4 |
| Total formal votes | | 9,135 | 99.1 | −0.1 |
| Informal votes | | 82 | 0.9 | +0.1 |
| Turnout | | 9,217 | 93.7 | +4.7 |
| Labor hold | | Swing | +7.4 | |

=== Nundah ===
1953 Queensland state election: Nundah
| Party | Candidate | Votes | % | ±% |
|---|---|---|---|---|
| Labor | Frank Roberts | 6,882 | 61.9 | +9.6 |
| Liberal | Nellie Taylor | 4,232 | 38.1 | −9.6 |
| Total formal votes | | 11,114 | 98.6 | −0.3 |
| Informal votes | | 162 | 1.4 | +0.3 |
| Turnout | | 11,276 | 94.5 | +0.7 |
| Labor hold | | Swing | +9.6 | |

=== Port Curtis ===
1953 Queensland state election: Port Curtis
| Party | Candidate | Votes | % | ±% |
|---|---|---|---|---|
| Labor | Jim Burrows | 6,241 | 67.8 | +10.0 |
| Liberal | Julia Hinds | 2,970 | 32.2 | −10.0 |
| Total formal votes | | 9,211 | 99.2 | 0.0 |
| Informal votes | | 69 | 0.8 | 0.0 |
| Turnout | | 9,280 | 95.3 | +0.6 |
| Labor hold | | Swing | +10.0 | |

=== Rockhampton ===
1953 Queensland state election: Rockhampton
| Party | Candidate | Votes | % | ±% |
|---|---|---|---|---|
| Labor | James Larcombe | 5,457 | 61.8 | +10.5 |
| Liberal | Thomas Donohoe | 3,141 | 35.6 | −13.0 |
| Independent | Thomas Kelly | 227 | 2.6 | +2.6 |
| Total formal votes | | 8,825 | 99.0 | 0.0 |
| Informal votes | | 88 | 1.0 | 0.0 |
| Turnout | | 8,913 | 95.1 | +2.2 |
| Labor hold | | Swing | +12.2 | |

=== Roma ===
1953 Queensland state election: Roma
| Party | Candidate | Votes | % | ±% |
|---|---|---|---|---|
| Labor | Alfred Dohring | 2,555 | 51.6 | +4.9 |
| Country | William Ewan | 2,393 | 48.4 | −4.9 |
| Total formal votes | | 4,948 | 99.3 | +0.4 |
| Informal votes | | 35 | 0.7 | −0.4 |
| Turnout | | 4,983 | 94.1 | +0.4 |
| Labor gain from Country | | Swing | +4.9 | |

=== Sandgate ===
1953 Queensland state election: Sandgate
| Party | Candidate | Votes | % | ±% |
|---|---|---|---|---|
| Labor | Herbert Robinson | 8,047 | 55.9 | +9.9 |
| Liberal | Eric Decker | 6,338 | 44.1 | −9.9 |
| Total formal votes | | 14,385 | 98.6 | 0.0 |
| Informal votes | | 209 | 1.4 | 0.0 |
| Turnout | | 14,594 | 94.0 | −0.3 |
| Labor gain from Liberal | | Swing | +9.9 | |

=== Sherwood ===
1953 Queensland state election: Sherwood
| Party | Candidate | Votes | % | ±% |
|---|---|---|---|---|
| Liberal | Tom Kerr | 6,830 | 50.5 | −7.9 |
| Labor | Robert Mansfield | 6,552 | 48.5 | +6.9 |
| Independent | Pablo O'Dowd | 141 | 1.0 | +1.0 |
| Total formal votes | | 13,523 | 98.8 | −0.4 |
| Informal votes | | 169 | 1.2 | +0.4 |
| Turnout | | 13,692 | 94.2 | +0.8 |
| Liberal hold | | Swing | −7.4 | |

=== Somerset ===
1953 Queensland state election: Somerset
| Party | Candidate | Votes | % | ±% |
|---|---|---|---|---|
| Labor | Alexander Skinner | 4,522 | 51.0 | +8.8 |
| Country | James Brough | 4,353 | 49.0 | −8.8 |
| Total formal votes | | 8,875 | 99.1 | −0.1 |
| Informal votes | | 78 | 0.9 | +0.1 |
| Turnout | | 8,953 | 93.9 | +0.4 |
| Labor gain from Country | | Swing | +8.8 | |

=== South Brisbane ===
1953 Queensland state election: South Brisbane
| Party | Candidate | Votes | % | ±% |
|---|---|---|---|---|
| Labor | Vince Gair | 5,847 | 64.6 | +8.1 |
| Liberal | Geoffrey Wadeson | 2,787 | 30.8 | −12.7 |
| Independent | John Parker | 418 | 4.6 | +4.6 |
| Total formal votes | | 9,052 | 98.5 | −0.4 |
| Informal votes | | 134 | 1.5 | +0.4 |
| Turnout | | 9,186 | 90.4 | −1.5 |
| Labor hold | | Swing | +11.2 | |

=== Southport ===
1953 Queensland state election: Southport
| Party | Candidate | Votes | % | ±% |
|---|---|---|---|---|
| Country | Eric Gaven | 6,089 | 60.2 | +11.2 |
| Labor | Edgar Hill | 4,031 | 39.8 | +11.0 |
| Total formal votes | | 10,120 | 99.3 | −0.3 |
| Informal votes | | 74 | 0.7 | +0.3 |
| Turnout | | 10,194 | 93.2 | +2.2 |
| Country hold | | Swing | −2.8 | |

=== Tablelands ===
1953 Queensland state election: Tablelands
| Party | Candidate | Votes | % | ±% |
|---|---|---|---|---|
| Labor | Harold Collins | 5,165 | 66.3 | +12.7 |
| Country | James Baldock | 2,412 | 30.9 | −8.9 |
| Communist | Richard Anear | 217 | 2.8 | +2.8 |
| Total formal votes | | 7,794 | 99.1 | −0.2 |
| Informal votes | | 72 | 0.9 | +0.2 |
| Turnout | | 7,866 | 91.4 | +1.5 |
| Labor hold | | Swing | +10.8 | |

=== Toowong ===
1953 Queensland state election: Toowong
| Party | Candidate | Votes | % | ±% |
|---|---|---|---|---|
| Liberal | Alan Munro | 7,135 | 62.8 | −4.2 |
| Labor | Frank Venables | 4,234 | 37.2 | +4.2 |
| Total formal votes | | 11,369 | 98.8 | −0.3 |
| Informal votes | | 136 | 1.2 | +0.3 |
| Turnout | | 11,505 | 94.0 | +0.6 |
| Liberal hold | | Swing | −4.2 | |

=== Toowoomba ===
1953 Queensland state election: Toowoomba
| Party | Candidate | Votes | % | ±% |
|---|---|---|---|---|
| Labor | Jack Duggan | 6,086 | 66.1 | +10.4 |
| Liberal | Frank Farnell | 3,123 | 33.9 | −10.4 |
| Total formal votes | | 9,209 | 99.2 | +0.2 |
| Informal votes | | 71 | 0.8 | −0.2 |
| Turnout | | 9,280 | 93.5 | +3.0 |
| Labor hold | | Swing | +10.4 | |

=== Townsville ===
1953 Queensland state election: Townsville
| Party | Candidate | Votes | % | ±% |
|---|---|---|---|---|
| Labor | George Keyatta | 3,786 | 58.4 | +6.8 |
| Liberal | Archibald Hooper | 1,713 | 26.4 | −12.0 |
| NQ Labor | Kevin Gormley | 782 | 12.1 | +4.9 |
| Communist | Hugh Fay | 200 | 3.1 | +3.1 |
| Total formal votes | | 6,481 | 98.7 | +0.1 |
| Informal votes | | 85 | 1.3 | −0.1 |
| Turnout | | 6,566 | 92.4 | +5.8 |
| Labor hold | | Swing | +11.5 | |

=== Warrego ===
1953 Queensland state election: Warrego
| Party | Candidate | Votes | % | ±% |
|---|---|---|---|---|
| Labor | John Dufficy | unopposed | | |
| Labor hold | | Swing | | |

=== Warwick ===
1953 Queensland state election: Warwick
| Party | Candidate | Votes | % | ±% |
|---|---|---|---|---|
| Country | Otto Madsen | 5,651 | 64.8 | −3.6 |
| Labor | John O'Brien | 3,069 | 35.2 | +3.6 |
| Total formal votes | | 8,720 | 99.2 | 0.0 |
| Informal votes | | 67 | 0.8 | 0.0 |
| Turnout | | 8,787 | 95.7 | +2.3 |
| Country hold | | Swing | −3.6 | |

=== Whitsunday ===
1953 Queensland state election: Whitsunday
| Party | Candidate | Votes | % | ±% |
|---|---|---|---|---|
| Country | Lloyd Roberts | 3,878 | 49.5 | +4.2 |
| Labor | Hugh MacLennan | 3,510 | 44.8 | +8.3 |
| Communist | Jim Henderson | 443 | 5.7 | −7.0 |
| Total formal votes | | 7,831 | 99.2 | +0.2 |
| Informal votes | | 65 | 0.8 | −0.2 |
| Turnout | | 7,896 | 94.1 | +2.5 |
| Country hold | | Swing | −2.9 | |

=== Windsor ===
1953 Queensland state election: Windsor
| Party | Candidate | Votes | % | ±% |
|---|---|---|---|---|
| Labor | Tom Rasey | 6,011 | 60.2 | +10.1 |
| Liberal | John Cutting | 3,980 | 39.8 | −10.1 |
| Total formal votes | | 9,901 | 98.9 | −0.2 |
| Informal votes | | 108 | 1.1 | +0.2 |
| Turnout | | 10,009 | 94.1 | +0.5 |
| Labor hold | | Swing | +10.1 | |

=== Wynnum ===
1953 Queensland state election: Wynnum
| Party | Candidate | Votes | % | ±% |
|---|---|---|---|---|
| Labor | Bill Gunn | 9,261 | 69.5 | +8.5 |
| Liberal | Charles Mengel | 4,066 | 30.5 | −8.5 |
| Total formal votes | | 13,327 | 98.9 | −0.2 |
| Informal votes | | 152 | 1.1 | +0.2 |
| Turnout | | 13,479 | 93.9 | −1.2 |
| Labor hold | | Swing | +8.5 | |

=== Yeronga ===
1953 Queensland state election: Yeronga
| Party | Candidate | Votes | % | ±% |
|---|---|---|---|---|
| Liberal | Winston Noble | 6,041 | 51.2 | −7.6 |
| Labor | Tom Doyle | 5,767 | 48.8 | +7.6 |
| Total formal votes | | 11,808 | 98.8 | +0.3 |
| Informal votes | | 146 | 1.2 | −0.3 |
| Turnout | | 11,954 | 95.3 | +1.7 |
| Liberal hold | | Swing | −7.6 | |

== See also ==
- 1953 Queensland state election
- Candidates of the Queensland state election, 1953
- Members of the Queensland Legislative Assembly, 1953-1956
