= Candidates of the 1953 Queensland state election =

The 1953 state election in Queensland, Australia was held on 7 March 1953.

== By-elections ==
- On 18 November 1950, Mick Brosnan (Labor) was elected to succeed Samuel Brassington (Labor), who had died on 4 October 1950, as the member for Fortitude Valley.
- On 3 March 1951, John Dufficy (Labor) was elected to succeed Harry O'Shea (Labor), who had died on 4 November 1950, as the member for Warrego.
- On 14 April 1951, Eric Lloyd (Labor) was elected to succeed Bruce Pie (Liberal), who had resigned on 6 January 1951, as the member for Kedron.
- On 5 April 1952, Leonard Eastment was elected to succeed Ned Hanlon (Labor), who had died on 15 January 1952, as the member for Ithaca.
- On 25 October 1952, Viv Cooper (Labor) was elected to succeed Walter Ingram (Labor), who had died on 24 July 1952, as the member for Keppel.

== Retiring Members ==
=== Labor ===
- Thomas Dunstan MLA (Nash)

=== Country ===
- Duncan MacDonald MLA (Somerset)
- Malcolm McIntyre MLA (Cunningham)

=== Liberal ===
- Louis Luckins MLA (Norman)

== Candidates ==
Sitting members at the time of the election are shown in bold text.

Electorate	Held by	Labor candidate	Coalition candidate	Other candidates
Aubigny	Country		**Jim Sparkes** (CP)	Vic Sullivan (Ind)
Balonne	Labor	**John Taylor**	Claude Dunshea (CP)	
Barambah	Country		**Joh Bjelke-Petersen** (CP)	
Barcoo	Labor	**Ned Davis**		
Baroona	Labor	**Bill Power**		
Belyando	Labor	**Tom Foley**		
Bremer	Labor	**Jim Donald**		
Brisbane	Labor	**Johnno Mann**		Laura Hansen (CPA); Colin Nonmus (SC)
Bulimba	Labor	**Bob Gardner**	Ronald Holt (Lib)	
Bundaberg	Labor	**Ted Walsh**	Willie Howard (Lib)	James Julin (Ind)
Buranda	Labor	**Dick Brown**	Cecil Holt (Lib)	
Burdekin	Independent	William Wall		**Arthur Coburn** (Ind)
Cairns	Labor	**Thomas Crowley**	Arthur Keller (CP)	Charles Crawley (PLP); Cedric Dyer (CPA)
Callide	Country	Patrick Moore	**Vince Jones** (CP)	
Carnarvon	Labor	**Paul Hilton**	Eric McCorkell (CP)	
Carpentaria	Labor	**Norm Smith**	William Aplin (CP)	
Charters Towers	Labor	**Arthur Jones**		
Chermside	Liberal	Kenneth McRae	**Alex Dewar** (Lib)	
Clayfield	Liberal		**Harold Taylor** (Lib)	
Condamine	Country	Les Diplock	**Eric Allpass** (CP)	
Cook	Country	Bunny Adair	**Carlisle Wordsworth** (CP)	
Cooroora	Country	Geoffrey Arnell	**David Low** (CP)	
Coorparoo	Liberal	Gerald Maher	**Thomas Hiley** (Lib)	
Cunningham	Country	Robert Bradfield	Alan Fletcher (CP)	
Darlington	Country	Charles Knoll	**Tom Plunkett** (CP)	William Yarrow (CPA)
Fassifern	Country		**Alf Muller** (CP)	Oliver Hooper (Ind)
Fitzroy	Labor	**Jim Clark**	William Hoare (Lib)	Eric Browne (CPA)
Flinders	Labor	**Ernest Riordan**		
Fortitude Valley	Labor	**Mick Brosnan**		Albert Graham (CPA); John Marion (SC)
Gregory	Labor	**George Devries**		
Haughton	Labor	**Colin McCathie**	Frederick Purdie (CP)	Ernest O'Brien (NQLP)
Hinchinbrook	Labor	**Cecil Jesson**	James Ryan (Lib)	Douglas Jeffrey (Ind)
Ipswich	Labor	**Ivor Marsden**		Richard Cobb (CPA)
Isis	Country	John Barron	**Jack Pizzey** (CP)	
Ithaca	Labor	**Leonard Eastment**	Douglas Lowndes (Lib)	Herbert Heritage (CPA)
Kedron	Labor	**Eric Lloyd**	John Harris (Lib)	
Kelvin Grove	Labor	**Bert Turner**	Mary Lahey (Lib)	
Keppel	Labor	**Viv Cooper**	Alfred Ganter (CP)	Tolstoy Birkbeck (Ind)
Kurilpa	Labor	**Tom Moores**	Lilian Derrick (Lib)	Richard Boorman (SC); Sydney Clare (Ind); Anna Slater (CPA)
Landsborough	Country		**Frank Nicklin** (CP)	
Lockyer	Liberal	John Hilton	**Gordon Chalk** (Lib)	
Mackay	Labor	**Fred Graham**	Flora Johnson (Lib)	
Mackenzie	Labor	**Paddy Whyte**	James Lawrence (CP)	
Marodian	Country	Sydney Campbell	**James Heading** (CP)	
Maryborough	Labor	**David Farrell**		Charles Reed (CPA); Cyril Tanner (Ind)
Merthyr	Labor	**Bill Moore**	William Knox (Lib)	
Mirani	Country	Roger Scanlan	**Ernie Evans** (CP)	
Mount Coot-tha	Liberal	Vlad Darveniza	**Kenneth Morris** (Lib)	
Mount Gravatt	Labor	**Felix Dittmer**	Daniel Rowley (Lib)	George Bordujenko (CPA)
Mourilyan	Labor	**Peter Byrne**	John Castor (CP)	Bertie Clark (CPA)
Mulgrave	Country	Charles English	**Bob Watson** (CP)	
Mundingburra	NQ Labor	Daniel Gleeson	Christopher Wordsworth (Lib)	**Tom Aikens** (NQLP)
Murrumba	Country	Kenneth Griffith	**David Nicholson** (CP)	
Nash	Labor	Greg Kehoe	Ronald Witham (Lib)	
Norman	Liberal	Bill Baxter	Rex Brock (Lib)	
North Toowoomba	Labor	**Les Wood**	John Groom (Lib)	
Nundah	Labor	**Frank Roberts**	Nellie Taylor (Lib)	
Port Curtis	Labor	**Jim Burrows**	Julia Hinds (Lib)	
Rockhampton	Labor	**James Larcombe**	Thomas Donohoe (Lib)	Thomas Kelly (Ind)
Roma	Country	Alfred Dohring	**William Ewan** (CP)	
Sandgate	Liberal	Herbert Robinson	**Eric Decker** (Lib)	
Sherwood	Liberal	Robert Mansfield	**Tom Kerr** (Lib)	Pablo O'Dowd (Ind)
Somerset	Country	Alexander Skinner	James Brough (CP)	
South Brisbane	Labor	**Vince Gair**	Geoffrey Wadeson (Lib)	John Parker (Ind)
Southport	Country	Edgar Hill	**Eric Gaven** (CP)	
Tablelands	Labor	**Harold Collins**	James Baldock (CP)	Richard Anear (CPA)
Toowong	Liberal	Frank Venables	**Alan Munro** (Lib)	
Toowoomba	Labor	**Jack Duggan**	Frank Farnell (Lib)	
Townsville	Labor	**George Keyatta**	Archibald Hooper (Lib)	Hugh Fay (CPA); Kevin Gormley (NQLP)
Warrego	Labor	**John Dufficy**		
Warwick	Country	John O'Brien	**Otto Madsen** (CP)	
Whitsunday	Country	Hugh MacLennan	**Lloyd Roberts** (CP)	Jim Henderson (CPA)
Windsor	Labor	**Tom Rasey**	John Cutting (Lib)	
Wynnum	Labor	**Bill Gunn**	Charles Mengel (Lib)	
Yeronga	Liberal	Tom Doyle	**Winston Noble** (Lib)	

== See also ==
- 1953 Queensland state election
- Members of the Queensland Legislative Assembly, 1950–1953
- Members of the Queensland Legislative Assembly, 1953–1956
- List of political parties in Australia
