= Electoral results for the district of Condamine =

Queensland, Australia, district election results

This is a list of electoral results for the electoral district of Condamine in Queensland state elections.

== Members for Condamine ==
First incarnation (1950–1992)
Member	Party	Term
Frederick Allpass	Country	1950–1953
Les Diplock	Labor	1953–1957
Les Diplock	Queensland Labor	1957–1960
Vic Sullivan	Country	1960–1974
Vic Sullivan	National	1974–1983
Brian Littleproud	National	1983–1992
Second incarnation (2009–present)
Member	Party	Term
Ray Hopper	Liberal National	2009–2012
Ray Hopper	Katter's Australian	2012–2015
Pat Weir	Liberal National	2015–present

== Election results ==
=== Elections in the 2020s ===
2024 Queensland state election: Condamine
Party	Candidate	Votes	%	±%
Liberal National	Pat Weir	22,562	60.12	+5.46
Labor	Ben Whibley-Faulkner	6,685	17.81	−5.21
One Nation	Clay Harland	4,122	10.98	−4.67
Family First	Alan Hughes	2,086	5.56	+5.56
Greens	Ellisa Parker	2,074	5.53	+0.62
Total formal votes		37,529	96.62	−0.52
Informal votes		1,312	3.38	+0.52
Turnout		38,841	91.92	+0.13
Two-party-preferred result
Liberal National	Pat Weir	27,620	73.60	+4.40
Labor	Ben Whibley-Faulkner	9,909	26.40	−4.40
Liberal National hold		Swing	+4.40	

2020 Queensland state election: Condamine
Party	Candidate	Votes	%	±%
Liberal National	Pat Weir	18,466	54.66	+12.86
Labor	Brendon Huybregts	7,775	23.02	+4.98
One Nation	Greg Priebe	5,286	15.65	−8.13
Greens	Sean Womersley	1,659	4.91	−0.07
United Australia	Nui Harris	595	1.76	+1.76
Total formal votes		33,781	97.14	+0.47
Informal votes		993	2.86	−0.47
Turnout		34,774	91.79	−0.03
Two-party-preferred result
Liberal National	Pat Weir	23,376	69.20	+5.00
Labor	Brendon Huybregts	10,405	30.80	−5.00
Liberal National hold		Swing	+5.00	

=== Elections in the 2010s ===
2017 Queensland state election: Condamine
Party	Candidate	Votes	%	±%
Liberal National	Pat Weir	13,554	41.8	−10.4
One Nation	Frank Ashman	7,709	23.8	+23.8
Labor	Brendon Huybregts	5,848	18.0	−2.7
Katter's Australian	John Hill	3,694	11.4	−4.0
Greens	Chris Turnbull	1,616	5.0	+1.1
Total formal votes		32,421	96.7	−1.4
Informal votes		1,117	3.3	+1.4
Turnout		33,538	91.8	+3.7
Two-candidate-preferred result
Liberal National	Pat Weir	17,749	60.7	−6.4
One Nation	Frank Ashman	11,489	39.3	+39.3
Liberal National hold		Swing	−6.4	

2015 Queensland state election: Condamine
Party	Candidate	Votes	%	±%
Liberal National	Pat Weir	17,028	51.18	−7.12
Labor	Brendon Huybregts	7,271	21.86	+7.70
Katter's Australian	Ben Hopper	5,059	15.21	−6.11
Family First	Alexandra Todd	1,455	4.37	+4.37
Greens	Pamela Fay Weekes	1,306	3.93	−0.11
Independent	Shane White	1,150	3.46	+1.27
Total formal votes		33,269	97.91	−0.11
Informal votes		710	2.09	+0.11
Turnout		33,979	92.67	−1.52
Two-party-preferred result
Liberal National	Pat Weir	18,837	66.28	−3.82
Labor	Brendon Huybregts	9,584	33.72	+33.72
Liberal National hold		Swing	−3.82	

2012 Queensland state election: Condamine
Party	Candidate	Votes	%	±%
Liberal National	Ray Hopper	18,409	58.30	+10.64
Katter's Australian	John Mathison	6,732	21.32	+21.32
Labor	Nev Swan	4,471	14.16	−5.48
Greens	Gabriele Tabikh	1,273	4.03	+0.68
Independent	Shane White	691	2.19	+2.19
Total formal votes		31,576	98.02	−0.38
Informal votes		637	1.98	+0.38
Turnout		32,213	94.19	+0.46
Two-candidate-preferred result
Liberal National	Ray Hopper	19,324	70.10	+8.54
Katter's Australian	John Mathison	8,242	29.90	+29.90
Liberal National hold		Swing	+8.54	

=== Elections in the 2000s ===
2009 Queensland state election: Condamine
Party	Candidate	Votes	%	±%
Liberal National	Ray Hopper	14,360	47.7	−11.6
Independent	Stuart Copeland	7,664	25.4	+25.4
Labor	Tracey Harris	5,917	19.6	−7.1
Greens	Craig Sheehan	1,009	3.3	+1.3
One Nation	Rod Watson	860	2.9	+2.9
Independent	Stephanie Bugg	323	1.1	+1.1
Total formal votes		30,133	98.3	
Informal votes		490	1.7	
Turnout		30,623	93.73	
Two-candidate-preferred result
Liberal National	Ray Hopper	15,200	61.6	−7.1
Independent	Stuart Copeland	9,491	38.4	+38.4
Liberal National hold		Swing	−7.1	

=== Elections in the 1980s ===
1989 Queensland state election: Condamine
Party	Candidate	Votes	%	±%
National	Brian Littleproud	9,102	75.4	−3.1
Labor	Bill Murphy	2,967	24.6	+3.1
Total formal votes		12,069	95.9	−1.9
Informal votes		514	4.1	+1.9
Turnout		12,583	93.6	−0.3
National hold		Swing	−3.1	

1986 Queensland state election: Condamine
Party	Candidate	Votes	%	±%
National	Brian Littleproud	9,479	78.5	+10.6
Labor	Gordon Zigenbine	2,598	21.5	+1.2
Total formal votes		12,077	97.8	
Informal votes		272	2.2	
Turnout		12,349	93.9	
National hold		Swing	+1.8	

1983 Queensland state election: Condamine
Party	Candidate	Votes	%	±%
National	Brian Littleproud	8,272	67.8	−0.1
Labor	Barry Hicks	2,473	20.3	−4.2
Independent	Margaret Wuth	1,447	11.9	+11.9
Total formal votes		12,192	99.4	+0.1
Informal votes		78	0.6	−0.1
Turnout		12,270	94.0	+1.6
Two-party-preferred result
National	Brian Littleproud	8,996	73.8	+1.0
Labor	Barry Hicks	3,196	26.2	−1.0
National hold		Swing	+1.0	

1980 Queensland state election: Condamine
Party	Candidate	Votes	%	±%
National	Vic Sullivan	7,877	67.9	+5.7
Labor	Allan Clancey	2,843	24.5	+0.4
Progress	Lindsay Sturgess	872	7.5	−3.8
Total formal votes		11,592	99.3	+0.2
Informal votes		84	0.7	−0.2
Turnout		11,676	92.4	−0.2
Two-party-preferred result
National	Vic Sullivan	8,444	72.8	+1.4
Labor	Allan Clancey	3,148	27.2	−1.4
National hold		Swing	+1.4	

=== Elections in the 1970s ===
1977 Queensland state election: Condamine
Party	Candidate	Votes	%	±%
National	Vic Sullivan	6,989	62.2	−15.4
Labor	Noel Wormald	2,703	24.1	+5.1
Progress	Lindsay Sturgess	1,268	11.3	+11.3
Independent	Lloyd Drabsch	267	2.4	+2.4
Total formal votes		11,227	99.1	
Informal votes		103	0.9	
Turnout		11,330	92.6	
Two-party-preferred result
National	Vic Sullivan	8,011	71.4	−7.9
Labor	Noel Wormald	3,216	28.6	+7.9
National hold		Swing	−7.9	

1974 Queensland state election: Condamine
Party	Candidate	Votes	%	±%
National	Vic Sullivan	8,560	77.6	+34.0
Labor	Gladys Krause	2,095	19.0	+2.2
Independent	James Drabsch	380	3.4	+3.4
Total formal votes		11,035	98.6	−0.6
Informal votes		152	1.4	+0.6
Turnout		11,187	92.9	−0.1
Two-party-preferred result
National	Vic Sullivan	8,750	79.3	+5.6
Labor	Gladys Krause	2,285	20.7	−5.6
National hold		Swing	+5.6	

1972 Queensland state election: Condamine
Party	Candidate	Votes	%	±%
Country	Vic Sullivan	4,561	43.6	−29.7
Independent	Charles Russell	2,991	28.6	+28.6
Labor	Gladys Krause	1,759	16.8	−9.9
Queensland Labor	William Hickey	1,154	11.0	+11.0
Total formal votes		10,465	99.2	
Informal votes		84	0.8	
Turnout		10,549	93.0	
Two-party-preferred result
Country	Vic Sullivan	7,708	73.7	+0.4
Labor	Gladys Krause	2,757	26.3	−0.4
Two-candidate-preferred result
Country	Vic Sullivan	5,426	51.8	−21.5
Independent	Charles Russell	5,039	48.2	+48.2
Country hold		Swing	−21.5	

=== Elections in the 1960s ===
1969 Queensland state election: Condamine
Party	Candidate	Votes	%	±%
Country	Vic Sullivan	5,227	77.3	0.0
Labor	Nico Bos	1,531	22.7	0.0
Total formal votes		6,758	98.9	−0.1
Informal votes		78	1.1	+0.1
Turnout		6,836	93.9	−0.8
Country hold		Swing	0.0	

1966 Queensland state election: Condamine
Party	Candidate	Votes	%	±%
Country	Vic Sullivan	5,252	77.3	+4.3
Labor	Roderick Blundell	1,539	22.7	−4.3
Total formal votes		6,791	99.0	0.0
Informal votes		70	1.0	0.0
Turnout		6,861	94.7	−0.5
Country hold		Swing	+4.3	

1963 Queensland state election: Condamine
Party	Candidate	Votes	%	±%
Country	Vic Sullivan	4,941	73.0	+4.2
Labor	Reg Keating	1,825	27.0	−0.2
Total formal votes		6,766	99.0	−0.1
Informal votes		69	1.0	+0.1
Turnout		6,835	95.2	+2.5
Country hold		Swing	N/A	

1960 Queensland state election: Condamine
Party	Candidate	Votes	%	±%
Country	Vic Sullivan	4,723	68.8	
Labor	Leslie Beaumont	1,868	27.2	
Independent	James Drabsch	272	4.0	
Total formal votes		6,863	99.1	
Informal votes		59	0.9	
Turnout		6,922	92.7	
Country gain from Queensland Labor		Swing		

=== Elections in the 1950s ===
1957 Queensland state election: Condamine
Party	Candidate	Votes	%	±%
Queensland Labor	Les Diplock	5,540	48.4	+48.4
Country	Stewart Keys	5,031	43.9	−1.2
Labor	William Eggington	879	7.7	−47.2
Total formal votes		9,083	99.5	0.0
Informal votes		56	0.5	0.0
Turnout		11,506	95.4	+2.0
Queensland Labor gain from Labor		Swing	N/A	

1956 Queensland state election: Condamine
Party	Candidate	Votes	%	±%
Labor	Les Diplock	5,998	54.9	+4.4
Country	Stewart Keys	4,919	45.1	−4.4
Total formal votes		10,917	99.5	0.0
Informal votes		57	0.5	0.0
Turnout		10,974	93.4	+0.2
Labor hold		Swing	+4.4	

1953 Queensland state election: Condamine
Party	Candidate	Votes	%	±%
Labor	Leslie Diplock	5,074	50.5	+12.6
Country	Frederick Allpass	4,975	49.5	−12.6
Total formal votes		10,049	99.5	+0.1
Informal votes		53	0.5	−0.1
Turnout		10,102	93.2	+2.3
Labor gain from Country		Swing	+12.6	

1950 Queensland state election: Condamine
Party	Candidate	Votes	%	±%
Country	Frederick Allpass	5,800	62.1	
Labor	Michael Lyons	3,546	37.9	
Total formal votes		9,346	99.4	
Informal votes		57	0.6	
Turnout		9,403	90.9	
Country hold		Swing		
