= Electoral results for the district of Roma =

Queensland, Australia, district election results

This is a list of electoral results for the Roma in Queensland state elections.

== Members for Roma ==
Member	Party	Term
William Ewan	Country	1950–1953
Alfred Dohring	Labor	1953–1957
Alfred Dohring	Queensland Labor	1957
William Ewan	Country	1957–1967
Ken Tomkins	Country	1967–1974
Ken Tomkins	National	1974–1983
Russell Cooper	National	1983–1992

== Election results ==
=== Elections in the 1980s ===
1989 Queensland state election: Roma
Party	Candidate	Votes	%	±%
National	Russell Cooper	5,290	73.2	+3.7
Labor	August Johanson	1,938	26.8	−3.7
Total formal votes		7,228	96.4	−1.4
Informal votes		271	3.6	+1.4
Turnout		7,499	91.2	−0.8
National hold		Swing	+3.7	

1986 Queensland state election: Roma
Party	Candidate	Votes	%	±%
National	Russell Cooper	4,949	69.5	+15.7
Labor	Ray Johanson	2,167	30.5	+0.6
Total formal votes		7,116	97.7	
Informal votes		164	2.3	
Turnout		7,280	92.1	
National hold		Swing	+3.4	

1983 Queensland state election: Roma
Party	Candidate	Votes	%	±%
National	Russell Cooper	4,267	53.8	−11.6
Labor	August Johanson	2,367	29.9	−4.7
Liberal	Thomas Warren	997	12.6	+12.6
Democrats	Clement O'Connor	294	3.7	+3.7
Total formal votes		7,925	99.4	+0.6
Informal votes		51	0.6	−0.6
Turnout		7,976	91.6	+3.0
Two-party-preferred result
National	Russell Cooper	5,188	65.5	+0.1
Labor	August Johanson	2,737	34.5	−0.1
National hold		Swing	+0.1	

1980 Queensland state election: Roma
Party	Candidate	Votes	%	±%
National	Ken Tomkins	4,706	65.4	+2.3
Labor	David Bowden	2,491	34.6	+1.9
Total formal votes		7,197	98.8	+0.1
Informal votes		88	1.2	−0.1
Turnout		7,285	88.6	−1.5
National hold		Swing	−0.6	

=== Elections in the 1970s ===
1977 Queensland state election: Roma
Party	Candidate	Votes	%	±%
National	Ken Tomkins	4,488	63.1	−9.0
Labor	Ronald Saltau	2,326	32.7	+4.8
Progress	James Tomlinson	298	4.2	+4.2
Total formal votes		7,112	98.7	
Informal votes		93	1.3	
Turnout		7,205	90.1	
Two-party-preferred result
National	Ken Tomkins	4,697	66.0	−6.1
Labor	Ronald Saltau	2,415	34.0	+6.1
National hold		Swing	−6.1	

1974 Queensland state election: Roma
Party	Candidate	Votes	%	±%
National	Ken Tomkins	5,744	72.6	+19.6
Labor	Ben Ward	2,168	27.4	−4.4
Total formal votes		7,912	99.1	+0.1
Informal votes		74	0.9	−0.1
Turnout		7,986	88.9	−1.9
National hold		Swing	+8.6	

1972 Queensland state election: Roma
Party	Candidate	Votes	%	±%
Country	Ken Tomkins	4,613	53.0	−3.5
Labor	Marcus Thew	2,309	31.8	+1.0
Queensland Labor	Patrick Feeney	1,102	15.2	+15.2
Total formal votes		7,265	99.0	
Informal votes		73	1.0	
Turnout		7,338	90.8	
Two-party-preferred result
Country	Ken Tomkins	4,647	64.0	+3.4
Labor	Marcus Thew	2,618	36.0	−3.4
Country hold		Swing	+3.4	

=== Elections in the 1960s ===
1969 Queensland state election: Roma
Party	Candidate	Votes	%	±%
Country	Ken Tomkins	4,613	56.5	−7.2
Labor	Marcus Thew	2,511	30.8	−5.5
Independent	Ronald Alford	1,037	12.7	+12.7
Total formal votes		8,161	99.1	0.0
Informal votes		73	0.9	0.0
Turnout		8,234	93.4	+0.5
Two-party-preferred result
Country	Ken Tomkins	5,235	64.1	+0.4
Labor	Marcus Thew	2,926	35.9	−0.4
Country hold		Swing	+0.4	

1967 Roma state by-election
Party	Candidate	Votes	%	±%
Country	Ken Tomkins	3,632	49.6	−14.1
Labor	Marcus Thew	2,148	29.4	−6.9
Independent	Ronald Alford	1,535	21.0	+21.0
Total formal votes		7,315	99.3	+0.2
Informal votes		50	0.7	−0.2
Turnout		7,365	82.8	−10.1
Two-party-preferred result
Country	Ken Tomkins	4,479	61.2	−2.5
Labor	Marcus Thew	2,836	38.8	+2.5
Country hold		Swing	−2.5	

1966 Queensland state election: Roma
Party	Candidate	Votes	%	±%
Country	William Ewan	5,217	63.7	+2.2
Labor	Marcus Thew	2,973	36.3	+8.1
Total formal votes		8,190	99.1	0.0
Informal votes		74	0.9	0.0
Turnout		8,264	92.9	−0.7
Country hold		Swing	−6.2	

1963 Queensland state election: Roma
Party	Candidate	Votes	%	±%
Country	William Ewan	4,962	61.5	+17.0
Labor	Herbert Williamson	2,276	28.2	−3.1
Queensland Labor	Bryan Hurley	830	10.3	+10.3
Total formal votes		8,068	99.1	−0.2
Informal votes		71	0.9	+0.2
Turnout		8,139	93.6	+0.8
Two-party-preferred result
Country	William Ewan	5,638	69.9	
Labor	Herbert Williamson	2,430	30.1	
Country hold		Swing	N/A	

1960 Queensland state election: Roma
Party	Candidate	Votes	%	±%
Country	William Ewan	3,629	44.5	
Labor	John Taylor	2,558	31.3	
Independent	Richard Condon	1,976	24.2	
Total formal votes		8,163	99.3	
Informal votes		61	0.7	
Turnout		8,224	92.8	
Country hold		Swing		

=== Elections in the 1950s ===
1957 Queensland state election: Roma
Party	Candidate	Votes	%	±%
Country	William Ewan	2,568	46.1	−3.8
Queensland Labor	Alfred Dohring	2,006	36.0	+36.0
Labor	William Hay	855	15.4	−34.7
Independent	James Clarke	141	2.5	+2.5
Total formal votes		5,570	99.2	−0.2
Informal votes		43	0.8	+0.2
Turnout		5,613	94.8	+1.3
Country gain from Labor		Swing	N/A	

1956 Queensland state election: Roma
Party	Candidate	Votes	%	±%
Labor	Alfred Dohring	2,624	50.1	−1.5
Country	William Ewan	2,610	49.9	+1.5
Total formal votes		5,234	99.4	+0.1
Informal votes		32	0.6	−0.1
Turnout		5,266	93.5	−0.6
Labor hold		Swing	−1.5	

1953 Queensland state election: Roma
Party	Candidate	Votes	%	±%
Labor	Alfred Dohring	2,555	51.6	+4.9
Country	William Ewan	2,393	48.4	−4.9
Total formal votes		4,948	99.3	+0.4
Informal votes		35	0.7	−0.4
Turnout		4,983	94.1	+0.4
Labor gain from Country		Swing	+4.9	

1950 Queensland state election: Roma
Party	Candidate	Votes	%	±%
Country	William Ewan	2,631	53.3	
Labor	James Kane	2,308	46.7	
Total formal votes		4,939	98.9	
Informal votes		54	1.1	
Turnout		4,993	93.7	
Country hold		Swing		
