= Electoral results for the district of Somerset =

Queensland state electoral results

This is a list of electoral results for the electoral district of Somerset in Queensland state elections.

== Members for Somerset ==
Member	Party	Term
Duncan MacDonald	Country	1950–1953
Alexander Skinner	Labor	1953–1957
Alexander Skinner	Queensland Labor	1957
Harold Richter	Country	1957–1972
Bill Gunn	Country	1972–1974
Bill Gunn	National	1974–1992

== Election results ==
=== Elections in the 1980s ===
1989 Queensland state election: Somerset
Party	Candidate	Votes	%	±%
Labor	Lyn Kally	7,770	36.8	+0.8
National	Bill Gunn	7,359	34.8	−29.2
Liberal	Neil Zabel	3,252	15.4	+15.4
Independent	Jean Bray	1,435	6.8	+6.8
Independent	Rob Lucas	787	3.7	+3.7
Independent	Noel Qualischefski	516	2.4	+2.4
Total formal votes		21,119	96.6	−0.4
Informal votes		755	3.4	+0.4
Turnout		21,874	92.7	+0.3
Two-party-preferred result
National	Bill Gunn	11,396	54.0	−10.0
Labor	Lyn Kally	9,723	46.0	+10.0
National hold		Swing	−10.0	

1986 Queensland state election: Somerset
Party	Candidate	Votes	%	±%
National	Bill Gunn	11,720	64.0	+9.7
Labor	Ron Hazelden	6,594	36.0	−1.1
Total formal votes		18,314	97.0	
Informal votes		573	3.0	
Turnout		18,887	92.4	
National hold		Swing	−2.5	

1983 Queensland state election: Somerset
Party	Candidate	Votes	%	±%
National	Bill Gunn	12,490	54.3	+4.3
Labor	Ron Hazelden	8,538	37.1	+7.7
Liberal	Clive Herrald	1,976	8.6	−12.0
Total formal votes		23,004	98.6	−0.3
Informal votes		323	1.4	+0.3
Turnout		23,327	92.1	+1.2
Two-party-preferred result
National	Bill Gunn	14,025	61.0	−4.0
Labor	Ron Hazelden	8,979	39.0	+4.0
National hold		Swing	−4.0	

1980 Queensland state election: Somerset
Party	Candidate	Votes	%	±%
National	Bill Gunn	9,381	50.0	−12.4
Labor	Ron Hazelden	5,508	29.4	+3.3
Liberal	Owen Nugent	3,854	20.6	+20.6
Total formal votes		18,743	98.9	0.0
Informal votes		213	1.1	0.0
Turnout		18,956	90.9	−1.3
Two-party-preferred result
National	Bill Gunn	12,175	65.0	−2.9
Labor	Ron Hazelden	6,568	35.0	+2.9
National hold		Swing	−2.9	

=== Elections in the 1970s ===
1977 Queensland state election: Somerset
Party	Candidate	Votes	%	±%
National	Bill Gunn	9,599	62.4	−12.3
Labor	Ronald Hazelden	4,024	26.1	+7.9
Democrats	Thomas Flynn-O'Connor	1,771	11.5	+11.5
Total formal votes		15,394	98.5	
Informal votes		226	1.5	
Turnout		15,620	92.7	
Two-party-preferred result
National	Bill Gunn	10,449	67.9	−8.2
Labor	Ronald Hazelden	4,945	32.1	+8.2
National hold		Swing	−8.2	

1974 Queensland state election: Somerset
Party	Candidate	Votes	%	±%
National	Bill Gunn	9,656	74.7	+18.2
Labor	Gordon Abbott	2,348	18.2	−13.4
Independent	Keith Hughes	918	7.1	+7.1
Total formal votes		12,922	99.2	+0.2
Informal votes		107	0.8	−0.2
Turnout		13,029	93.2	−0.3
Two-party-preferred result
National	Bill Gunn	10,115	78.3	+12.0
Labor	Gordon Abbott	2,807	21.7	−12.0
National hold		Swing	+12.0	

1972 Queensland state election: Somerset
Party	Candidate	Votes	%	±%
Country	Bill Gunn	6,925	56.5	−4.1
Labor	Henry Riis	3,874	31.6	−7.8
Queensland Labor	Roland Forgan	1,263	10.3	+10.3
Independent	Robert Wilkie	198	1.6	+1.6
Total formal votes		12,260	99.0	
Informal votes		128	1.0	
Turnout		12,388	93.5	
Two-party-preferred result
Country	Bill Gunn	8,133	66.3	+5.7
Labor	Henry Riis	4,127	33.7	−5.7
Country hold		Swing	+5.7	

=== Elections in the 1960s ===
1969 Queensland state election: Somerset
Party	Candidate	Votes	%	±%
Country	Harold Richter	5,014	59.9	0.0
Labor	Norman Cush	3,351	40.1	+7.7
Total formal votes		8,365	98.8	−0.1
Informal votes		101	1.2	+0.1
Turnout		8,466	94.8	0.0
Country hold		Swing	−5.0	

1966 Queensland state election: Somerset
Party	Candidate	Votes	%	±%
Country	Harold Richter	5,076	59.9	−0.2
Labor	Jacobus Van Der Lelie	2,742	32.4	−7.5
Independent	John Rasmussen	380	4.5	+4.5
Queensland Labor	Naomi Grulke	274	3.2	+3.2
Total formal votes		8,472	98.9	−0.4
Informal votes		97	1.1	+0.4
Turnout		8,569	94.8	−1.0
Two-party-preferred result
Country	Harold Richter	5,497	64.9	+4.8
Labor	Jacobus Van Der Lelie	2,975	35.1	−4.8
Country hold		Swing	+4.8	

1963 Queensland state election: Somerset
Party	Candidate	Votes	%	±%
Country	Harold Richter	5,336	60.1	+5.0
Labor	John Walters	3,536	39.9	+20.9
Total formal votes		8,872	99.3	+0.7
Informal votes		60	0.7	−0.7
Turnout		8,932	95.8	+1.7
Country hold		Swing	N/A	

1960 Queensland state election: Somerset
Party	Candidate	Votes	%	±%
Country	Harold Richter	4,860	55.1	
Queensland Labor	Alexander Skinner	2,291	26.0	
Labor	Robert Warren	1,672	19.0	
Total formal votes		8,823	98.6	
Informal votes		126	1.4	
Turnout		8,949	94.1	
Country hold		Swing		

=== Elections in the 1950s ===
1957 Queensland state election: Somerset
Party	Candidate	Votes	%	±%
Country	Harold Richter	3,700	41.0	−3.1
Queensland Labor	Alexander Skinner	3,246	36.0	+36.0
Labor	Evan Marginson	2,078	23.0	−32.9
Total formal votes		9,024	99.5	+0.2
Informal votes		42	0.5	−0.2
Turnout		9,066	95.4	+0.7
Country gain from Labor		Swing	N/A	

1956 Queensland state election: Somerset
Party	Candidate	Votes	%	±%
Labor	Alexander Skinner	4,921	55.9	+4.9
Country	Nigel McConnel	3,887	44.1	−4.9
Total formal votes		8,808	99.3	+0.2
Informal votes		63	0.7	−0.2
Turnout		8,871	94.7	+0.8
Labor hold		Swing	+4.9	

1953 Queensland state election: Somerset
Party	Candidate	Votes	%	±%
Labor	Alexander Skinner	4,522	51.0	+8.8
Country	James Brough	4,353	49.0	−8.8
Total formal votes		8,875	99.1	−0.1
Informal votes		78	0.9	+0.1
Turnout		8,953	93.9	+0.4
Labor gain from Country		Swing	+8.8	

1950 Queensland state election: Somerset
Party	Candidate	Votes	%	±%
Country	Duncan MacDonald	5,113	57.7	
Labor	John Perrett	3,740	42.3	
Total formal votes		8,853	99.2	
Informal votes		72	0.8	
Turnout		8,925	93.5	
Country hold		Swing		
