= Electoral results for the district of Townsville South =

Queensland, Australia, district election results

This is a list of electoral results for the electoral district of Townsville South in Queensland state elections.

== Members for Townsville South ==
Member	Party	Term
Tom Aikens	NQLP	1960–1977
Alex Wilson	Labor	1977–1986

== Election results ==
=== Elections in the 1980s ===
1983 Queensland state election: Townsville South
Party	Candidate	Votes	%	±%
Labor	Alex Wilson	7,683	55.5	+6.6
National	Dickway Goon-Chew	5,205	37.6	+12.1
Liberal	Theo Theofanes	967	7.0	−12.3
Total formal votes		13,855	98.8	+0.2
Informal votes		164	1.2	−0.2
Turnout		14,019	90.5	+4.2
Two-party-preferred result
Labor	Alex Wilson	7,899	57.0	−0.6
National	Dickway Goon-Chew	5,956	43.0	+0.6
Labor hold		Swing	−0.6	

1980 Queensland state election: Townsville South
Party	Candidate	Votes	%	±%
Labor	Alex Wilson	6,667	48.9	−0.5
National	Alan Metcalfe	3,481	25.5	+25.5
Liberal	Hector Garrick	2,630	19.3	+19.3
Independent	Francis Rossiter	864	6.3	+6.3
Total formal votes		13,642	98.6	+0.7
Informal votes		192	1.4	−0.7
Turnout		13,834	86.3	−2.3
Two-party-preferred result
Labor	Alex Wilson	7,861	57.6	+6.6
National	Alan Metcalfe	5,781	42.4	−6.6
Labor hold		Swing	+6.6	

=== Elections in the 1970s ===
1977 Queensland state election: Townsville South
Party	Candidate	Votes	%	±%
Labor	Alex Wilson	6,621	49.4	+8.8
Independent	Tom Aikens	6,173	46.0	−2.5
Independent	Eric Milne	623	4.6	+4.6
Total formal votes		13,417	97.9	
Informal votes		283	2.1	
Turnout		13,700	88.6	
Two-candidate-preferred result
Labor	Alex Wilson	6,837	51.0	+1.6
Independent	Tom Aikens	6,580	49.0	−1.6
Labor gain from Independent		Swing	+1.6	

1974 Queensland state election: Townsville South
Party	Candidate	Votes	%	±%
Independent	Tom Aikens	5,881	48.5	−2.5
Labor	Alex Wilson	4,924	40.6	−0.1
Australia	Leonard Weber	691	5.7	+5.7
Queensland Labor	John Judge	628	5.2	−3.1
Total formal votes		12,124	97.5	−1.2
Informal votes		306	2.5	+1.2
Turnout		12,430	85.7	−8.2
Two-candidate-preferred result
Independent	Tom Aikens	6,770	55.8	−1.8
Labor	Alex Wilson	5,354	44.2	+1.8
Independent hold		Swing	−1.8	

1972 Queensland state election: Townsville South
Party	Candidate	Votes	%	±%
Independent	Tom Aikens	5,500	51.0	−2.1
Labor	Alex Wilson	4,391	40.7	+6.0
Queensland Labor	Kerry Smith	890	8.3	−2.6
Total formal votes		10,781	98.7	
Informal votes		144	1.3	
Turnout		10,925	93.9	
Two-candidate-preferred result
Independent	Tom Aikens	6,210	57.6	−1.6
Labor	Alex Wilson	4,571	42.4	+1.6
Independent hold		Swing	−1.6	

=== Elections in the 1960s ===
1969 Queensland state election: Townsville South
Party	Candidate	Votes	%	±%
Independent	Tom Aikens	8,085	53.1	−10.1
Labor	Leslie Moon	5,281	34.7	−0.8
Queensland Labor	Bryan Hurney	1,653	10.9	+10.9
Communist	Francis Bishop	206	1.3	0.0
Total formal votes		15,225	98.5	−0.2
Informal votes		224	1.5	+0.2
Turnout		15,449	90.7	−3.0
Two-candidate-preferred result
Independent	Tom Aikens	9,013	59.2	−4.7
Labor	Leslie Moon	6,212	40.8	+4.7
Independent hold		Swing	−4.7	

1966 Queensland state election: Townsville South
Party	Candidate	Votes	%	±%
Independent	Tom Aikens	9,260	63.2	+3.0
Labor	Arthur Trower	5,196	35.5	−4.3
Communist	Francis Bishop	194	1.3	+1.3
Total formal votes		14,650	98.7	+0.3
Informal votes		186	1.3	−0.3
Turnout		14,836	93.7	−0.3
Two-candidate-preferred result
Independent	Tom Aikens	9,361	63.9	+3.7
Labor	Arthur Trower	5,289	36.1	−3.7
Independent hold		Swing	+3.7	

1963 Queensland state election: Townsville South
Party	Candidate	Votes	%	±%
NQ Labor	Tom Aikens	8,229	60.2	−6.6
Labor	Arthur Trower	5,450	39.8	+6.6
Total formal votes		13,679	99.0	+0.7
Informal votes		140	1.0	−0.7
Turnout		13,819	94.0	+0.7
NQ Labor hold		Swing	−6.6	

1960 Queensland state election: Townsville South
Party	Candidate	Votes	%	±%
NQ Labor	Tom Aikens	8,501	66.8	
Labor	Bill Edmonds	4,216	33.2	
Total formal votes		12,717	98.3	
Informal votes		223	1.7	
Turnout		12,940	93.3	
NQ Labor win		(new seat)		
