= 1953 Queensland state election =

← 1950	7 March 1953	1956 →

All 75 seats in the Legislative Assembly of Queensland 38 Assembly seats were needed for a majority
- Turnout: 93.80 (▲1.29 pp)
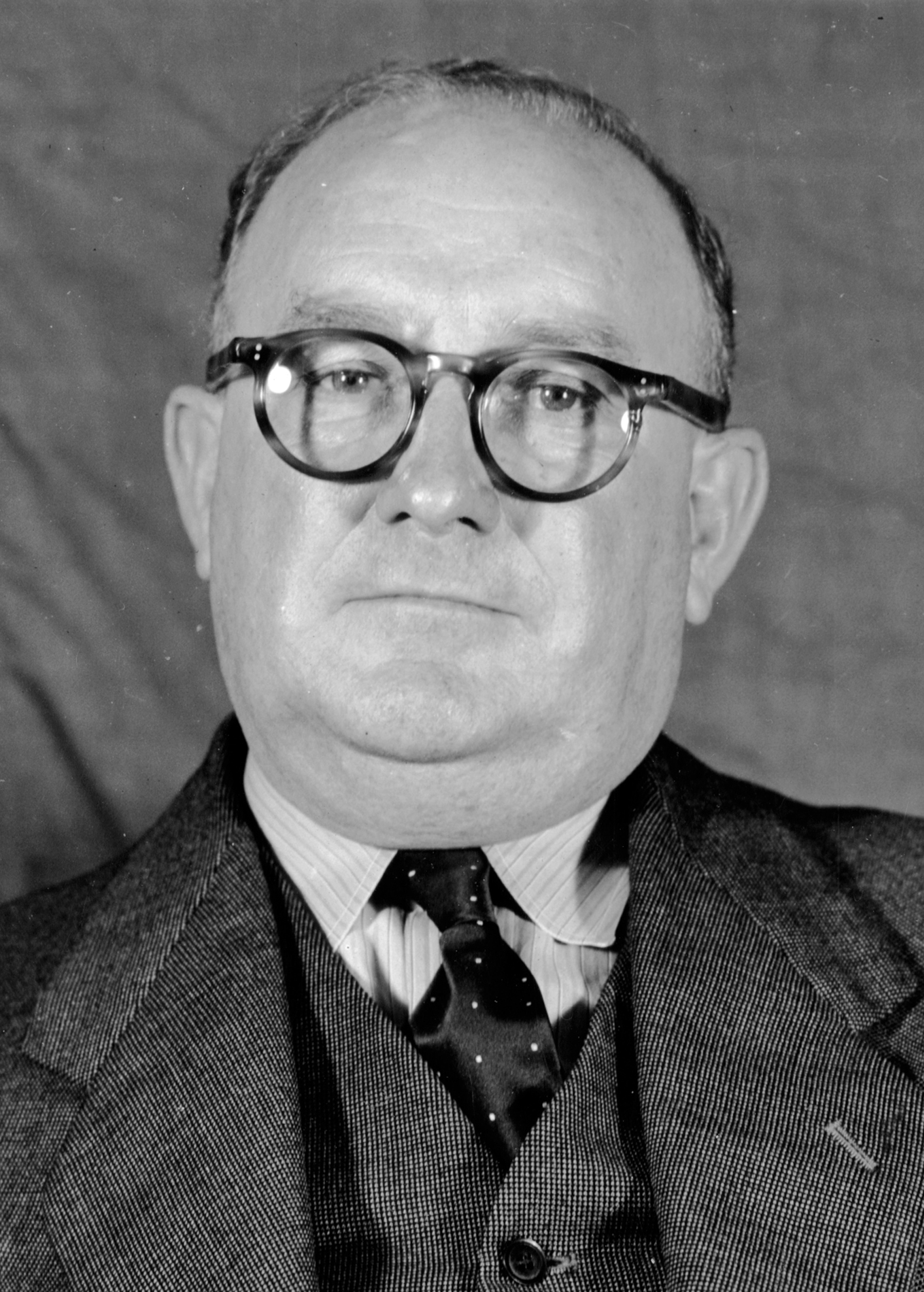

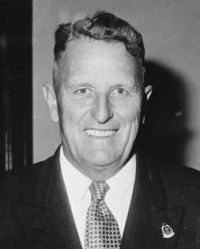
	First party	Second party
Leader	Vince Gair	Frank Nicklin
Party	Labor	Country–Liberal Coalition
Leader since	17 January 1952	21 May 1941
Leader's seat	South Brisbane	Landsborough
Last election	42 seats	31 seats
Seats won	50	23
Seat change	▲8	▼8
Popular vote	323,882	243,757
Percentage	53.21%	40.05%
Swing	▲6.34	▼9.11
Premier before election
Vince Gair
Labor
Elected Premier
Vince Gair
Labor

Elections were held in the Australian state of Queensland on 7 March 1953 to elect the 75 members of the state's Legislative Assembly. The Labor government was seeking its eighth continuous term in office since the 1932 election. It was the first electoral test for Vince Gair, who had become Premier of Queensland 14 months earlier after the death of Ned Hanlon.

== Key dates ==
Date	Event
6 February 1953	The Parliament was dissolved.
6 February 1953	Writs were issued by the Governor to proceed with an election.
13 February 1953	Close of nominations.
7 March 1953	Polling day, between the hours of 8am and 6pm.
16 March 1953	The Gair Ministry was reconstituted.
5 June 1953	The writ was returned and the results formally declared.
4 August 1953	Parliament was summoned for business.

== Results ==
The result was a considerable swing to the Labor government.

Queensland state election, 7 March 1953 Legislative Assembly << 1950–1956 >>
Enrolled voters	657,349^{[1]}				
Votes cast	616,611		Turnout	93.80	+1.29
Informal votes	7,912		Informal	1.28	+0.17
Summary of votes by party
Party	Primary votes	%	Swing	Seats	Change
Labor	323,882	53.21%	+6.34	50	+8
Liberal	129,633	21.30%	–8.61	8	–3
Country	114,124	18.75%	–0.50	15	–5
NQ Labor	6,680	1.10%	–0.12	1	±0
Social Credit	4,103	0.67%	+0.67	0	±0
Communist	3,948	0.65%	+0.28	0	±0
Independent Labor	824	0.13%	–0.42	0	±0
Independent	25,505	4.19%	+2.90	1	±0
Total	608,699			75	

Popular vote
Labor	53.21%
Liberal	21.30%
Country	18.75%
NQ Labor	1.10%
Social Credit	0.67%
Communist	0.65%
Independents	4.33%

Seats
Labor	66.67%
Country	20.00%
Liberal	10.67%
NQ Labor	1.33%
Independents	1.33%

^{1} 737,579 electors were enrolled to vote at the election; however, 11 seats (14.7% of the total) were uncontested, eight of them Labor-held seats representing 49,466 enrolled voters, as well as two Country seats representing 20,053 voters and one Liberal seat representing 10,711 voters.

== Seats changing party representation ==
This table lists changes in party representation at the 1953 election.

Seat	Incumbent member	Party	New member	Party
Condamine	Eric Allpass	Country	Les Diplock	Labor
Cook	Carlisle Wordsworth	Country	Bunny Adair	Labor
Mulgrave	Bob Watson	Country	Charles English	Labor
Norman	Louis Luckins	Liberal	Bill Baxter	Labor
Roma	William Ewan	Country	Alfred Dohring	Labor
Sandgate	Eric Decker	Liberal	Herbert Robinson	Labor
Somerset	Duncan MacDonald	Country	Alexander Skinner	Labor

- Members listed in italics did not recontest their seats.
- In addition, Labor retained the seat of Kedron, which it had won from the Liberals at the 1951 by-election.

== See also ==
- Members of the Queensland Legislative Assembly, 1950–1953
- Members of the Queensland Legislative Assembly, 1953–1956
- Candidates of the Queensland state election, 1953
- Gair Ministry
