= Electoral results for the district of Crows Nest =

Queensland, Australia, district election results

This is a list of electoral results for the electoral district of Crows Nest in Queensland state elections.

== Members for Crows Nest ==
Member	Party	Term
Russell Cooper	National Party	1992–2001

== Election results ==
=== Elections in the 1990s ===
Results for the 1998 election were:

1998 Queensland state election: Crows Nest
Party	Candidate	Votes	%	±%
One Nation	David Cockburn	9,342	39.50	+39.50
National	Russell Cooper	9,060	38.31	−33.25
Labor	Fiona Bucknall	3,908	16.53	−4.67
Greens	John Langford	704	2.98	−4.26
Reform	Brenda Moloney	635	2.69	+2.69
Total formal votes		23,649	99.02	+0.16
Informal votes		234	0.98	−0.16
Turnout		23,883	94.83	+1.08
Two-candidate-preferred result
National	Russell Cooper	10,940	50.88	−24.67
One Nation	David Cockburn	10,563	49.12	+49.12
National hold		Swing	−24.67	

1995 Queensland state election: Crows Nest
Party	Candidate	Votes	%	±%
National	Russell Cooper	15,820	71.56	+16.45
Labor	John Martin	4,688	21.20	−7.14
Greens	Robert Rowston	1,600	7.24	+7.24
Total formal votes		22,108	98.86	+1.19
Informal votes		254	1.14	−1.19
Turnout		22,362	93.75	+0.55
Two-party-preferred result
National	Russell Cooper	16,415	75.55	+6.97
Labor	John Martin	5,311	24.45	−6.97
National hold		Swing	+6.97	

1992 Queensland state election: Crows Nest
Party	Candidate	Votes	%	±%
National	Russell Cooper	9,424	55.3	+11.9
Labor	Ross Spencer	4,787	28.1	+1.2
Liberal	Neville Stuart	2,817	16.5	−6.4
Total formal votes		20,254	97.7	
Informal votes		484	2.3	
Turnout		20,738	93.2	
Two-party-preferred result
National	Russell Cooper	13,483	68.6	+2.9
Labor	Ross Spencer	6,178	31.4	−2.9
National hold		Swing	+2.9	
