= Howard Richter =

Australian boxer

Personal information
- Nationality: Australian
- Born: 18 May 1935 (age 89)

Sport
- Sport: Boxing

Howard Richter (born 18 May 1935) is an Australian businessman and former Olympic boxer.

== Sporting career ==
Richter was introduced to boxing as a method of rehabilitation following a severe accident when he was eight years old. He was struck by a milk truck and spent six weeks in a coma. He later also broke his neck playing rugby league.

Richter competed in the men's middleweight event at the 1956 Summer Olympics. He lost in the first round to 1948 welterweight gold medallist Julius Torma on a points decision.

== Politics ==
Richter was Queensland state president of the Young Country Party in 1959, in which capacity he escorted Princess Alexandra on a royal tour. He was the Country Party candidate for the House of Representatives seat of Division of McPherson at the 1972 federal election, following the retirement of the incumbent Country MP Charles Barnes.

== Personal life ==
Richter is the son of Harold Richter, who was elected to the Queensland Legislative Assembly and served as a state government minister.

Richter and his brother Graham ran a farm machinery exporting business in Boonah, Queensland.
