= Alex Wilson (Australian politician) =

Australian politician

Member of the Queensland Legislative Assembly for Townsville South
- In office 12 November 1977 – 1 November 1986
- Preceded by: Tom Aikens
- Succeeded by: Seat abolished

Personal details
- Born: Alexander McLachlan Wilson; 11 December 1920 Rockhampton, Queensland, Australia
- Died: 29 February 2004 (aged 83) Townsville, Queensland, Australia
- Party: Labor
- Spouse: Sybil Maud Corney (m.1946 d.2006)
- Occupation: Locomotive fireman

Alexander McLachlan Wilson (11 December 1920 – 29 February 2004) was an Australian politician. He was a member of the Queensland Legislative Assembly.

== Biography ==
Wilson was born in Rockhampton, Queensland, the son of Robert Wilson and his wife Jane McWilliam (née McLachlan). He was educated at Stuart Creek State School and on leaving worked for the Queensland Railways as a locomotive fireman and also a railway wagon-builder.

On 8 May 1946 he married Sybil Maud Corney (died 2006) and together had three sons and four daughters. Wilson died in Townsville in February 2004.

== Public career ==
Wilson won the seat of Townsville South for the Labor Party at the 1977 Queensland state election, defeating the sitting member, Tom Aikens, who had served the parliament for over 33 years. He represented the electorate until the 1986 Queensland state election when Townsville South was abolished.

Always in opposition, Wilson was the shadow minister for the following portfolios:

- Opposition Spokesman for Water Resources and Aboriginal Affairs 1981–1982
- Opposition Spokesman for Works and Water Resources 1982
- Opposition Spokesman for Transport and Main Roads 1982
- Opposition Spokesman for Northern Development and Maritime Services 1982–1983
- Opposition Spokesman on Works and Workers' Compensation 1983

Parliament of Queensland
| Preceded by Tom Aikens | Member for Townsville South; 1977–1986 | Abolished |
