= Electoral district of Townsville South =

Former state electoral district of Queensland, Australia

Townsville South Queensland—Legislative Assembly
- State: Queensland
- Created: 1960
- Abolished: 1986
- Namesake: Townsville

Townsville South was an electoral district of the Legislative Assembly in the Australian state of Queensland from 1960 to 1986.

It covered the southern suburbs of the North Queensland city of Townsville, largely replacing the abolished district of Mundingburra.

Townsville South was abolished in the 1985 redistribution, and its territory mostly transferred to the new district of Townsville East.

== Members for Townsville South ==
Member	Party	Term
Tom Aikens	NQLP	1960–1977
Alex Wilson	ALP	1977–1986

== See also ==
- Electoral districts of Queensland
- Members of the Queensland Legislative Assembly by year
- Category:Members of the Queensland Legislative Assembly by name
