= Bill Gunn (Queensland politician, born 1920) =

Australian politician (1920–2001)

The Hon Bill Gunn AM
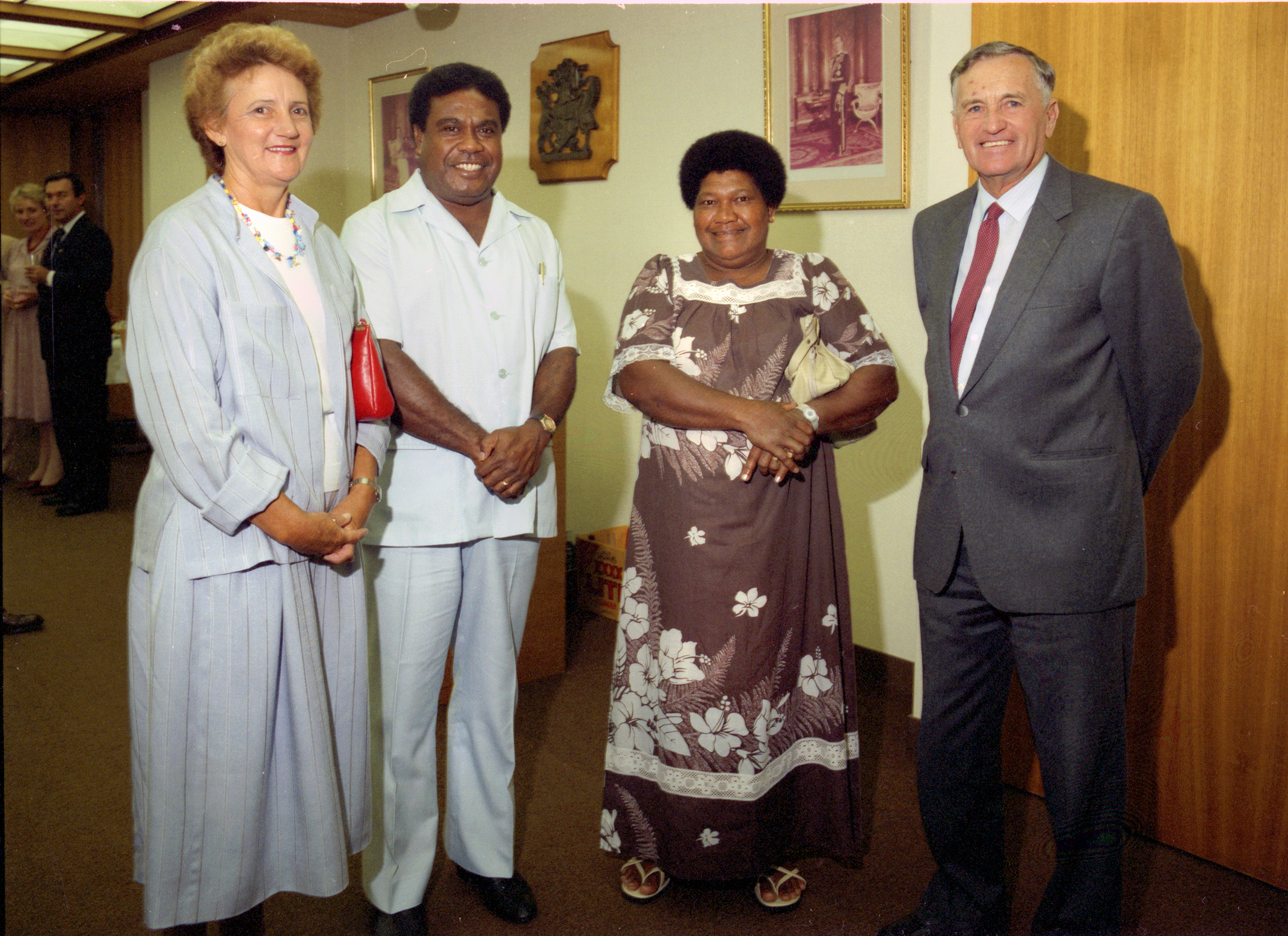
- Hon W. A. M. Gunn (right) meeting with Ati George Sokomanu in 1985

24th Deputy Premier of Queensland
- In office 18 August 1983 – 7 December 1989
- Premier: Joh Bjelke-Petersen; Mike Ahern; Russell Cooper
- Preceded by: Llew Edwards
- Succeeded by: Tom Burns

Minister for Finance and for Local Government
- In office 25 September 1989 – 7 December 1989
- Premier: Russell Cooper
- Preceded by: Brian Austin (Finance); Jim Randell (Local Government)
- Succeeded by: Tom Burns

Minister for Housing
- In office 19 January 1989 – 25 September 1989
- Premier: Mike Ahern
- Preceded by: Peter McKechnie
- Succeeded by: Jim Randell

Minister for Public Works and Main Roads
- In office 9 December 1987 – 25 September 1989
- Premier: Mike Ahern
- Preceded by: Ivan Gibbs (Public Works); Russ Hinze (Main Roads)
- Succeeded by: Jim Randell (Public Works); Gilbert Alison (Main Roads)

Minister for Police
- In office 6 February 1986 – 19 January 1989
- Premier: Joh Bjelke-Petersen; Mike Ahern
- Preceded by: Bill Glasson
- Succeeded by: Russell Cooper

Minister for Water Resources and Maritime Services
- In office 12 September 1985 – 6 February 1986
- Premier: Joh Bjelke-Petersen
- Preceded by: John Goleby
- Succeeded by: Martin Tenni

Minister for Commerce and Industry
- In office 6 December 1982 – 7 November 1983
- Premier: Joh Bjelke-Petersen
- Preceded by: Vic Sullivan
- Succeeded by: Mike Ahern

Deputy Leader of the Queensland National Party
- In office 1 December 1982 – 13 December 1989
- Leader: Joh Bjelke-Petersen; Mike Ahern; Russell Cooper
- Preceded by: Vic Sullivan
- Succeeded by: Rob Borbidge

Minister for Education
- In office 23 December 1980 – 6 December 1982
- Premier: Joh Bjelke-Petersen
- Preceded by: Val Bird
- Succeeded by: Lin Powell

Member of the Queensland Legislative Assembly for Somerset
- In office 21 May 1972 – 19 September 1992
- Preceded by: Harold Richter
- Succeeded by: Seat abolished

Personal details
- Born: William Angus Manson Gunn; 22 June 1920 Laidley, Queensland, Australia
- Died: 20 September 2001 (aged 81) Gatton, Queensland, Australia
- Party: Country Party/National Party
- Spouse: Lorna Klibbe
- Occupation: Councillor

William Angus Manson Gunn AM (22 June 1920 – 20 September 2001) was an Australian politician who represented the Queensland Legislative Assembly seat of Somerset from 1972 until 1992. A member of the National Party, he also served as a Minister and Deputy Premier in various Queensland administrations during the 1980s, and was instrumental in establishing the Fitzgerald Inquiry.

== Early life ==
William Angus Manson Gunn was born in Laidley, Queensland in the Lockyer Valley west of Brisbane, the youngest of seven children to Ewen William Gunn and his wife Rosia (née Geismann). He attended Laidley North Primary School and Gatton High School, and played representative rugby league football for Ipswich in the Bulimba Cup competition. At 21, he joined the Freemasons' Lodge, in which he was heavily involved until the start of his political career.

During World War II, he served in the First Cavalry Mobile Veterinary Service at Gympie, where he developed his knowledge of veterinary practice, which he continued privately after the war.

On 12 April 1952, he married Lorna Klibbe, whom he had met working in a local cafe. They had five children and, ultimately, 17 grandchildren.

== Politics ==
On 20 July 1966, Gunn was appointed to a vacancy on the Laidley Shire Council, and on 10 April 1970, he became Chairman of the Shire, a role in which he served until 1973.

At the 1972 state election, he was elected to the Legislative Assembly seat of Somerset, which covered much of the Lockyer Valley.

=== Government Minister ===
After the 1980 state election, he became Minister of Education on 23 December 1980. On 6 December 1982, he vacated this role in order that Lin Powell could enter the ministry, and took on the new portfolio of Commerce and Industry. At the same time he elected as deputy Nationals leader defeating Mike Ahern 18 votes to 16 on the third ballot.

=== Deputy Premier ===
On 18 August, following a split in the Coalition which saw all Liberal members removed from the Ministry, Gunn was promoted to Deputy Premier. He was also the Minister assisting the Treasurer. On 6 February 1986, he replaced Bill Glasson as Minister for Police, and served as the Queensland representative on the National Crime Authority.

During the Joh for Canberra campaign being planned by Premier Sir Joh Bjelke-Petersen and a number of his supporters, Gunn became acting premier and chaired cabinet meetings on a number of occasions. He was explicitly favoured by Bjelke-Petersen to succeed himself as Premier. However, concerns about corruption in the police force had been aired on Four Corners (in Chris Masters' "Moonlight State", aired on 11 May 1987) and in other media including the state newspaper The Courier-Mail. Gunn, who was described by the Courier-Mail as an "honest and thoroughly decent politician", wanted the allegations investigated and on 26 May 1987, at a meeting chaired by Gunn, the government agreed to a commission of inquiry which came to be known as the Fitzgerald Inquiry.

The hearings began two months later and ultimately were to prove the undoing of the conservative government which had been in power for over 30 years. Furthermore, Gunn also renominated Sir Robert Sparkes, by this stage not on good terms with Bjelke-Petersen, to another term as party president.

Bjelke-Petersen had been forced to name a retirement date of 8 August 1988, and at the Townsville conference of the National Party in November 1987, delegates approved Sparkes's position with regard to a number of issues, and rebuffed that of Bjelke-Petersen. Gunn told the Courier-Mail on 8 November that Sir Joh was "out of time" and that he should "go fishing, have a rest and do a fair bit of thinking". On 23–24 November, Bjelke-Petersen visited the Governor of Queensland Sir Walter Campbell, attempting to have five ministers sacked — including Gunn, for alleged disloyalty in nominating Sparkes as party president — and seeking support for an early election. The Governor, however, received advice from Gunn and fellow ministers Mike Ahern and Brian Austin that Bjelke-Petersen no longer had parliamentary support. He therefore interpreted the crisis as a political rather than constitutional one, and declined to intervene, suggesting the party room should resolve it. On 26 November, a caucus meeting was called to replace Bjelke-Petersen as leader — a spill motion was carried 39 votes to 8, and Ahern won the leadership with 30 votes to Gunn's 16 and Russ Hinze's 2. Gunn was then reelected unopposed as deputy leader.

Bjelke-Petersen finally stepped down on 1 December 1987. Campbell then swore Ahern and Gunn in as an interim two-man government while the process of reconfiguring the cabinet began. For the next week, Ahern and Gunn each assumed eight portfolios temporarily. When the full ministry was sworn in on 9 December, Gunn was appointed Deputy Premier, Minister for Public Works, Main Roads, Police and the World Expo 88 to be held in Brisbane. Among other things, he was responsible for a multimillion-dollar program to help local councils develop regional road infrastructure, and getting bullet-proof vests as standard issue for police officers. On 25 September 1989, following Russell Cooper's ascension to the premiership, he became Minister for Finance and Local Government.

The National Party was defeated at the December 1989 elections by the Labor Party led by Wayne Goss. Gunn's seat of Somerset was abolished in a redistribution designed to end the so-called Bjelkemander which had malapportioned seats in favour of country areas, and he retired at the 1992 election.

== Later life ==
Gunn's daughter Helen married a successful man from Badu Island, William Bowie. Badu Island is in the Torres Strait, and Gunn visited the islands many times, developing a love for the islands and their people, culture and history.

On 20 September 2001, he died at the Gatton Hospital and was buried privately after a State funeral at the Laidley Cultural Centre six days later.

== Legacy ==
The Bill Gunn Dam is named after him.

Parliament of Queensland
Preceded by Harold Richter	Member for Somerset; 1972–1992	Seat abolished
Political offices
Preceded by Llew Edwards	Deputy Premier of Queensland; 1983–1989	Succeeded by Tom Burns
