= Pat Weir =

Australian politician

The Honourable Pat Weir MP

40th Speaker of the Queensland Legislative Assembly
- Incumbent
- Assumed office 26 November 2024
- Deputy: Jon Krause
- Preceded by: Curtis Pitt

Member of the Legislative Assembly of Queensland for Condamine
- Incumbent
- Assumed office 31 January 2015
- Preceded by: Ray Hopper

Personal details
- Born: 25 February 1960 (age 66) Toowoomba, Queensland
- Party: Liberal National Party

Patrick Thomas Weir (born 25 February 1960) is an Australian politician who has served as Speaker of the Legislative Assembly of Queensland since 2024. He has been the Liberal National Party member for Condamine in the Queensland Legislative Assembly since 2015.

Parliament of Queensland
Preceded by Ray Hopper	Member for Condamine; 2015–present	Incumbent
