= Harold Richter =

Australian politician

The Honourable Sir Harold Richter

Member of the Queensland Legislative Assembly for Somerset
- In office 3 August 1957 – 27 May 1972
- Preceded by: Alexander Skinner
- Succeeded by: Bill Gunn

Personal details
- Born: Harold Richter; 17 January 1906 Ipswich, Queensland, Australia
- Died: 18 June 1979 (aged 73) Coorparoo, Queensland, Australia
- Party: Country Party
- Spouse: Gladys Barbara James (m.1933-1986; her death)
- Relations: Howard Richter (son)
- Occupation: Businessman

Sir Harold Richter (17 January 1906 – 18 June 1979) was a member of the Queensland Legislative Assembly.

== Biography ==
Richter was born at Ipswich, Queensland, the son of Federick Richter and his wife Pauline (née Rack). He attended school at Teviotville state school and Ipswich Grammar School, and became a farmer at Teviotville he later owned an agricultural, manufacturing and engineering business.

On 21 January 1933 Richter married Gladys Barbara James (died 1986) and together had two sons and two daughters. His son Howard Richter was an Olympic boxer and unsuccessful Country Party candidate for federal parliament.

Richter died at Coorparoo in June 1979 and was Cremated at the Mt Thompson Crematorium.

== Public life ==
Richter was the chairman of the Boonah Shire Council from 1943 until 1947.

At the 1957 Queensland state election, Richter, representing the Country Party, won the seat of Somerset at the 1957 Queensland state election. He held the seat until 1972.

He held the following roles in the Country Party and the Parliament:

- Vice-president of the Queensland Country Party 1951–1955
- President of the Queensland Country Party 1956–1960
- Minister for Public Works and Local Government 1961–1963
- Minister for Local Government and Conservation 1963–1969

Parliament of Queensland
Preceded by Alexander Skinner	Member for Somerset; 1957–1972	Succeeded by Bill Gunn
