= Ray Hopper =

Australian politician

Leader of Katter's Australian Party in Queensland
- In office 29 November 2012 – 2 February 2015
- Deputy: Shane Knuth
- Preceded by: Robbie Katter
- Succeeded by: Robbie Katter

Shadow Minister for Primary Industries, Fisheries and Food Security
- In office 6 April 2009 – 11 April 2011
- Leader: John-Paul Langbroek
- Succeeded by: Mark Robinson (Fisheries); Andrew Cripps (Fisheries and Food Security)

Member of the Queensland Legislative Assembly for Condamine Darling Downs (2001–2009)
- In office 17 February 2001 – 31 January 2015
- Preceded by: Seat abolished
- Succeeded by: Pat Weir

Personal details
- Born: 3 March 1960 (age 66) Jandowae, Queensland, Australia
- Party: Katter's Australian (2012–present)
- Other political affiliations: Independent (before 2001); National (2001–2008); Liberal National (2008–2012)
- Spouses: Joanne Deacon (m. 1986; div. 2010) Jeanette Sutherland (m. 2010)
- Children: 3

Raymond Gordon Hopper (born 3 March 1960) is a former Australian politician. He was a member of the Legislative Assembly of Queensland from 2001 to 2015. Originally elected as the member for Darling Downs as an independent in 2001, he joined the National Party later that year and the Liberal National Party in 2008.

== Political career ==
During his time in Parliament, Hopper held a range of roles in opposition, namely the Shadow Minister for Racing, the Shadow Minister for Natural Resources and Mines, the Shadow Minister for Employment and Training, the Shadow Minister for Natural Resources and Mines, the Shadow Minister for Natural Resources and Water, the Shadow Minister for Food Security and Agriculture, and the Shadow Minister for Primary Industries, Fisheries and Rural and Regional Queensland.

On the abolition of his seat of Darling Downs in 2008, Hopper followed most of his constituents into the revived seat of Condamine. On 24 November 2012, Hopper resigned from the LNP and joined Katter's Australian Party. Hopper claimed that the LNP had been a takeover by the old Liberal Party at the expense of the National Party, even though most LNP MPs were former Nationals like him. He accused the LNP of deliberately purging National influence from the party. Hopper claimed to have spoken to eight other LNP backbenchers who were considering defection, but this did not eventuate.

On 29 November it was announced that he had become the party's leader in Queensland, taking over from Robbie Katter, the son of the party's founder, Bob Katter. He contested Nanango for the party in 2015, but was defeated.

=== Electoral history ===
Queensland Legislative Assembly
| Election year | Electorate | Party | Votes | FP% | +/- | 2PP% | +/- | Result |
|---|---|---|---|---|---|---|---|---|
| 2001 | Darling Downs | Ind | 9,069 | 40.00 | ▲40.00 | 51.10 | ▲51.10 | First |
| 2004 | Darling Downs | Nat | 11,671 | 50.50 | ▲11.50 | 67.90 | ▲18.90 | First |
| 2006 | Darling Downs | Nat | 13,883 | 59.54 | ▲9.02 | 69.14 | ▲1.37 | First |
| 2009 | Condamine | LNP | 14,360 | 47.70 | ▼11.60 | 61.60 | ▼7.10 | First |
| 2012 | Condamine | LNP | 18,408 | 58.30 | ▲10.64 | 70.10 | ▲8.54 | First |
| 2015 | Nanango | KAP | 4,827 | 15.47 | ▼10.86 | N/A | N/A | Third |

== Personal life ==
Hopper married his first wife Joanne in 1986. They had three children, Jodi, Amy and Ben. In 2010, Hopper split from his wife after a longstanding affair with his later-second wife, Jeanette Sutherland.

Ben Hopper was a candidate in the seat of Condamine at the 2015 state election in an effort to replace his father, who stood unsuccessfully in Nanango.

Parliament of Queensland
| New seat | Member for Darling Downs; 2001–2009 | Seat abolished |
| New seat | Member for Condamine; 2009–2015 | Succeeded by Pat Weir |
Party political offices
| Preceded by Rob Katter | Leader of Katter's Australian Party in Queensland; 2012–2015 | Succeeded by Rob Katter |
