= Ken Tomkins =

Australian politician (1917–1990)

Member of the Queensland Legislative Assembly for Roma
- In office 24 June 1967 – 22 October 1983
- Preceded by: William Ewan
- Succeeded by: Russell Cooper

Personal details
- Born: Kenneth Burgoyne Tomkins; 14 September 1917 Sydney, New South Wales, Australia
- Died: 20 July 1990 (aged 72) Toowoomba, Queensland, Australia
- Party: Country Party/National Party
- Spouse: Lillian Jean Robinson
- Occupation: Grazier

Kenneth Burgoyne Tomkins (14 September 1917 – 20 July 1990) was an Australian politician who served as a member of the Queensland Legislative Assembly.

== Politics ==
Ken Tomkins was a member of the Bungil Shire Council from 1949 to 1967 and its chairman from 1967 to 1975.

On 14 March 1967, the Country Party member for Roma in the Queensland Legislative Assembly, William Ewan, died. Standing as the Country Party candidate, Ken Tomkins won the resulting by-election on 24 June 1967. He held that seat until 22 October 1983, when he did not contest the 1983 election.

Parliament of Queensland
Preceded by William Ewan	Member for Roma; 1967–1983	Succeeded by Russell Cooper
