= Russell Cooper =

Australian politician (born 1941)

The Honourable Russell Cooper AM

33rd Premier of Queensland
- In office 25 September 1989 – 7 December 1989
- Monarch: Elizabeth II
- Governor: Walter Campbell
- Deputy: Bill Gunn
- Preceded by: Mike Ahern
- Succeeded by: Wayne Goss

27th Leader of the Opposition in Queensland
- In office 7 December 1989 – 10 December 1991
- Deputy: Rob Borbidge
- Preceded by: Wayne Goss
- Succeeded by: Rob Borbidge

Minister for Police of Queensland
- In office 16 February 1996 – 26 June 1998
- Premier: Rob Borbidge
- Preceded by: Paul Braddy
- Succeeded by: Tom Barton
- In office 19 January 1989 – 29 August 1989
- Premier: Mike Ahern
- Preceded by: Bill Gunn
- Succeeded by: Vince Lester

40th Treasurer of Queensland
- In office 25 September 1989 – 7 December 1989
- Preceded by: Mike Ahern
- Succeeded by: Keith De Lacy

10th Leader of the National Party in Queensland Elections: 1989
- In office 25 September 1989 – 10 December 1991
- Deputy: Bill Gunn; Rob Borbidge
- Preceded by: Mike Ahern
- Succeeded by: Rob Borbidge

Minister for Corrective Services of Queensland
- In office 9 December 1987 – 19 January 1989
- Premier: Mike Ahern
- Preceded by: Don Neal
- Succeeded by: Paul Clauson

Member of the Queensland Parliament for Crows Nest Roma (1983–1992)
- In office 22 October 1983 – 17 February 2001
- Preceded by: Ken Tomkins
- Succeeded by: Seat abolished

Personal details
- Born: Theo Russell Cooper; 4 February 1941 (age 85) Brisbane, Queensland, Australia
- Party: National Party
- Occupation: Cattle breeder

Theo Russell Cooper (born 4 February 1941) is an Australian retired National Party politician. He was Premier of Queensland for a period of 73 days, from 25 September 1989 to 7 December 1989. His loss at the state election of 1989 ended 32 years of continuous National Party rule over Queensland.

== Biography ==
Cooper, a cattle breeder, followed the customary path to politics in the National Party, becoming involved in the Bendemere Shire Council before being elected for the seat of Roma in 1983. At various times, Cooper was Chairman of the National Party's Wallumbilla/Yuleba branch and Vice-President of the National Party's Roma Electorate Council. At the time of Cooper's election to the seat of Roma, Queensland was under the reign of long-serving Premier Joh Bjelke-Petersen.

By the late 1980s, the once impregnable Bjelke-Petersen government had begun to falter amid the failure of Bjelke-Petersen's ill-fated foray into national politics, and the establishment of the Fitzgerald Inquiry into police corruption, which implicated a great many senior governmental and police figures in widespread official corruption. In December 1987, the National Party replaced Bjelke-Petersen as leader and Premier with Mike Ahern. Ahern appointed Cooper to cabinet as part of an influx of younger National parliamentarians who had not been associated with the previous Cabinet. Cooper was given the difficult portfolio of Corrective Services.

His moderation and focus on consensus leadership was to many Nationals a rude shock after the strong-willed approach of his predecessor. Bjelke-Petersen worked publicly to undermine and destabilise the National Party leadership, and still held the allegiance of many Nationals supporters.

In the beginning of 1989, Cooper was promoted to Minister for Police, another challenging portfolio that had been at the heart of the turmoil associated with the Fitzgerald Inquiry. The report was particularly damaging, since the Nationals faced a statutory general election later that year. A Newspoll released after the inquiry came out showed the Nationals at only 22 percent—the lowest result ever recorded at the time for a state government in Australia. Moving Cooper to the Police Ministry was seen as an attempt by Ahern to remove the stigma of Fitzgerald from the area. The effect, however, was to raise Cooper's personal profile among Nationals supporters disaffected with Ahern. Polls showing Labor having its best chance in years to win government; indeed, if the result of the Newspoll were to be repeated at the election, the Nationals would have been swept out in a massive landslide. Cooper was promoted as an alternative leader to Ahern. In particular, it was thought he could shore up the National Party's vote in its conservative rural heartland. Portraying himself as a strong leader who was closer to the Bjelke-Petersen mould, Cooper launched a leadership challenge and toppled Ahern as party leader on 25 September. He was sworn in as premier later that day.

=== Premiership ===
All three political parties in Queensland had changed their leaders by 1989 — in addition to the Nationals, the Liberals were now led by Angus Innes and Labor by Wayne Goss. Cooper had a dimmer view of the proposed Fitzgerald reforms than Ahern and put off their implementation. Although the legislation establishing the Criminal Justice Commission (CJC) was passed under Cooper, he would later have an adversarial relationship with the Commission itself. Although Cooper's elevation did have some effect within rural electorates, the Nationals' overall fortunes continued to tail off.

Cooper waited as long as he could to call an election, finally doing so for 2 December. The Nationals campaigned on traditional focuses: law and order, social conservatism, and attacks on the federal Labor government. The Nationals produced a number of controversial advertisements, one of which alleged that the Labor Opposition's plan to decriminalise homosexuality would lead to a flood of gays from southern states moving to Queensland. These advertisements were satirised by Labor ads depicting Cooper as a wild-eyed reactionary.

In the election, the Nationals were heavily defeated, suffering the worst defeat of a sitting government in Queensland. This was mainly due to a massive Labor wave that swept through Brisbane; Labor took all but five of the capital's 36 seats. However, Cooper was not blamed for the debacle—which was widely seen as a vote against Bjelke-Petersen—and stayed on as Leader of the Opposition.

=== Post-premiership ===
In 1991, allegations were made in The Courier-Mail that a large number of Queensland parliamentarians from all parties had abused their travel entitlements (the "travel rorts affair"). The CJC began an investigation, and although the names of those under investigation were suppressed, it became obvious through indirect published hints that one of them was Cooper. On 9 December Cooper announced that he was under investigation for the funding of a trip to Hamilton Island with his wife, refunded the cost of the trip, and stood down as National Party leader. This was widely seen as a tactical move aimed at shaming senior members of the government such as Terry Mackenroth. Cooper was succeeded by Rob Borbidge. The CJC subsequently cleared Cooper of impropriety.

Following the redistribution, which followed legislation designed to rid Queensland's electoral system of malapportionment in favour of rural areas, Cooper transferred to Crows Nest at the 1992 election. He returned to the Nationals' front bench in November of that year as Shadow Minister for Police. In February 1996, when Borbidge formed a minority government after winning a closely fought by-election in Mundingburra, Cooper became Minister for Police, Corrective Services, and Racing.

Soon afterwards Cooper was named in what would become the central scandal of the Borbidge government, when it was revealed that during the Mundingburra by-election campaign, Borbidge and Cooper had signed a secret Memorandum of Understanding with the Queensland Police Union guaranteeing the QPU the repeal of unpopular Goss government measures, the power of veto over senior police appointments, and increased police funding in return for a donation of A$20,000 to the by-election campaign. This close relationship evoked many memories of the Bjelke-Petersen era, where relations between the executive and the police service were (sometimes improperly) close. When the matter came under investigation by the CJC (the Carruthers Inquiry), Cooper led strident attacks on the body and its independence. Cooper ignored repeated Opposition calls for him to resign.

In 1998, the Coalition suffered an 11-seat swing, and Labor's Peter Beattie formed a minority government. Cooper became Shadow Minister for Primary Industries but stepped down from the front bench in December 1999. He retired from Parliament in the state election of 2001.

== Personal life ==
He has 4 children, 12 grandchildren (Madeline Sarah-Anning Cooper) and 2 great-grandchildren.

Political offices
Preceded by Mike Ahern	Premier of Queensland; 1989	Succeeded by Wayne Goss
Preceded by Mike Ahern	Treasurer of Queensland; 1989	Succeeded by Keith De Lacy
Preceded by Wayne Goss	Leader of the Opposition in Queensland; 1989–1991	Succeeded by Rob Borbidge
Party political offices
Preceded by Mike Ahern	Leader of the National Party in Queensland; 1989–1991	Succeeded by Rob Borbidge
Parliament of Queensland
New district	Member for Crows Nest; 1992–2001	District abolished
Preceded by Ken Tomkins	Member for Roma; 1983–1992	District abolished
