= Vic Sullivan =

Australian politician

The Honourable Vic Sullivan

Deputy Leader of the Queensland National Party
- In office August 1980 – 1 December 1982
- Leader: Joh Bjelke-Petersen
- Preceded by: Ron Camm
- Succeeded by: Bill Gunn

Member of the Queensland Legislative Assembly for Condamine
- In office 28 May 1960 – 22 October 1983
- Preceded by: Les Diplock
- Succeeded by: Brian Littleproud

Personal details
- Born: Victor Bruce Sullivan; 7 December 1918 Launceston, Tasmania, Australia
- Died: 29 January 1993 (aged 74) Caloundra, Queensland, Australia
- Party: Country Party/National Party
- Spouse: Gwenneth Joan Becker (m.1948)
- Occupation: Farmer

Victor Bruce Sullivan (7 December 1918 – 29 January 1993) was a member of the Queensland Legislative Assembly.

== Biography ==
Sullivan was born in Launceston, Tasmania, the son of James Bruce Sullivan and his wife Julia Ellen (née Brown). He was educated at Downlands College in Toowoomba and on leaving school became a grain, beef, pork, and lamb farmer. He served in the Second Australian Imperial Force during WW2 as an attachment to the U.S. forces and was engaged in the movement of troops and supplies in New Guinea.

On 8 April 1948 Sullivan married Gwenneth Joan Becker and together had a two sons and a daughter. His daughter died in 1970 in an automobile accident. He died from a heart attack while surfing at Caloundra in January 1993.

== Public career ==
At the 1960 Queensland state election, Sullivan won the seat of Condamine for the Country Party, defeating the sitting member, Les Diplock of the Queensland Labor Party. He had a long career in the Queensland Parliament and retired at the 1983 Queensland state election.

In July 1982 he and fellow National Party member and ministerial colleague, Ken Tomkins, were involved in a scandal that came to be known as the Melbidir affair. They were on a tour in the government vessel the Melbidir to examine the conditions of Aboriginal communities in the Torres Strait islands when they were photographed from a plane flying overhead leisurely fishing from the vessel. Both men were reluctantly forced to resign from cabinet with Sullivan sitting on the back bench for the rest of his political career.

Sullivan didn't mind a drink and during the motion of condolence for him in the parliament in 1993, Tom Burns, the then Deputy Premier of Queensland, reminisced about the time Sullivan fell asleep while giving a speech in the parliament.

At one stage he was mooted to take over as Premier of Queensland from Joh Bjelke-Petersen and served as the Acting Premier when both the Premier and Deputy Premier were overseas in 1982. He held several portfolios in the ministry including:

- Minister for Lands and Forests 1968–1972
- Minister for Primary Industries 1972–1974
- Minister for Primary Industries and Fisheries 1974–1975
- Minister for Primary Industries 1975–1980
- Minister for Mines and Energy 1980
- Minister for Commerce and Industry 1980–1982

Parliament of Queensland
Preceded by Les Diplock	Member for Condamine; 1960–1983	Succeeded by Brian Littleproud
