= Tom Aikens (politician) =

Australian politician

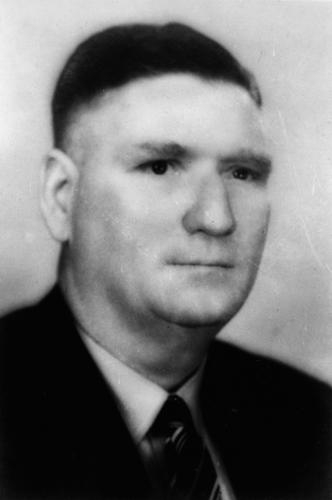

Member of the Queensland Legislative Assembly for Mundingburra
- In office 15 April 1944 – 28 May 1960
- Preceded by: John Dash
- Succeeded by: Seat abolished

Member of the Queensland Legislative Assembly for Townsville South
- In office 28 May 1960 – 12 November 1977
- Preceded by: New seat
- Succeeded by: Alex Wilson

Personal details
- Born: Thomas Aikens; 29 April 1900 Hughenden, Queensland, Australia
- Died: 30 November 1985 (aged 85) Townsville, Queensland, Australia
- Party: North Queensland Labor Party
- Spouse: Margaret Ann Myers
- Occupation: Engine driver

This is about the Queensland politician. For the English chef and his restaurant, see Tom Aikens and Tom Aikens (restaurant).

Thomas Aikens (29 April 1900 – 30 November 1985) was a politician in Queensland, Australia. He was a Member of the Queensland Legislative Assembly.

== Politics ==
Aikens was a member of the Cloncurry Shire Council from 1924 to 1930, being deputy chairman 1927 to 1930. From 1936 to 1949 he was an alderman of the City of Townsville, being deputy mayor from 1939 to 1944.

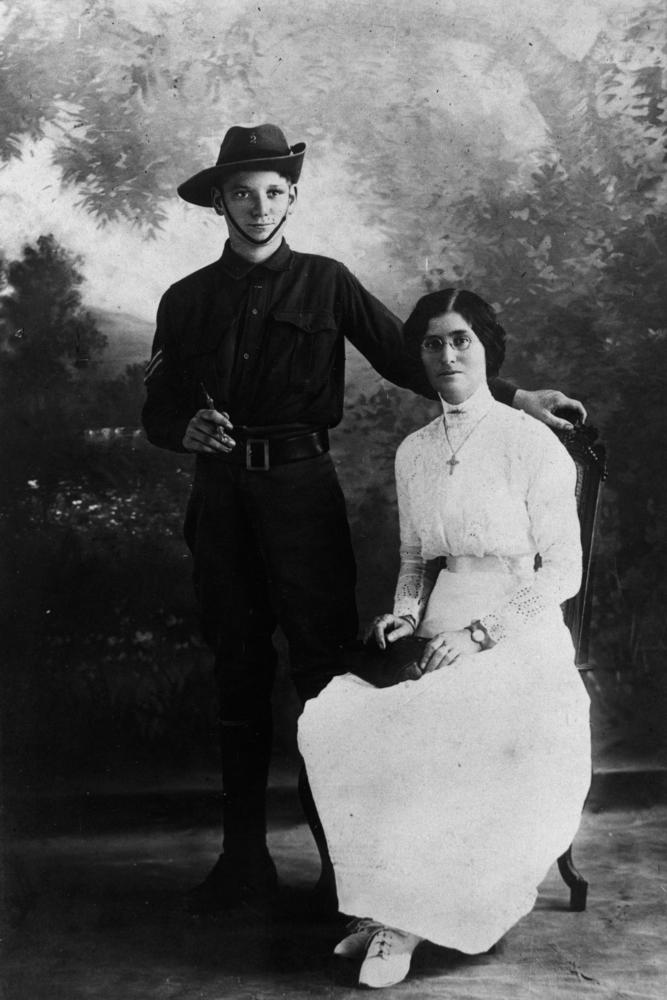
Senior Cadet Tom Aikens, Charters Towers, 1916 Tom Aikens in Senior Cadet uniform

Initially, Aikens was a member of the Labor Party, being secretary of the Cloncurry branch from 1933 to 1940. He was also the founder of their branch at Hermit Park. However, his Soviet sympathies caused him to be expelled from the party in 1940; the Hermit Park branch was also expelled from the Labor party in 1941 for the same reasons. The branch responded by forming its own political party, the North Queensland Labor Party (NQLP).

Aikens contested the 1944 state election in the seat of Mundingburra as an NQLP and was elected on 15 April. Effectively an independent (being the only member of his party in the parliament), he retained the seat in the elections of 1947, 1950, 1953, 1956 and 1957. An electoral redistribution abolished the seat of Mundingburra in 1959 so Aikens successfully contested the seat of Townsville South instead in the 1960 election held on 28 May. He retained that seat through the state elections of 1963, 1966, 1969, 1972 and 1974. On 12 November 1977 he was defeated in the 1977 election by ALP candidate, Alex Wilson.

Parliament of Queensland
Preceded by John Dash	Member for Mundingburra; 1944–1960	Abolished
New seat	Member for Townsville South; 1960–1977	Succeeded by Alex Wilson
