= Electoral district of Somerset =

Coordinates: 26.972°S 152.430°E

Somerset Queensland—Legislative Assembly
- State: Queensland
- Created: 1950
- Abolished: 1992
- Namesake: Lake Somerset

Somerset was an electoral district of the Legislative Assembly in the Australian state of Queensland from 1950 to 1992.

Its area was mostly inherited from the abolished district of Stanley, located in the upper Brisbane River valley. It was named after Lake Somerset.

Somerset was mostly a safe Country/National party seat, although was won by Labor in the 1953 election.

It was abolished in the 1991 redistribution, and its territory was distributed between the districts of Lockyer and Crows Nest.

== Members for Somerset ==
Member	Party	Term
Duncan MacDonald	Country	1950–1953
Alexander Skinner	Labor	1953–1957
Alexander Skinner	Queensland Labor	1957
Harold Richter	Country	1957–1972
Bill Gunn	Country	1972–1974
Bill Gunn	National	1974–1992

== See also ==
- Electoral districts of Queensland
- Members of the Queensland Legislative Assembly by year
- Category:Members of the Queensland Legislative Assembly by name
