= William Ewan =

Australian politician

Member of the Queensland Legislative Assembly for Roma
- In office 29 April 1950 – 7 March 1953
- Preceded by: New seat
- Succeeded by: Alfred Dohring
- In office 3 August 1957 – 14 March 1967
- Preceded by: Alfred Dohring
- Succeeded by: Ken Tomkins

Personal details
- Born: William Manson Ewan; 18 September 1903 Cowra, New South Wales, Australia
- Died: 14 March 1967 (aged 63) Brisbane, Queensland, Australia
- Party: Country Party
- Spouse(s): Jessie Alison Mary De Conlay (m.1927 d.1943), Alice Catherine McLuckie (m.1944)
- Occupation: Farmer

William Manson Ewan (18 September 1903 – 14 March 1967) was a member of the Queensland Legislative Assembly.

== Biography ==
Ewan was born at Cowra, New South Wales, the son of James William Ewan and his wife Mary Manson (née Whelan). He was educated at Sydney and Warwick and was a jackeroo and overseer in 1922. He then managed Boothulla a station near Quilpie for the Queensland MLA, Arnold Wienholt. In 1925 he took up Gunnawarra at Morven and sold it in 1952. He was the chairman of directors with the Roma Transport Co. Ltd, 1954–1958 and a director of Western Publishers Pty Ltd and also the Toowoomba and Maranoa Broadcasting Co.

In 1927 Ewan married Jessie Alison Mary De Conlay and together had one son and two daughters. Jessie died in 1943 and the next year he married Alice Catherine McLuckie. Ewan died in March 1967 at Parliament House, Brisbane and was cremated at the Mt Thompson Crematorium.

== Public life ==
Ewan won the new seat of Roma for the Country Party at the 1950 Queensland state election, defeating the Labor candidate by over 400 votes. He was to hold it for one term, being defeated by Alfred Dohring in 1953.

He was out of politics for four years when the Labor Party split in two with the result being Ewan returned once again as the member for Roma in 1957. This time he held the seat until his death in 1967.

Parliament of Queensland
New seat	Member for Roma; 1950–1953	Succeeded by Alfred Dohring
Preceded by Alfred Dohring	Member for Roma; 1957–1967	Succeeded by Ken Tomkins
