= Duncan MacDonald (politician) =

Australian politician

Member of the Queensland Legislative Assembly for Stanley
- In office 2 April 1938 – 29 April 1950
- Preceded by: Roy Bell
- Succeeded by: Seat abolished

Assembly Member for Somerset
- In office 29 April 1950 – 7 March 1953
- Preceded by: New seat
- Succeeded by: Alexander Skinner

Personal details
- Born: Duncan MacDonald; 30 June 1885 Girvan, Ayrshire, Scotland
- Died: 28 September 1977 (aged 92) Maleny, Queensland, Australia
- Party: Country Party
- Spouse: Mary Irene Enid Ward (m.1913 d.1961)
- Education: University of Edinburgh
- Occupation: Grazier

Duncan MacDonald (30 June 1885 – 28 September 1977) was a member of the Queensland Legislative Assembly.

== Biography ==
MacDonald was born at Girvan, Ayrshire, Scotland, the son of Thomas Duncan MacDonald Snr and his wife Christina (née McLean). He was educated at the Glasgow Academy University of Edinburgh and after arriving in Queensland in 1908 took up a variety of bush related jobs. He became the manager of a sugar plantation and then an inspector with the Bureau of Sugar Experiment stations.

In his youth, Macdonald was a noted boxer and played first-class rugby union. He was a member of the Queensland Club and a councilor and steward on the Royal National Association.

On 4 June 1913 MacDonald married Mary Irene Enid Ward (died 1961) and together had one son and two daughters. The son, Peter Macdonald (9 January 1916 – 11 March 1943) was an RAAF Pilot Officer, lost presumed killed in WWII. His young widow, Orme Augusta Marsh Macdonald, née Bell (18 May 1914 – 11 February 2008), in 1947 married again to widowed solicitor Hubert Silvers Black (17 January 1906 – 22 October 1985), son of mine manager Robert Silvers Black.

He died at Maleny in September 1977.

== Public life ==
MacDonald, representing the Country Party, won the seat of Stanley at the 1938 Queensland state election. He held the seat until 1950 when the seat was abolished, then moved to the new seat of Somerset which he held until 1953.

He was a long-term member of the Shire of Landsborough council, being a councilor from 1927–1936, 1955–1958, and 1961–1964. He was also the chairman of the shire in 1955–1958.

Parliament of Queensland
Preceded by Roy Bell	Member for Stanley; 1938–1950	Abolished
New seat	Member for Somerset; 1950–1953	Succeeded by Alexander Skinner
