= Eric Allpass =

Australian politician

Member of the Queensland Legislative Assembly for Condamine
- In office 29 April 1950 – 7 March 1953
- Preceded by: New seat
- Succeeded by: Les Diplock

Personal details
- Born: Frederic James Allpass; 21 September 1889 Warwick, Queensland, Australia
- Died: 5 April 1977 (aged 87) Toowoomba, Queensland, Australia
- Party: Country Party
- Spouse: Florence Marian Guille (m.1921)
- Occupation: Grazier

Frederic James "Eric" Allpass (21 September 1889 - 5 April 1977) was a member of the Queensland Legislative Assembly.

== Biography ==
Allpass was born in Warwick, Queensland, the son of Frederic William Allpass and his wife Isabel Jane (née Merry). He was educated at Laidley State School and on leaving school became a dairy farmer and grazier.

On 21 November 1921 Allpass married Florence Marian Guille and together had a son and two daughters. He died in April 1977 at Toowoomba.

== Public career ==
At the 1950 Queensland state election, Allpass won the new seat of Condamine for the Country Party, easily defeating his Labor opponent, Michael Lyons. In 1953 however, the new Labor candidate, Les Diplock, turned the tables and defeated Allpass.

Parliament of Queensland
New seat	Member for Condamine; 1950–1953	Succeeded by Les Diplock
