= Alexander Skinner (politician) =

Australian politician

Member of the Queensland Legislative Assembly for Somerset
- In office 7 Mar 1953 – 3 Aug 1957
- Preceded by: Duncan MacDonald
- Succeeded by: Harold Richter

Personal details
- Born: Alexander James Skinner; 2 November 1910 Boonah, Queensland, Australia
- Died: 3 October 1968 (aged 57) Ipswich, Queensland, Queensland, Australia
- Resting place: Ipswich General Cemetery
- Party: Queensland Labor Party
- Other political affiliations: Labor
- Spouse: Camilla Catherine Marjorie Archer (m.1935 d.2003)
- Occupation: Fitter and turner

Alexander James Skinner (2 November 1910 – 3 October 1968) was a member of the Queensland Legislative Assembly.

== Biography ==
Skinner was born at Boonah, Queensland, the son of William Skinner and his wife Fanny Elizabeth (née Thomas). He attended school at Boonah and Ipswich, and became a fitter and turner at the Ipswich Railway Workshops. He was later costs clerk at the Main Roads Department.

On 5 January 1935 Skinner married Camilla Catherine Marjorie Archer (died 2003) and together had three daughters. He died at Ipswich in October 1968 and was buried in the Ipswich General Cemetery.

== Public life ==
Skinner, the Labor Party candidate, won the seat of Somerset at the 1953 Queensland state election. He held the seat until 1957. For the last few months he represented the Queensland Labor Party after premier Vince Gair and most of his cabinet split from the Labor Party.

Parliament of Queensland
Preceded by Duncan MacDonald	Member for Somerset; 1953–1957	Succeeded by Harold Richter
