= Les Diplock =

Australian politician

Les Diplock CMG

Member of the Queensland Legislative Assembly for Condamine
- In office 7 March 1953 – 28 May 1960
- Preceded by: Frederick Allpass
- Succeeded by: Vic Sullivan

Member of the Queensland Legislative Assembly for Aubigny
- In office 28 May 1960 – 27 May 1972
- Preceded by: Walter Sparkes
- Succeeded by: Seat abolished

Personal details
- Born: Leslie Frank Louis Diplock; 16 September 1899 South Brisbane, Queensland, Australia
- Died: 6 November 1983 (aged 84) Sandgate, Queensland, Australia
- Party: Queensland Labor Party; Democratic Labor Party
- Other political affiliations: Labor
- Spouse: Olive Constance Becker
- Occupation: Teacher

Leslie Frank Louis "Les" Diplock CMG (16 September 1899 – 6 November 1983) was an Australian politician.

Diplock was born in South Brisbane to house-painter Louis Diplock and Louisa May, née Lucas and attended state and private schools in Rockhampton. He was a student teacher from 1914 and taught in Rockhampton, Toowoomba and Bribie Island from 1918 to 1924. He married Olive Constance Becker on 20 December 1920 at Taroom. He was head teacher at six successive schools before acting as district inspector of schools for the south-west region from June to December 1952. He was elected to the seat of Condamine in the Legislative Assembly of Queensland in 1953 as a Labor Party candidate.

Diplock was appointed minister for public instruction in 1956, and his ministry was chiefly remembered for a controversial bill providing for a government appointee to head an appointments and promotions repeal board at the University of Queensland; the bill was repealed when the Coalition won government in 1957. During the Labor split of that year, Diplock sided with his leader Vince Gair in splitting away to form the Queensland Labor Party (QLP), and he retained Condamine in that year's election. He transferred to Aubigny in 1960, defeating the sitting Country Party member Walter Sparkes, but by 1963 Diplock was the QLP's sole parliamentary representative. The QLP formally aligned with the national Democratic Labor Party in 1962, although Diplock continued to describe himself as a QLP member until 1969. He continued to represent Aubigny until its abolition in 1972, when he retired following the seat's abolition. He was appointed Companion of the Order of St Michael and St George in 1972.

Diplock, despite being a member of the Catholic-associated DLP, was a devoted Anglican and Freemason. He retired to Scarborough. He died in 1983 at Sandgate and was cremated.

Parliament of Queensland
Preceded by Frederick Allpass	Member for Condamine; 1953–1960	Succeeded by Vic Sullivan
Preceded by Walter Sparkes	Member for Aubigny; 1960–1972	Abolished
