= North Queensland Labor Party =

Defunct political party in Queensland, Australia

- Leader: Tom Aikens
- Founded: 1944
- Dissolved: 1977
- Split from: Australian Labor Party (Queensland Branch)
- Ideology: Populism
- Queensland Legislative Assembly: 1 / 75 (1950–1960)

The North Queensland Labor Party (known as the Hermit Park Labor Party before 1949 and the North Queensland Party after 1974) was a minor political party in Australia from 1942 to 1977.

The party was formed when the Australian Labor Party in Queensland expelled its branch in Hermit Park, Townsville and the latter's founder, Tom Aikens, for Soviet sympathies. The branch often held events that aimed to support the Russian war effort during World War II. The expelled branch established itself as a separate party. The NQLP held a majority within the Townsville council from 1943 to 1949, having formed a coalition with local Communist councillors such as Fred Paterson until 1946.

Aikens was elected for the Electoral district of Mundingburra in the 1944 Queensland state election and would serve in the state parliament for the next 33 years; in 1960 a redistribution turned his seat into the Electoral district of Townsville South. Although initially contesting a few other seats in northern Queensland the party only ever elected Aikens. He was defeated in the 1977 Queensland state election and the party subsequently folded.

Rather than maintaining a set platform, the party was noted for being "merely a medium for Aikens’s political career". Aikens himself was termed the "perfect provincial populist" for his shifting views.
