= Electoral district of Condamine =

State electoral district of Queensland, Australia

Condamine Queensland—Legislative Assembly
- Map of the electoral district of Condamine, 2017
- State: Queensland
- Dates current: 1950–1992; 2009–present
- MP: Pat Weir
- Party: Liberal National
- Namesake: Condamine River
- Electors: 37,883 (2020)
- Area: 6,563 km^{2} (2,534.0 sq mi)
- Demographic: Provincial and rural
- Coordinates: 27°24′S 151°38′E
Electorates around Condamine:
Warrego	Nanango	Nanango
Warrego	Condamine	Toowoomba North; Toowoomba South
Southern Downs	Southern Downs	Lockyer

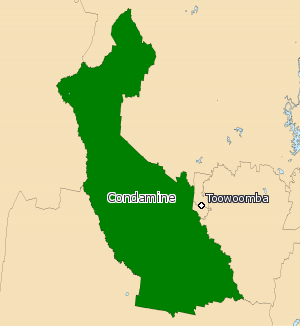
Electoral map of Condamine 2008

Condamine is an electoral district of the Legislative Assembly in the Australian state of Queensland.

Condamine takes in areas to the north-west, west and south of Toowoomba. It includes a number of small towns, such as Oakey, Pittsworth, Cambooya and Clifton. The district is named for the Condamine River which runs through it. Created for the 2009 state election, it was mostly made up of territory previously belonging to the abolished districts of Cunningham and Darling Downs. It also drew a small number of voters previously belonging to the district of Toowoomba South. Originally proposed to be named Dalby by the Electoral Commission of Queensland, the name Condamine was adopted instead upon further review.

There was also an earlier district known as Condamine that existed from 1950 to 1992. It was based in the same region.

== History ==
The electorate's re-introduction at the 2009 state election pitted two sitting members against each other. MPs Ray Hopper and Stuart Copeland both had their districts, Darling Downs and Cunningham respectively, abolished and largely absorbed into Condamine. Both had belonged to the Liberal National Party (LNP). Under the LNP constitution, if a seat is abolished, the sitting member who represents a majority of voters in a successor seat is automatically preselected as LNP candidate. In this case, Hopper automatically gained LNP preselection, as most of Condamine's voters came from Darling Downs. Copeland ran as an independent, only to be defeated by Hopper at the election.

== Members for Condamine ==
First incarnation (1950–1992)
Member	Party	Term
Eric Allpass	Country	1950–1953
Les Diplock	Labor	1953–1957
Les Diplock	Queensland Labor	1957–1960
Vic Sullivan	Country	1960–1974
Vic Sullivan	National	1974–1983
Brian Littleproud	National	1983–1992
Second incarnation (2009–present)
Member	Party	Term
Ray Hopper	Liberal National	2009–2012
Ray Hopper	Katter's Australian	2012–2015
Pat Weir	Liberal National	2015–present

== Election results ==
2024 Queensland state election: Condamine
Party	Candidate	Votes	%	±%
Liberal National	Pat Weir	22,562	60.12	+5.46
Labor	Ben Whibley-Faulkner	6,685	17.81	−5.21
One Nation	Clay Harland	4,122	10.98	−4.67
Family First	Alan Hughes	2,086	5.56	+5.56
Greens	Ellisa Parker	2,074	5.53	+0.62
Total formal votes		37,529	96.62	−0.52
Informal votes		1,312	3.38	+0.52
Turnout		38,841	91.92	+0.13
Two-party-preferred result
Liberal National	Pat Weir	27,620	73.60	+4.40
Labor	Ben Whibley-Faulkner	9,909	26.40	−4.40
Liberal National hold		Swing	+4.40	

Primary vote results in Condamine (second incarnation) (Parties that have never received 5% of the vote are omitted.)
Labor
Liberal National
One Nation
Katter's Australian
Independent
View source data.
Two-candidate-preferred vote results in Condamine (second incarnation) View source data.
