= Alfred Dohring =

Australian politician

- December 1952 portrait

Member of the Queensland Legislative Assembly for Roma
- In office 7 Mar 1953 – 3 Aug 1957
- Preceded by: William Ewan
- Succeeded by: William Ewan

Personal details
- Born: Alfred Dohring; 11 July 1896 Alpha
- Died: 13 July 1982 (aged 86) Brisbane
- Resting place: Mt Gravatt Cemetery
- Party: Labor
- Other political affiliations: Queensland Labor Party

Alfred Dohring (11 July 1896 – 13 July 1982) was an Australian politician. He was a Member of the Queensland Legislative Assembly.

== Early life ==
Alfred Dohring was born on 11 July 1896 in Alpha, Queensland, the son of August Dohring and his wife Jane (née Donnell).

== Politics ==
Dohring was the member for Roma in the Legislative Assembly of Queensland from 1953 to 1957, representing first the Labor Party and then the breakaway Queensland Labor Party in 1957.

== Fall from Story Bridge ==
On 29 July 1954, Dohring fell 100 feet (30 m) from the centre span of the Story Bridge into the Brisbane River below. An officer on the freighter Daylesford heard the splash and dispatched two seamen in a ship's boat who dragged the unconscious Dohring from the water. He suffered extensive injuries and was placed in an iron lung at the Brisbane General Hospital. When he recovered consciousness, he told police he must have blacked out because he had no memory of the fall. Doctors said he was lucky to have survived. By late August, he was well enough to return to his parliamentary duties.

== Later life ==
Dohring died in 1982 and was buried in Mt Gravatt Cemetery.

Parliament of Queensland
| Preceded by William Ewan | Member for Roma; 1953–1957 | Succeeded by William Ewan |
