= Electoral district of Roma =

Coordinates: 26.58°S 148.79°E

Roma Queensland—Legislative Assembly
- State: Queensland
- Created: 1950
- Abolished: 1992
- Namesake: Roma
- Demographic: Rural

Roma was an electoral district of the Legislative Assembly in the Australian state of Queensland from 1950 to 1992.

It was named after the town of Roma, and comprises largely areas from the abolished districts of Dalby and Maranoa.

Roma was mostly a safe seat for the Country/National party, and was the seat of Premier Russell Cooper.

It was abolished in the 1991 redistribution under the Goss government, and its territory distributed between the new district of Western Downs and the existing district of Warrego.

== Members for Roma ==
Member	Party	Term
William Ewan	Country	1950–1953
Alfred Dohring	Labor	1953–1957
Alfred Dohring	Queensland Labor	1957
William Ewan	Country	1957–1967
Ken Tomkins	Country	1967–1974
Ken Tomkins	National	1974–1983
Russell Cooper	National	1983–1992

== See also ==
- Electoral districts of Queensland
- Members of the Queensland Legislative Assembly by year
- Category:Members of the Queensland Legislative Assembly by name
