= Electoral results for the district of Toowoomba North =

Queensland, Australia, district election results

This is a list of electoral results for the electoral district of Toowoomba North in Queensland state elections.

== Members for Toowoomba North ==
Member	Party	Term
Ray Bousen	Labor	1972–1974
John Lockwood	Liberal	1974–1983
Sandy McPhie	National	1983–1989
John Flynn	Labor	1989–1992
Graham Healy	National	1992–2001
Kerry Shine	Labor	2001–2012
Trevor Watts	Liberal National	2012–present

== Election results ==
=== Elections in the 2020s ===
2024 Queensland state election: Toowoomba North
Party	Candidate	Votes	%	±%
Liberal National	Trevor Watts	19,909	57.10	+7.11
Labor	James Green	8,468	24.29	−10.75
Greens	Thom Roker	2,595	7.44	+0.99
One Nation	Sebastian Lund	2,457	7.05	−0.33
Family First	Kerri Hislop	1,436	4.12	+4.12
Total formal votes		34,865	96.92	−0.6
Informal votes		1,109	3.08	+0.6
Turnout		35,974	88.96	+0.63
Two-party-preferred result
Liberal National	Trevor Watts	23,193	66.52	+9.20
Labor	James Green	11,672	33.48	−9.20
Liberal National hold		Swing	+9.20	

2020 Queensland state election: Toowoomba North
Party	Candidate	Votes	%	±%
Liberal National	Trevor Watts	16,115	49.99	+7.80
Labor	Megan O'Hara Sullivan	11,297	35.04	+2.02
One Nation	Ron Humphrey	2,380	7.38	−7.28
Greens	Alyce Nelligan	2,080	6.45	−0.08
United Australia	Stella Sokolova	364	1.13	+1.13
Total formal votes		32,236	97.52	+1.13
Informal votes		819	2.48	−1.13
Turnout		33,055	88.33	+0.14
Two-party-preferred result
Liberal National	Trevor Watts	18,479	57.32	+1.60
Labor	Megan O'Hara Sullivan	13,757	42.68	−1.60
Liberal National hold		Swing	+1.60	

=== Elections in the 2010s ===
2017 Queensland state election: Toowoomba North
Party	Candidate	Votes	%	±%
Liberal National	Trevor Watts	13,128	42.2	−2.2
Labor	Kerry Shine	10,274	33.0	−5.8
One Nation	Paul Wilson	4,561	14.7	+14.7
Greens	Emmeline Chidley	2,033	6.5	+2.0
Independent	Josie Townsend	1,118	3.6	+3.6
Total formal votes		31,114	96.4	−1.7
Informal votes		1,166	3.6	+1.7
Turnout		32,280	88.2	−1.9
Two-party-preferred result
Liberal National	Trevor Watts	17,337	55.7	+4.1
Labor	Kerry Shine	13,777	44.3	−4.1
Liberal National hold		Swing	+4.1	

2015 Queensland state election: Toowoomba North
Party	Candidate	Votes	%	±%
Liberal National	Trevor Watts	13,932	44.41	−5.35
Labor	Kerry Shine	12,166	38.78	+6.49
Palmer United	Mandeep Sandhu	1,578	5.03	+5.03
Greens	Ken Gover	1,430	4.56	−0.32
Katter's Australian	Ken Elliott	1,050	3.35	−8.29
Family First	John Sands	871	2.78	+2.78
Independent	Greg Keane	347	1.11	−0.34
Total formal votes		31,374	98.11	−0.05
Informal votes		606	1.89	+0.05
Turnout		31,980	91.00	−1.36
Two-party-preferred result
Liberal National	Trevor Watts	14,999	51.61	−7.97
Labor	Kerry Shine	14,064	48.39	+7.97
Liberal National hold		Swing	−7.97	

2012 Queensland state election: Toowoomba North
Party	Candidate	Votes	%	±%
Liberal National	Trevor Watts	14,898	49.75	+7.62
Labor	Kerry Shine	9,667	32.28	−15.42
Katter's Australian	Peter Pyke	3,485	11.64	+11.64
Greens	Frida Forsberg	1,461	4.88	−0.31
Independent	Neil Riethmuller	433	1.45	+0.41
Total formal votes		29,944	98.15	−0.02
Informal votes		563	1.85	+0.02
Turnout		30,507	92.36	+0.67
Two-party-preferred result
Liberal National	Trevor Watts	16,126	59.58	+12.80
Labor	Kerry Shine	10,942	40.42	−12.80
Liberal National gain from Labor		Swing	+12.80	

=== Elections in the 2000s ===
2009 Queensland state election: Toowoomba North
Party	Candidate	Votes	%	±%
Labor	Kerry Shine	13,911	47.7	−2.7
Liberal National	Trevor Watts	12,289	42.1	+6.0
Greens	Brett Robinson	1,515	5.2	−0.4
Family First	Archie Franz	654	2.2	−2.2
Independent	Perry Jewell	494	1.7	+1.7
Independent	Neil Riethmuller	303	1.0	+1.0
Total formal votes		29,166	98.1	
Informal votes		544	1.9	
Turnout		29,710	91.7	
Two-party-preferred result
Labor	Kerry Shine	14,651	53.2	−4.4
Liberal National	Trevor Watts	12,876	46.8	+4.4
Labor hold		Swing	−4.4	

2006 Queensland state election: Toowoomba North
Party	Candidate	Votes	%	±%
Labor	Kerry Shine	12,374	53.2	+1.0
National	Lyle Shelton	7,899	34.0	−3.9
Greens	Greg Keane	1,206	5.2	+0.1
Family First	Archie Franz	896	3.9	+3.9
Independent	George Westgarth	890	3.8	+3.8
Total formal votes		23,265	98.5	+0.1
Informal votes		358	1.5	−0.1
Turnout		23,623	92.2	+0.0
Two-party-preferred result
Labor	Kerry Shine	13,262	60.4	+3.1
National	Lyle Shelton	8,690	39.6	−3.1
Labor hold		Swing	+3.1	

2004 Queensland state election: Toowoomba North
Party	Candidate	Votes	%	±%
Labor	Kerry Shine	11,785	52.2	+8.1
National	Ian Douglas	8,567	37.9	−1.8
Greens	Michael Kane	1,162	5.1	+5.1
One Nation	Sean Rycard	1,083	4.8	+4.8
Total formal votes		22,597	98.4	+0.7
Informal votes		358	1.6	−0.7
Turnout		22,955	92.2	−1.0
Two-party-preferred result
Labor	Kerry Shine	12,388	57.3	+5.4
National	Ian Douglas	9,235	42.7	−5.4
Labor hold		Swing	+5.4	

2001 Queensland state election: Toowoomba North
Party	Candidate	Votes	%	±%
Labor	Kerry Shine	9,772	44.1	+11.9
National	Graham Healy	8,795	39.7	−0.8
City Country Alliance	Frank Francis	1,529	6.9	+6.9
Independent	Rob Berry	1,215	5.5	+5.5
Independent	Grahame Mogg	846	3.8	+3.8
Total formal votes		22,157	97.7	
Informal votes		527	2.3	
Turnout		22,684	93.2	
Two-party-preferred result
Labor	Kerry Shine	10,503	51.9	+11.9
National	Graham Healy	9,747	48.1	−11.9
Labor gain from National		Swing	+11.9	

=== Elections in the 1990s ===
1998 Queensland state election: Toowoomba North
Party	Candidate	Votes	%	±%
National	Graham Healy	7,678	39.8	−16.9
Labor	Kerry Shine	6,634	34.4	−4.0
One Nation	Ron Davy	4,654	24.1	+24.1
Reform	Barry Reid	319	1.7	+1.7
Total formal votes		19,285	98.9	+0.6
Informal votes		214	1.1	−0.6
Turnout		19,499	93.7	+1.0
Two-party-preferred result
National	Graham Healy	10,475	58.2	−1.4
Labor	Kerry Shine	7,522	41.8	+1.4
National hold		Swing	−1.4	

1995 Queensland state election: Toowoomba North
Party	Candidate	Votes	%	±%
National	Graham Healy	11,012	56.7	+17.3
Labor	Des McGovern	7,463	38.4	−6.7
Independent	Ray Webber	936	4.8	+4.8
Total formal votes		19,411	98.3	+0.2
Informal votes		340	1.7	−0.2
Turnout		19,751	92.7	
Two-party-preferred result
National	Graham Healy	11,459	59.6	+9.1
Labor	Des McGovern	7,756	40.4	−9.1
National hold		Swing	−9.1	

1992 Queensland state election: Toowoomba North
Party	Candidate	Votes	%	±%
Labor	John Flynn	9,249	45.2	+2.5
National	Graham Healy	8,077	39.5	+12.5
Liberal	Rosalie Lang	1,878	9.2	−14.5
Confederate Action	Allen Parsons	837	4.1	+4.1
Indigenous Peoples	Walter McCarthy	428	2.1	+2.1
Total formal votes		20,469	98.1	
Informal votes		405	1.9	
Turnout		20,874	92.8	
Two-party-preferred result
National	Graham Healy	9,986	50.5	+1.4
Labor	John Flynn	9,787	49.5	−1.4
National gain from Labor		Swing	+1.4	

=== Elections in the 1980s ===
1989 Queensland state election: Toowoomba North
Party	Candidate	Votes	%	±%
Labor	John Flynn	8,649	43.6	+6.0
National	Sandy McPhie	5,251	26.5	−21.0
Liberal	John Gouldson	4,636	23.4	+8.6
Independent	Vincent Burke	1,301	6.6	+6.6
Total formal votes		19,837	97.7	−0.5
Informal votes		470	2.3	+0.5
Turnout		18,571	93.0	+0.2
Two-party-preferred result
Labor	John Flynn	10,101	50.9	+8.5
National	Sandy McPhie	9,736	49.1	−8.5
Labor gain from National		Swing	+8.5	

1986 Queensland state election: Toowoomba North
Party	Candidate	Votes	%	±%
National	Sandy McPhie	8,665	47.5	+11.0
Labor	Sheila Forknall	6,860	37.6	−5.0
Liberal	Janet Rankin	2,705	14.8	−6.1
Total formal votes		18,230	98.2	−0.7
Informal votes		341	1.8	+0.7
Turnout		18,571	93.0	+0.2
Two-party-preferred result
National	Sandy McPhie	10,505	57.6	+3.5
Labor	Sheila Forknall	7,725	42.4	−3.5
National hold		Swing	+3.5	

1983 Queensland state election: Toowoomba North
Party	Candidate	Votes	%	±%
Labor	Peter Wood	7,006	42.6	−1.9
National	Sandy McPhie	6,002	36.5	+36.5
Liberal	John Lockwood	3,444	20.9	−34.6
Total formal votes		16,452	98.9	+0.7
Informal votes		181	1.1	−0.7
Turnout		16,633	93.3	+3.5
Two-party-preferred result
National	Sandy McPhie	8,818	53.6	+53.6
Labor	Peter Wood	7,634	46.4	+1.9
National gain from Liberal		Swing	N/A	

1980 Queensland state election: Toowoomba North
Party	Candidate	Votes	%	±%
Liberal	John Lockwood	8,418	55.5	+8.0
Labor	Lindsay Jones	6,754	44.5	−0.9
Total formal votes		15,172	98.2	−0.6
Informal votes		280	1.8	+0.6
Turnout		15,452	89.8	−2.7
Liberal hold		Swing	+3.9	

=== Elections in the 1970s ===
1977 Queensland state election: Toowoomba North
Party	Candidate	Votes	%	±%
Liberal	John Lockwood	7,092	47.5	−5.8
Labor	Ray Bousen	6,778	45.4	+1.3
Democrats	Clifford Knight	846	5.7	+5.7
Progress	Michael Farrell	220	1.5	+1.5
Total formal votes		14,936	98.8	
Informal votes		174	1.2	
Turnout		15,110	92.5	
Two-party-preferred result
Liberal	John Lockwood	7,714	51.6	−1.7
Labor	Ray Bousen	7,222	48.4	+1.7
Liberal hold		Swing	−1.7	

1974 Queensland state election: Toowoomba North
Party	Candidate	Votes	%	±%
Liberal	John Lockwood	6,848	52.3	+38.8
Labor	Ray Bousen	6,245	47.7	−14.1
Total formal votes		13,093	99.0	−0.2
Informal votes		133	1.0	+0.2
Turnout		13,226	89.7	−3.9
Liberal gain from Labor		Swing	+17.2	

1972 Queensland state election: Toowoomba North
Party	Candidate	Votes	%	±%
Labor	Ray Bousen	7,336	61.8	+13.8
Country	Nellie E. Robinson	2,072	17.4	−9.4
Liberal	A.L.P. Zerbst	1,599	13.5	−2.9
Queensland Labor	John Davis	872	7.3	−1.5
Total formal votes		11,879	99.2	
Informal votes		99	0.8	
Turnout		11,978	93.6	
Two-party-preferred result
Labor	Ray Bousen	7,707	64.9	+7.8
Country	Nellie Robinson	4,172	35.1	−7.8
Labor hold		Swing	+7.8	
