= Electoral results for the district of Mount Gravatt =

Queensland, Australia, district election results

This is a list of electoral results for the electoral district of Mount Gravatt in Queensland state elections.

== Members for Mount Gravatt ==
Member	Party	Term
Felix Dittmer	Labor	1950–1957
Graham Hart	Liberal	1957–1963
Geoff Chinchen	Liberal	1963–1977
Guelfi Scassola	Liberal	1977–1983
Ian Henderson	National	1983–1989
Judy Spence	Labor	1989–2009

== Election results ==
=== Elections in the 2000s ===
2006 Queensland state election: Mount Gravatt
Party	Candidate	Votes	%	±%
Labor	Judy Spence	12,742	54.82	−1.63
Liberal	Nick Monsour	7,517	32.34	−3.34
Greens	Daniel Crute	1,710	7.36	+7.36
Family First	Matthew Darragh	956	4.11	+4.11
Independent	J.F. Barnes	319	1.37	−2.41
Total formal votes		23,244	98.13	+0.23
Informal votes		443	1.87	−0.23
Turnout		23,687	89.64	−1.90
Two-party-preferred result
Labor	Judy Spence	13,852	62.88	+2.56
Liberal	Nick Monsour	8,179	37.12	−2.56
Labor hold		Swing	+2.56	

2004 Queensland state election: Mount Gravatt
Party	Candidate	Votes	%	±%
Labor	Judy Spence	13,317	56.45	+1.85
Liberal	Richard Leworthy	8,418	35.68	+8.73
One Nation	Karen Bracken	963	4.08	−5.23
Independent	J.F. Barnes	892	3.78	+3.78
Total formal votes		23,590	97.90	−0.11
Informal votes		507	2.10	+0.11
Turnout		24,097	91.54	−2.26
Two-party-preferred result
Labor	Judy Spence	13,688	60.32	−3.85
Liberal	Richard Leworthy	9,004	39.68	+3.85
Labor hold		Swing	−3.85	

2001 Queensland state election: Mount Gravatt
Party	Candidate	Votes	%	±%
Labor	Judy Spence	13,187	54.6	+8.1
Liberal	Steven Huang	6,509	27.0	−6.1
One Nation	Edmund McMahon	2,248	9.3	−5.2
Greens	Daniel Lloyd	1,141	4.7	+0.7
Independent	Frank Tanti	831	3.4	+3.4
Independent	Ken Eggmolesse	235	1.0	+1.0
Total formal votes		24,151	98.0	
Informal votes		490	2.0	
Turnout		24,641	93.8	
Two-party-preferred result
Labor	Judy Spence	14,220	64.2	+8.1
Liberal	Steve Huang	7,940	35.8	−8.1
Labor hold		Swing	+8.1	

=== Elections in the 1990s ===
1998 Queensland state election: Mount Gravatt
Party	Candidate	Votes	%	±%
Labor	Judy Spence	9,053	48.0	−4.1
Liberal	Graham Quirk	6,047	32.1	−15.9
One Nation	Richard Duffell	2,519	13.4	+13.4
Greens	Rod Young	720	3.8	+3.8
Democrats	Ian Laing	455	2.4	+2.4
Reform	Arthur Colebrook	76	0.4	+0.4
Total formal votes		18,870	98.6	+0.7
Informal votes		267	1.4	−0.7
Turnout		19,137	93.1	+0.9
Two-party-preferred result
Labor	Judy Spence	10,332	57.2	+5.1
Liberal	Graham Quirk	7,739	42.8	−5.1
Labor hold		Swing	+5.1	

1995 Queensland state election: Mount Gravatt
Party	Candidate	Votes	%	±%
Labor	Judy Spence	9,808	52.1	−4.3
Liberal	Joe Hodgson	9,034	47.9	+9.8
Total formal votes		18,842	97.9	−0.1
Informal votes		406	2.1	+0.1
Turnout		19,248	92.2	−0.3
Labor hold		Swing	−7.1	

1992 Queensland state election: Mount Gravatt
Party	Candidate	Votes	%	±%
Labor	Judy Spence	11,211	56.4	+1.9
Liberal	Allan Pidgeon	7,563	38.1	+9.7
Independent	David McBryde	1,092	5.5	+5.5
Total formal votes		19,866	98.0	
Informal votes		402	2.0	
Turnout		20,268	92.5	
Two-party-preferred result
Labor	Judy Spence	11,582	59.2	+3.4
Liberal	Allan Pidgeon	7,991	40.8	−3.4
Labor hold		Swing	+3.4	

=== Elections in the 1980s ===
1989 Queensland state election: Mount Gravatt
Party	Candidate	Votes	%	±%
Labor	Judy Spence	9,697	50.3	+16.7
Liberal	Guelfi Scassola	5,845	30.3	−1.4
National	Ian Henderson	3,738	19.4	−14.2
Total formal votes		19,280	97.2	−0.6
Informal votes		550	2.8	+0.6
Turnout		19,830	92.7	−0.2
Two-party-preferred result
Labor	Judy Spence	9,968	51.7	+8.4
Liberal	Guelfi Scassola	9,312	48.3	+48.3
Labor gain from National		Swing	+8.4	

1986 Queensland state election: Mount Gravatt
Party	Candidate	Votes	%	±%
Labor	Pauline McLaughlin	6,232	33.6	−2.2
National	Ian Henderson	6,226	33.6	−0.5
Liberal	Guelfi Scassola	5,879	31.7	+1.6
Tory and Whig	Christine Shackleton	187	1.0	+1.0
Total formal votes		18,524	97.9	+0.4
Informal votes		404	2.1	−0.4
Turnout		18,928	92.9	−0.2
Two-party-preferred result
National	Ian Henderson	10,502	56.7	+0.4
Labor	Pauline McLaughlin	8,022	43.3	−0.4
National hold		Swing	+0.4	

1983 Queensland state election: Mount Gravatt
Party	Candidate	Votes	%	±%
Labor	Steve Tharenou	6,201	35.8	+4.8
National	Ian Henderson	5,909	34.1	+8.9
Liberal	Guelfi Scassola	5,209	30.1	−13.7
Total formal votes		17,319	98.6	−0.2
Informal votes		242	1.4	+0.2
Turnout		17,561	93.1	+3.5
Two-party-preferred result
National	Ian Henderson	10,037	57.9	+57.9
Labor	Steve Tharenou	7,282	42.1	+7.8
National gain from Liberal		Swing	N/A	

1980 Queensland state election: Mount Gravatt
Party	Candidate	Votes	%	±%
Liberal	Guelfi Scassola	7,006	43.8	+8.2
Labor	Marion McInnes	4,953	31.0	−5.9
National	Ian Henderson	4,031	25.2	+2.0
Total formal votes		15,990	98.8	+0.5
Informal votes		196	1.2	−0.5
Turnout		16,186	89.6	−2.4
Two-party-preferred result
Liberal	Guelfi Scassola	10,500	65.7	+5.3
Labor	Marion McInnes	5,490	34.3	−5.3
Liberal hold		Swing	+5.3	

=== Elections in the 1970s ===
1977 Queensland state election: Mount Gravatt
Party	Candidate	Votes	%	±%
Labor	George Harvey	5,546	36.9	+6.4
Liberal	Guelfi Scassola	5,345	35.6	−31.6
National	Ian Henderson	3,486	23.2	+23.2
Progress	Desmond McKay	654	4.4	+4.4
Total formal votes		15,031	98.3	
Informal votes		261	1.7	
Turnout		15,292	92.0	
Two-party-preferred result
Liberal	Guelfi Scassola	9,085	60.4	−10.2
Labor	George Harvey	5,946	39.6	+10.2
Liberal hold		Swing	−10.2	

1974 Queensland state election: Mount Gravatt
Party	Candidate	Votes	%	±%
Liberal	Geoff Chinchen	10,200	66.9	+20.6
Labor	Bill Avery	4,656	30.5	−16.1
Queensland Labor	Therese Sheil	396	2.6	−4.5
Total formal votes		15,252	98.9	+0.1
Informal votes		164	1.1	−0.1
Turnout		15,416	91.2	−4.3
Two-party-preferred result
Liberal	Geoff Chinchen	10,529	69.0	+16.5
Labor	Bill Avery	4,723	31.0	−16.5
Liberal hold		Swing	+16.5	

1972 Queensland state election: Mount Gravatt
Party	Candidate	Votes	%	±%
Labor	Bill Avery	5,922	46.6	+5.7
Liberal	Geoff Chinchen	5,885	46.3	−6.0
Queensland Labor	Michael Scragg	901	7.1	+0.3
Total formal votes		12,708	98.8	
Informal votes		153	1.2	
Turnout		12,861	95.5	
Two-party-preferred result
Liberal	Geoff Chinchen	6,671	52.5	−4.1
Labor	Bill Avery	6,037	47.5	+4.1
Liberal hold		Swing	−4.1	

=== Elections in the 1960s ===
1969 Queensland state election: Mount Gravatt
Party	Candidate	Votes	%	±%
Liberal	Geoff Chinchen	9,577	52.3	−3.6
Labor	James Kennedy	7,488	40.9	+5.6
Queensland Labor	Patrick O'Reilly	1,250	6.8	−1.9
Total formal votes		18,315	98.5	0.0
Informal votes		272	1.5	0.0
Turnout		18,587	93.9	−0.5
Two-party-preferred result
Liberal	Geoff Chinchen	10,595	57.8	−5.5
Labor	James Kennedy	7,720	42.2	+5.5
Liberal hold		Swing	−5.5	

1966 Queensland state election: Mount Gravatt
Party	Candidate	Votes	%	±%
Liberal	Geoff Chinchen	8,647	55.9	−0.1
Labor	Peter Rowe	5,464	35.3	−0.5
Queensland Labor	Kenneth Bayliss	1,349	8.7	+0.5
Total formal votes		15,460	98.5	+0.5
Informal votes		240	1.5	−0.5
Turnout		15,700	94.4	−0.9
Two-party-preferred result
Liberal	Geoff Chinchen	9,783	63.3	+1.3
Labor	Peter Rowe	5,677	36.7	−1.3
Liberal hold		Swing	+1.3	

1963 Queensland state election: Mount Gravatt
Party	Candidate	Votes	%	±%
Liberal	Geoff Chinchen	7,538	56.0	−0.8
Labor	Stuart Barnes	4,819	35.8	+5.9
Queensland Labor	Eric Allingham	1,108	8.2	−5.1
Total formal votes		13,465	98.5	+0.2
Informal votes		208	1.5	−0.2
Turnout		13,673	95.3	+1.8
Two-party-preferred result
Liberal	Geoff Chinchen	8,342	62.0	
Labor	Stuart Barnes	5,123	38.0	
Liberal hold		Swing	N/A	

1960 Queensland state election: Mount Gravatt
Party	Candidate	Votes	%	±%
Liberal	Graham Hart	6,278	53.9	
Labor	Fred Pearson	3,433	29.5	
Queensland Labor	Rupert Kneen	1,117	9.6	
Independent Labor	Eric King	807	6.9	
Total formal votes		11,635	98.9	
Informal votes		125	1.1	
Turnout		11,760	93.5	
Liberal hold		Swing		

=== Elections in the 1950s ===
1957 Queensland state election: Mount Gravatt
Party	Candidate	Votes	%	±%
Liberal	Graham Hart	10,562	39.7	−0.7
Labor	Felix Dittmer	10,434	39.3	−20.3
Queensland Labor	Charles Edwards	5,432	20.4	+20.4
Independent	Harold Boone	145	0.5	+0.5
Total formal votes		26,573	98.6	−0.2
Informal votes		370	1.4	+0.2
Turnout		26,943	95.2	+1.0
Liberal gain from Labor		Swing	+9.9	

1956 Queensland state election: Mount Gravatt
Party	Candidate	Votes	%	±%
Labor	Felix Dittmer	14,600	59.6	−3.9
Liberal	Eric Handy	9,904	40.4	+5.9
Total formal votes		24,504	98.8	+0.1
Informal votes		286	1.2	−0.1
Turnout		24,790	94.2	+0.6
Labor hold		Swing	−4.9	

1953 Queensland state election: Mount Gravatt
Party	Candidate	Votes	%	±%
Labor	Felix Dittmer	12,203	63.5	+11.2
Liberal	Daniel Rowley	6,635	34.5	−11.5
Communist	George Bordujenko	386	2.0	+2.0
Total formal votes		19,224	98.7	+0.1
Informal votes		259	1.3	−0.1
Turnout		19,483	93.6	+1.5
Labor hold		Swing	+11.6	

1950 Queensland state election: Mount Gravatt
Party	Candidate	Votes	%	±%
Labor	Felix Dittmer	6,702	52.3	
Liberal	Edward Knoblanch	5,890	46.0	
Independent	Donald Orr	215	1.7	
Total formal votes		12,807	98.6	
Informal votes		186	1.4	
Turnout		12,993	92.1	
Labor hold		Swing		
