= Results of the 1960 Queensland state election =

Queensland state election, 28 May 1960 Legislative Assembly << 1957–1963 >>
Enrolled voters	813,584^{[1]}				
Votes cast	752,927		Turnout	92.54	–2.04
Informal votes	9,897		Informal	1.31	+0.17
Summary of votes by party
Party	Primary votes	%	Swing	Seats	Change
Labor	296,430	39.89	+11.00	25	+5
Liberal	178,567	24.03	+0.80	20	+2
Country	139,720	19.50	–0.49	26	+2
Queensland Labor	91,212	12.28	–11.12	4	–7
North Queensland Labor	7,488	1.07	–0.25	1	±0
Ind. Labor	2,257	0.32	+0.26	0	±0
Ind. Conservative	2,723	0.39	+0.39	0	±0
Independent	30,897	4.16		2	+1
Total	743,030			78	

This is a list of electoral district results for the 1960 Queensland state election.

== Results by electoral district ==
=== Albert ===
1960 Queensland state election: Albert
Party	Candidate	Votes	%	±%
Country	Cec Carey	3,277	39.6	
Independent	Ernest Harley	3,017	36.4	
Labor	Cecil Jesson	1,853	22.4	
Independent Country	Grace Plunkett	132	1.6	
Total formal votes		8,279	98.9	
Informal votes		88	1.1	
Turnout		8,367	92.9	
Country win		(new seat)		

=== Ashgrove ===
1960 Queensland state election: Ashgrove
Party	Candidate	Votes	%	±%
Liberal	Douglas Tooth	5,228	50.3	+0.5
Labor	Bert Turner	3,662	35.3	+6.6
Queensland Labor	Thomas Heike	1,492	14.4	−7.0
Total formal votes		10,382	98.8	
Informal votes		123	1.2	
Turnout		10,505	94.3	
Liberal hold		Swing	−4.6	

=== Aspley ===
1960 Queensland state election: Aspley
Party	Candidate	Votes	%	±%
Liberal	Fred Campbell	4,967	47.1	+4.3
Labor	Nellie Carver	4,239	40.2	+4.6
Queensland Labor	George Kerr	1,336	12.7	−8.9
Total formal votes		10,542	98.7	
Informal votes		133	1.3	
Turnout		10,675	94.0	
Liberal hold		Swing	−1.4	

=== Aubigny ===
1960 Queensland state election: Aubigny
Party	Candidate	Votes	%	±%
Queensland Labor	Les Diplock	4,024	45.9	+45.9
Country	Jim Sparkes	3,763	42.9	−57.1
Labor	Bruce Strachan	981	11.2	+11.2
Total formal votes		8,768	99.4	
Informal votes		52	0.6	
Turnout		8,820	93.6	
Queensland Labor gain from Country		Swing	N/A	

- Aubigny was uncontested at the previous election.

=== Balonne ===
1960 Queensland state election: Balonne
Party	Candidate	Votes	%	±%
Country	Eddie Beardmore	4,049	63.1	
Labor	William Dendle	2,371	36.9	
Total formal votes		6,420	98.8	
Informal votes		75	1.2	
Turnout		6,495	87.9	
Country hold		Swing		

=== Barambah ===
1960 Queensland state election: Barambah
Party	Candidate	Votes	%	±%
Country	Joh Bjelke-Petersen	5,957	64.5	
Labor	Bill Weir	1,968	21.3	
Queensland Labor	Daniel Curtain	1,310	14.2	
Total formal votes		9,235	99.1	
Informal votes		88	0.9	
Turnout		9,323	95.0	
Country hold		Swing		

=== Barcoo ===
1960 Queensland state election: Barcoo
Party	Candidate	Votes	%	±%
Labor	Ned Davis	3,676	46.8	
Country	Fred Gowland	2,835	36.1	
Queensland Labor	Tom Foley	1,337	17.0	
Total formal votes		7,848	99.3	
Informal votes		52	0.7	
Turnout		7,900	91.8	
Labor hold		Swing		

==== By-election ====
- This by-election was caused by the death of Ned Davis. It was held on 1 July 1961.

1961 Barcoo state by-election
Party	Candidate	Votes	%	±%
Labor	Eugene O'Donnell	4,355	60.7	+13.9
Queensland Labor	Gordon Vandersee	2,819	39.3	+22.3
Total formal votes		7,174	99.6	+0.3
Informal votes		26	0.4	−0.3
Turnout		7,200	84.4	−7.4
Labor hold		Swing	N/A	

=== Baroona ===
1960 Queensland state election: Baroona
Party	Candidate	Votes	%	±%
Labor	Pat Hanlon	7,094	58.8	+21.0
Liberal	Roger Moore	3,450	28.6	−6.2
Queensland Labor	Geoffrey Maule	1,521	12.6	−14.8
Total formal votes		12,065	98.5	
Informal votes		182	1.5	
Turnout		12,247	91.6	
Labor gain from Queensland Labor		Swing	N/A	

=== Belmont ===
1960 Queensland state election: Belmont
Party	Candidate	Votes	%	±%
Labor	Fred Newton	6,120	54.7	+9.1
Liberal	Bill Hewitt	3,869	34.5	−1.6
Queensland Labor	Jean Reville	1,209	10.8	−5.0
Total formal votes		11,198	98.4	
Informal votes		180	1.6	
Turnout		11,378	92.8	
Labor hold		Swing	+5.5	

=== Bowen ===
1960 Queensland state election: Bowen
Party	Candidate	Votes	%	±%
Liberal	Peter Delamothe	3,287	46.0	
Labor	William Klaka	2,813	39.4	
Queensland Labor	James Berryman	679	9.5	
Communist	James Nisbet	358	5.0	
Total formal votes		7,137	98.4	
Informal votes		115	1.6	
Turnout		7,252	94.1	
Liberal win		(new seat)		

=== Brisbane ===
1960 Queensland state election: Brisbane
Party	Candidate	Votes	%	±%
Labor	Johnno Mann	5,511	51.6	+13.5
Liberal	Jim Rowan	3,180	29.8	−1.4
Queensland Labor	Lionel Orreal	1,979	18.5	−12.2
Total formal votes		10,670	98.1	
Informal votes		201	1.9	
Turnout		10,871	85.9	
Labor hold		Swing	+8.4	

=== Bulimba ===
1960 Queensland state election: Bulimba
Party	Candidate	Votes	%	±%
Labor	Jack Houston	6,184	56.7	+18.4
Liberal	Ronald Kelk	2,985	27.4	−5.9
Queensland Labor	Bob Gardner	1,734	15.9	−12.4
Total formal votes		10,903	98.5	
Informal votes		163	1.5	
Turnout		11,066	94.4	
Labor hold		Swing	+13.9	

=== Bundaberg ===
1960 Queensland state election: Bundaberg
Party	Candidate	Votes	%	±%
Queensland Labor	Ted Walsh	5,138	40.5	
Labor	John Salter	5,122	40.4	
Liberal	Robert Howard	2,415	19.1	
Total formal votes		12,675	98.1	
Informal votes		245	1.9	
Turnout		12,920	94.9	
Queensland Labor hold		Swing		

=== Burdekin ===
1960 Queensland state election: Burdekin
Party	Candidate	Votes	%	±%
Independent	Arthur Coburn	3,529	50.7	
Queensland Labor	Colin McCathie	2,063	29.6	
Labor	Fred Page	1,367	19.6	
Total formal votes		6,959	99.2	
Informal votes		53	0.8	
Turnout		7,012	93.1	
Independent hold		Swing		

=== Burke ===
1960 Queensland state election: Burke
Party	Candidate	Votes	%	±%
Labor	Alec Inch	2,908	42.3	
Queensland Labor	Norm Smith	2,294	33.3	
Country	Alexander Hindson	1,681	24.4	
Total formal votes		6,883	98.7	
Informal votes		88	1.3	
Turnout		6,971	81.4	
Labor win		(new seat)		

=== Burnett ===
1960 Queensland state election: Burnett
Party	Candidate	Votes	%	±%
Country	Claude Wharton	4,969	54.9	
Labor	Denis Grace	2,459	27.2	
Queensland Labor	Edward McDonnell	1,616	17.9	
Total formal votes		9,044	99.2	
Informal votes		75	0.8	
Country hold		Swing		

=== Cairns ===
1960 Queensland state election: Cairns
Party	Candidate	Votes	%	±%
Labor	Watty Wallace	7,057	56.5	
Country	Albert Baggott	3,736	29.9	
Queensland Labor	William Allendorf	1,704	13.6	
Total formal votes		12,497	99.0	
Informal votes		131	1.0	
Turnout		12,628	90.8	
Labor hold		Swing		

=== Callide ===
1960 Queensland state election: Callide
Party	Candidate	Votes	%	±%
Country	Vince Jones	4,998	62.3	
Labor	Oliver Edwards	3,022	37.7	
Total formal votes		8,020	98.6	
Informal votes		114	1.4	
Turnout		8,134	92.9	
Country hold		Swing		

=== Carnarvon ===
1960 Queensland state election: Carnarvon
Party	Candidate	Votes	%	±%
Queensland Labor	Paul Hilton	3,611	41.3	
Country	Fred Rogers	3,155	36.1	
Labor	Douglas Gow	1,983	22.7	
Total formal votes		8,749	98.8	
Informal votes		102	1.2	
Turnout		8,851	91.7	
Queensland Labor hold		Swing		

=== Chatsworth ===
1960 Queensland state election: Chatsworth
Party	Candidate	Votes	%	±%
Liberal	Thomas Hiley	5,511	53.1	
Labor	Joseph Ferguson	3,490	33.7	
Queensland Labor	Terry Burns	1,366	13.2	
Total formal votes		10,367	98.8	
Informal votes		132	1.2	
Turnout		10,499	94.5	
Liberal win		(new seat)		

=== Clayfield ===
1960 Queensland state election: Clayfield
Party	Candidate	Votes	%	±%
Liberal	Harold Taylor	5,905	54.3	
Labor	Edgar Abel	3,015	27.7	
Queensland Labor	Harry Wright	1,953	18.0	
Total formal votes		10,873	98.4	
Informal votes		172	1.6	
Turnout		11,045	91.9	
Liberal hold		Swing		

=== Condamine ===
1960 Queensland state election: Condamine
Party	Candidate	Votes	%	±%
Country	Vic Sullivan	4,723	68.8	
Labor	Leslie Beaumont	1,868	27.2	
Independent	James Drabsch	272	4.0	
Total formal votes		6,863	99.1	
Informal votes		59	0.9	
Turnout		6,922	92.7	
Country gain from Queensland Labor		Swing		

=== Cook ===
1960 Queensland state election: Cook
Party	Candidate	Votes	%	±%
Queensland Labor	Bunny Adair	3,063	39.2	
Labor	John Bethel	2,753	35.2	
Country	William Simms	2,003	25.6	
Total formal votes		7,819	98.9	
Informal votes		88	1.1	
Turnout		7,907	89.9	
Queensland Labor hold		Swing		

=== Cooroora ===
1960 Queensland state election: Cooroora
Party	Candidate	Votes	%	±%
Country	David Low	6,281	71.0	
Labor	Lancelot Sanderson	2,560	29.0	
Total formal votes		8,841	98.6	
Informal votes		124	1.4	
Turnout		8,965	94.2	
Country hold		Swing		

=== Cunningham ===
1960 Queensland state election: Cunningham
Party	Candidate	Votes	%	±%
Country	Alan Fletcher	unopposed		
Country hold		Swing	N/A	

=== Fassifern ===
1960 Queensland state election: Fassifern
Party	Candidate	Votes	%	±%
Country	Alf Muller	6,507	71.8	
Labor	Denis O'Brien	2,551	28.2	
Total formal votes		9,058	98.9	
Informal votes		104	1.1	
Turnout		9,162	94.8	
Country hold		Swing		

=== Flinders ===
1960 Queensland state election: Flinders
Party	Candidate	Votes	%	±%
Country	Bill Longeran	3,831	47.9	
Labor	Frank Forde	3,721	46.6	
Queensland Labor	Patrick McLaughlin	437	5.5	
Total formal votes		7,989	99.1	
Informal votes		75	0.9	
Turnout		8,064	90.2	
Country hold		Swing		

=== Greenslopes ===
1960 Queensland state election: Greenslopes
Party	Candidate	Votes	%	±%
Liberal	Keith Hooper	6,230	55.4	
Labor	John Hughes	3,225	28.7	
Queensland Labor	Michael Lyons	1,665	14.8	
Social Credit	Eric Allen	119	1.1	
Total formal votes		11,239	98.7	
Informal votes		147	1.3	
Turnout		11,386	93.3	
Liberal win		(new seat)		

=== Gregory ===
1960 Queensland state election: Gregory
Party	Candidate	Votes	%	±%
Country	Wally Rae	3,695	54.4	
Labor	Martin Laracy	3,098	45.6	
Total formal votes		6,793	98.5	
Informal votes		104	1.5	
Turnout		6,897	84.9	
Country hold		Swing		

=== Gympie ===
1960 Queensland state election: Gympie
Party	Candidate	Votes	%	±%
Country	Max Hodges	5,616	58.1	
Labor	Blair Jamieson	2,920	30.2	
Queensland Labor	Denis Tanner	1,129	11.7	
Total formal votes		9,665	99.2	
Informal votes		75	0.8	
Turnout		9,740	95.6	
Country win		(new seat)		

=== Hawthorne ===
1960 Queensland state election: Hawthorne
Party	Candidate	Votes	%	±%
Labor	Bill Baxter	5,428	51.4	
Liberal	Clive Harburg	3,882	36.8	
Queensland Labor	Greg Kehoe	1,245	11.8	
Total formal votes		10,555	98.8	
Informal votes		123	1.2	
Turnout		10,678	93.9	
Labor win		(new seat)		

=== Hinchinbrook ===
1960 Queensland state election: Hinchinbrook
Party	Candidate	Votes	%	±%
Country	John Row	3,082	44.1	
Labor	Kevin Cavanagh	2,776	39.7	
Queensland Labor	Victor Bodero	697	10.0	
Independent	William Wilson	438	6.3	
Total formal votes		6,993	98.4	
Informal votes		112	1.6	
Turnout		7,105	93.8	
Country gain from Labor		Swing		

=== Ipswich East ===
1960 Queensland state election: Ipswich East
Party	Candidate	Votes	%	±%
Labor	Jim Donald	8,596	69.2	
Liberal	Hedley Scriven	3,068	24.7	
Queensland Labor	Charles Archer	761	6.1	
Total formal votes		12,425	99.2	
Informal votes		101	0.8	
Turnout		12,526	95.8	
Labor win		(new seat)		

=== Ipswich West ===
1960 Queensland state election: Ipswich West
Party	Candidate	Votes	%	±%
Labor	Ivor Marsden	7,674	61.8	
Liberal	Harry Groth	3,635	29.3	
Queensland Labor	Selby Guymer	970	7.8	
Communist	Thomas Millar	132	1.1	
Total formal votes		12,411	99.3	
Informal votes		87	0.7	
Turnout		12,498	92.9	
Labor win		(new seat)		

=== Isis ===
1960 Queensland state election: Isis
Party	Candidate	Votes	%	±%
Country	Jack Pizzey	unopposed		
Country hold		Swing	N/A	

=== Ithaca ===
1960 Queensland state election: Ithaca
Party	Candidate	Votes	%	±%
Liberal	Bob Windsor	5,178	46.8	
Labor	Manfred Cross	4,705	42.5	
Queensland Labor	John O'Connell	1,180	10.7	
Total formal votes		11,063	99.1	
Informal votes		104	0.9	
Turnout		11,167	92.3	
Liberal gain from Labor		Swing		

=== Kedron ===
1960 Queensland state election: Kedron
Party	Candidate	Votes	%	±%
Labor	Eric Lloyd	7,059	60.8	
Liberal	Ronald Burrows	3,412	29.4	
Independent	Harold Whitlock	1,133	9.8	
Total formal votes		11,604	98.4	
Informal votes		191	1.6	
Turnout		11,795	95.3	
Labor hold		Swing		

=== Kurilpa ===
1960 Queensland state election: Kurilpa
Party	Candidate	Votes	%	±%
Liberal	Clive Hughes	5,068	49.3	
Labor	Arthur Larkin	4,087	39.8	
Queensland Labor	Paul Tucker	1,115	10.9	
Total formal votes		10,270	98.2	
Informal votes		193	1.8	
Turnout		10,463	90.9	
Liberal hold		Swing		

=== Landsborough ===
1960 Queensland state election: Landsborough
Party	Candidate	Votes	%	±%
Country	Frank Nicklin	7,051	79.8	
Labor	Frank McLoughlin	1,768	20.2	
Total formal votes		8,837	98.5	
Informal votes		137	1.5	
Turnout		8,974	91.6	
Country hold		Swing		

=== Lockyer ===
1960 Queensland state election: Lockyer
Party	Candidate	Votes	%	±%
Liberal	Gordon Chalk	5,077	63.4	
Independent Country	John Martin	2,319	28.9	
Independent Labor	Edwin Olm	447	5.6	
Independent	James Dwyer	169	2.1	
Total formal votes		8,012	99.0	
Informal votes		82	1.0	
Turnout		8,094	95.7	
Liberal hold		Swing		

=== Logan ===
1960 Queensland state election: Logan
Party	Candidate	Votes	%	±%
Country	Leslie Harrison	5,404	61.3	
Labor	Vincent Sheppard	3,413	38.7	
Total formal votes		8,817	98.0	
Informal votes		183	2.0	
Turnout		9,000	92.1	
Country win		(new seat)		

=== Mackay ===
1960 Queensland state election: Mackay
Party	Candidate	Votes	%	±%
Labor	Fred Graham	4,561	50.2	
Country	John Matson	3,526	38.8	
Queensland Labor	Terence Hayes	1,004	11.0	
Total formal votes		9,091	99.0	
Informal votes		95	1.0	
Turnout		9,186	93.0	
Labor hold		Swing		

=== Mackenzie ===
1960 Queensland state election: Mackenzie
Party	Candidate	Votes	%	±%
Country	Nev Hewitt	4,329	64.8	
Labor	Charles White	2,348	35.2	
Total formal votes		6,677	98.8	
Informal votes		83	1.2	
Turnout		6,760	92.9	
Country hold		Swing		

=== Maryborough ===
1960 Queensland state election: Maryborough
Party	Candidate	Votes	%	±%
Labor	Horace Davies	7,197	66.3	
Country	Ronald Christensen	3,665	33.7	
Total formal votes		10,862	99.3	
Informal votes		80	0.7	
Turnout		10,942	96.5	
Labor hold		Swing		

=== Merthyr ===
1960 Queensland state election: Merthyr
Party	Candidate	Votes	%	±%
Liberal	Sam Ramsden	5,376	50.1	
Labor	Tom Campbell	3,562	33.2	
Queensland Labor	Mick O'Connor	1,794	16.7	
Total formal votes		10,732	98.1	
Informal votes		205	1.9	
Turnout		10,937	88.6	
Liberal hold		Swing		

=== Mirani ===
1960 Queensland state election: Mirani
Party	Candidate	Votes	%	±%
Country	Ernie Evans	4,670	62.9	
Labor	George Moody	2,053	27.7	
Queensland Labor	Waller O'Grady	697	9.4	
Total formal votes		7,420	98.8	
Informal votes		86	1.2	
Turnout		7,506	92.6	
Turnout		7,506	92.6	
Country hold		Swing		

=== Mount Coot-tha ===
1960 Queensland state election: Mount Coot-tha
Party	Candidate	Votes	%	±%
Liberal	Kenneth Morris	5,803	56.8	
Labor	James Davis	3,057	29.9	
Queensland Labor	Bryan Hurley	1,362	13.3	
Total formal votes		10,222	98.3	
Informal votes		181	1.7	
Turnout		10,403	93.0	
Liberal hold		Swing		

=== Mount Gravatt ===
1960 Queensland state election: Mount Gravatt
Party	Candidate	Votes	%	±%
Liberal	Graham Hart	6,278	53.9	
Labor	Fred Pearson	3,433	29.5	
Queensland Labor	Rupert Kneen	1,117	9.6	
Independent Labor	Eric King	807	6.9	
Total formal votes		11,635	98.9	
Informal votes		125	1.1	
Turnout		11,760	93.5	
Liberal hold		Swing		

=== Mourilyan ===
1960 Queensland state election: Mourilyan
Party	Candidate	Votes	%	±%
Labor	Peter Byrne	4,417	54.6	
Country	Edmund Webb	2,905	35.9	
Queensland Labor	Geoff Higham	770	9.5	
Total formal votes		8,092	98.6	
Informal votes		115	1.4	
Turnout		8,207	91.5	
Labor hold		Swing		

=== Mulgrave ===
1960 Queensland state election: Mulgrave
Party	Candidate	Votes	%	±%
Country	Roy Armstrong	3,113	49.1	
Labor	Stanley Scoines	1,723	27.2	
Independent	James Hesp	787	12.4	
Queensland Labor	Charles English	714	11.3	
Total formal votes		6,337	98.9	
Informal votes		68	1.1	
Turnout		6,405	88.8	
Country hold		Swing		

=== Murrumba ===
1960 Queensland state election: Murrumba
Party	Candidate	Votes	%	±%
Country	David Nicholson	5,334	60.5	
Labor	Norm Kruger	3,481	39.5	
Total formal votes		8,815	98.3	
Informal votes		151	1.7	
Turnout		8,966	93.1	
Country hold		Swing		

=== Norman ===
1960 Queensland state election: Norman
Party	Candidate	Votes	%	±%
Labor	Fred Bromley	4,896	48.1	
Liberal	Cyril Ryan	3,679	36.1	
Queensland Labor	George Hartnett	1,489	14.6	
Communist	Edmund Crisp	115	1.1	
Total formal votes		10,179	98.8	
Informal votes		121	1.2	
Turnout		10,300	92.1	
Labor hold		Swing		

=== Nudgee ===
1960 Queensland state election: Nudgee
Party	Candidate	Votes	%	±%
Labor	Jack Melloy	6,325	53.7	
Liberal	William Banks	3,926	33.3	
Queensland Labor	Walter Barnes	1,423	12.1	
Communist	William Hill	105	0.9	
Total formal votes		11,779	98.7	
Informal votes		151	1.3	
Turnout		11,930	93.9	
Labor win		(new seat)		

=== Nundah ===
1960 Queensland state election: Nundah
Party	Candidate	Votes	%	±%
Liberal	William Knox	6,148	52.0	
Labor	Michael Sweeney	3,808	32.2	
Queensland Labor	Jim Hadley	1,873	15.8	
Total formal votes		11,829	98.5	
Informal votes		178	1.5	
Turnout		12,007	93.0	
Liberal hold		Swing		

=== Port Curtis ===
1960 Queensland state election: Port Curtis
Party	Candidate	Votes	%	±%
Labor	Jim Burrows	6,033	68.6	
Independent	Desmond Neill-Ballantine	2,773	31.4	
Total formal votes		8,806	98.8	
Informal votes		108	1.2	
Turnout		8,914	95.1	
Labor hold		Swing		

=== Redcliffe ===
1960 Queensland state election: Redcliffe
Party	Candidate	Votes	%	±%
Independent	Jim Houghton	4,047	42.0	
Country	Seymour Gomersall	2,394	24.8	
Labor	Kenneth Griffith	2,178	22.6	
Queensland Labor	Edward Dignan	556	5.8	
Independent	Alexander Black	470	4.9	
Total formal votes		9,645	98.9	
Informal votes		109	1.1	
Turnout		9,754	92.3	
Independent win		(new seat)		

=== Rockhampton North ===
1960 Queensland state election: Rockhampton North
Party	Candidate	Votes	%	±%
Labor	Merv Thackeray	7,312	60.0	
Liberal	Hector MacDonald	3,205	26.3	
Queensland Labor	James Verney	1,667	13.7	
Total formal votes		12,184	99.1	
Informal votes		109	0.9	
Turnout		12,293	95.4	
Labor win		(new seat)		

=== Rockhampton South ===
1960 Queensland state election: Rockhampton South
Party	Candidate	Votes	%	±%
Liberal	Rex Pilbeam	5,047	41.1	
Queensland Labor	Mick Gardner	3,801	31.0	
Labor	Jim Clark	3,427	27.9	
Total formal votes		12,275	99.1	
Informal votes		106	0.9	
Turnout		12,381	93.7	
Liberal win		(new seat)		

=== Roma ===
1960 Queensland state election: Roma
Party	Candidate	Votes	%	±%
Country	William Ewan	3,629	44.5	
Labor	John Taylor	2,558	31.3	
Independent	Richard Condon	1,976	24.2	
Total formal votes		8,163	99.3	
Informal votes		61	0.7	
Turnout		8,224	92.8	
Country hold		Swing		

=== Salisbury ===
1960 Queensland state election: Salisbury
Party	Candidate	Votes	%	±%
Labor	Doug Sherrington	6,243	55.7	
Liberal	Norman Edwards	3,530	31.5	
Queensland Labor	William Tresillian	1,299	11.6	
Communist	Walter Stubbins	141	1.3	
Total formal votes		11,213	98.5	
Informal votes		169	1.5	
Turnout		11,382	92.0	
Labor win		(new seat)		

=== Sandgate ===
1960 Queensland state election: Sandgate
Party	Candidate	Votes	%	±%
Labor	Harry Dean	4,990	50.8	
Liberal	Thomas Ahearn	4,112	41.8	
Queensland Labor	Hindrick Lokhorst	727	7.4	
Total formal votes		9,829	98.7	
Informal votes		126	1.3	
Turnout		9,955	92.3	
Labor gain from Liberal		Swing		

=== Sherwood ===
1960 Queensland state election: Sherwood
Party	Candidate	Votes	%	±%
Liberal	John Herbert	7,107	62.9	
Labor	Gordon Thomson	4,190	37.1	
Total formal votes		11,297	98.5	
Informal votes		173	1.5	
Turnout		11,470	93.8	
Liberal hold		Swing		

=== Somerset ===
1960 Queensland state election: Somerset
Party	Candidate	Votes	%	±%
Country	Harold Richter	4,860	55.1	
Queensland Labor	Alexander Skinner	2,291	26.0	
Labor	Robert Warren	1,672	19.0	
Total formal votes		8,823	98.6	
Informal votes		126	1.4	
Turnout		8,949	94.1	
Country hold		Swing		

=== South Brisbane ===
1960 Queensland state election: South Brisbane
Party	Candidate	Votes	%	±%
Labor	Col Bennett	5,011	43.9	
Queensland Labor	Vince Gair	3,294	28.9	
Liberal	Charles O'Brien	3,106	27.2	
Total formal votes		11,411	98.2	
Informal votes		209	1.8	
Turnout		11,620	88.0	
Labor gain from Queensland Labor		Swing		

=== South Coast ===
1960 Queensland state election: South Coast
Party	Candidate	Votes	%	±%
Country	Eric Gaven	6,611	75.9	
Labor	William Darveniza	1,872	21.5	
Independent	John Fitzgerald	223	2.6	
Total formal votes		8,706	98.2	
Informal votes		163	1.8	
Turnout		8,869	87.4	
Country win		(new seat)		

=== Tablelands ===
1960 Queensland state election: Tablelands
Party	Candidate	Votes	%	±%
Country	Tom Gilmore	3,438	52.8	
Labor	Edwin Wallis-Smith	2,633	40.4	
Queensland Labor	Arthur Mottarelly	442	6.8	
Total formal votes		6,513	98.1	
Informal votes		123	1.9	
Turnout		6,636	87.4	
Country hold		Swing		

=== Toowong ===
1960 Queensland state election: Toowong
Party	Candidate	Votes	%	±%
Liberal	Alan Munro	8,200	78.7	
Queensland Labor	Roger Judge	2,222	21.3	
Total formal votes		10,422	95.0	
Informal votes		553	5.0	
Turnout		10,975	91.7	
Liberal hold		Swing		

=== Toowoomba East ===
1960 Queensland state election: Toowoomba East
Party	Candidate	Votes	%	±%
Liberal	Mervyn Anderson	6,019	47.2	
Labor	Peter Wood	5,922	46.4	
Queensland Labor	Leonard Green	818	6.4	
Total formal votes		12,759	99.2	
Informal votes		97	0.8	
Turnout		12,856	93.3	
Liberal win		(new seat)		

=== Toowoomba West ===
1960 Queensland state election: Toowoomba West
Party	Candidate	Votes	%	±%
Labor	Jack Duggan	7,414	55.3	
Liberal	Lawrence Storey	4,768	35.5	
Queensland Labor	Kenneth Rawle	1,229	9.2	
Total formal votes		13,411	99.3	
Informal votes		92	0.7	
Turnout		13,503	93.4	
Labor win		(new seat)		

=== Townsville North ===
1960 Queensland state election: Townsville North
Party	Candidate	Votes	%	±%
Labor	Perc Tucker	5,262	43.4	
Liberal	Roy Annable	4,140	34.1	
Queensland Labor	Ronald Comerford	1,655	13.6	
Independent	Archibald Hooper	871	7.2	
Communist	P.F. Bishop	208	1.7	
Total formal votes		12,136	98.6	
Informal votes		166	1.4	
Turnout		12,302	92.9	
Labor win		(new seat)		

=== Townsville South ===
1960 Queensland state election: Townsville South
Party	Candidate	Votes	%	±%
NQ Labor	Tom Aikens	8,501	66.8	
Labor	Bill Edmonds	4,216	33.2	
Total formal votes		12,717	98.3	
Informal votes		223	1.7	
Turnout		12,940	93.3	
NQ Labor win		(new seat)		

=== Warrego ===
1960 Queensland state election: Warrego
Party	Candidate	Votes	%	±%
Labor	John Dufficy	4,630	66.7	
Queensland Labor	John Glynn	2,307	33.3	
Total formal votes		6,937	97.0	
Informal votes		213	3.0	
Turnout		7,150	87.4	
Labor hold		Swing		

=== Warwick ===
1960 Queensland state election: Warwick
Party	Candidate	Votes	%	±%
Country	Otto Madsen	5,437	63.9	
Labor	Reggie Wenham	1,818	21.4	
Queensland Labor	George Campbell	1,254	14.7	
Total formal votes		8,509	98.7	
Informal votes		108	1.3	
Turnout		8,617	94.6	
Country hold		Swing		

=== Wavell ===
1960 Queensland state election: Wavell
Party	Candidate	Votes	%	±%
Liberal	Alex Dewar	7,134	53.7	
Labor	Benjamin Harriss	4,696	35.3	
Queensland Labor	Kevin O'Dea	1,459	11.0	
Total formal votes		13,289	98.9	
Informal votes		144	1.1	
Turnout		13,433	94.9	
Liberal win		(new seat)		

=== Whitsunday ===
1960 Queensland state election: Whitsunday
Party	Candidate	Votes	%	±%
Country	Lloyd Roberts	4,341	56.8	
Labor	Stanley Dalton	2,669	34.9	
Queensland Labor	Bernard Lewis	631	8.3	
Total formal votes		7,641	98.9	
Informal votes		83	1.1	
Turnout		7,724	92.4	
Country hold		Swing		

==== By-election ====
- This by-election was caused by the death of Lloyd Roberts. It was held on 1 July 1961.

1961 Whitsunday state by-election
Party	Candidate	Votes	%	±%
Country	Ron Camm	3,531	48.9	−7.9
Labor	William Graves	3,002	41.5	+6.6
Queensland Labor	Peter Dempsey	694	9.6	+1.3
Total formal votes		7,227	99.5	+0.6
Informal votes		37	0.5	−0.6
Turnout		7,264	88.5	−3.9
Country hold		Swing	N/A	

=== Windsor ===
1960 Queensland state election: Windsor
Party	Candidate	Votes	%	±%
Liberal	Ray Smith	5,364	49.9	
Labor	George Georgouras	3,834	35.7	
Queensland Labor	Percy Hotham	1,541	14.3	
Total formal votes		10,739	99.2	
Informal votes		90	0.8	
Turnout		10,829	93.5	
Liberal hold		Swing		

=== Wynnum ===
1960 Queensland state election: Wynnum
Party	Candidate	Votes	%	±%
Labor	Bill Gunn	7,789	63.4	
Liberal	George Dodd	3,684	30.0	
Queensland Labor	George Campbell	819	6.7	
Total formal votes		12,292	98.9	
Informal votes		130	1.1	
Turnout		12,422	92.7	
Labor hold		Swing		

=== Yeronga ===
1960 Queensland state election: Yeronga
Party	Candidate	Votes	%	±%
Liberal	Winston Noble	5,594	51.4	
Labor	John O'Donnell	4,085	37.6	
Queensland Labor	Francis Wickings	1,196	11.0	
Total formal votes		10,875	98.9	
Informal votes		124	1.1	
Turnout		10,999	93.9	
Liberal hold		Swing		

== See also ==
- 1960 Queensland state election
- Candidates of the Queensland state election, 1960
- Members of the Queensland Legislative Assembly, 1960-1963
