= Politics of Toowoomba, Queensland =

== Local government ==
Toowoomba, (governed by the Toowoomba Regional Council), throughout the last twenty years has seen the rapid growth of satellite towns and an expanding urban fringe in the surrounding localities of Crows Nest, Cambooya, Cooyar and Oakey. Urbanisation has changed the demographics of the Toowoomba Region significantly, displacing their centres of power to the Toowoomba urban fringe.

Former Toowoomba councillor Lyle Shelton called for the boundaries of the old Toowoomba City Council to be expanded to encompass the area some refer to as "Greater Toowoomba". March 2008 saw the Toowoomba City Council replaced by the Toowoomba Regional Council.

=== Former Toowoomba City Council ===
The City of Toowoomba was a local government area in Queensland, approximately 150 kilometres (93 mi) west of Brisbane.

Elections were held every four years (previously every three years) with ballots for the mayoralty and the councillors being held simultaneously. Voting was compulsory for all eligible electors. Councillors were elected from a single pool of candidates by a "First Past the Post" poll, Toowoomba having abandoned the system of wards (electorates).

As with other local governments in Queensland, Toowoomba City Council was bound by the Local Government Act 1993. Under this act and other legislation, the state government had devolved the power to make local laws (previously by-laws) onto Toowoomba City Council.

Toowoomba City Council offered a variety of cultural services to the community, including the Municipal Library and the Toowoomba Art Gallery. The council restored and substantially funded the Empire Theatre.

The main offices for the council were at the Toowoomba City Hall complex clustered around the northwest corner of Ruthven and Herries Streets.

After former Premier of Queensland, Peter Beattie, announced his program of LGA amalgamations in 2007, Toowoomba City Council began the transition to becoming part of the Toowoomba Regional Council. The March 2008 local government elections marked the end of over a century as a city.

=== Toowoomba Regional Council ===
A council of 10 councillors and a Mayor are elected every four years, alongside other LGAs in Queensland. There has been 3 local elections since amalgamation. Cr Peter Taylor, from the Jondaryan (Oakey) Shire was re-elected as the Mayor to serve for the entire region. From 2012, Deputy Mayor, Paul Antonio, won the mayoral election. He subsequently won the 2016 election, therefore being the incumbent Mayor.

The ballots for the mayoralty and the councillors are held simultaneously. Voting is compulsory for all eligible electors. Councillors are elected from a single pool of candidates by a "First Past the Post" poll, The system of wards (electorates) being recommended against by the Local Government Reform Commission.

== State politics ==
The two seats that are drawn from Toowoomba City itself are Toowoomba North and Toowoomba South. Toowoomba South is a very safe seat for the Liberal National Party. Former mayor, Di Thorley ran for the 2016 Toowoomba South by-election. In the absence of a Labor candidate, she picked up momentum, especially from the more progressive voters, however, the LNP's David Janetzki won.

In the 2012 election, Kerry Shine, a member of the Labor Party, lost the seat of Toowoomba North to the LNP's Trevor Watts, a member of the Newman government. Watts, retained the seat by a small majority in the 2016 election. Unlike the rest of the city, Toowoomba North has been known to be considerably more left-leaning when electing members.

The seat of Condamine is a rural seat that includes many western suburbs and localities, including Charlton, Wellcamp, Glenvale, Drayton etc. This seat is also conservative, generally electing LNP and Katter's Australian party. After Ray Hopper resigned from the seat to contest Nanango, Pat Weir from the LNP took the seat by a large majority in 2015.

=== Historical seats ===
- Drayton & Toowoomba 1860 – 1912
- Drayton 1912 – 1927
- Toowoomba 1912 – 1950
- East Toowoomba 1912 – 1950
- South Toowoomba 1950 – 1960
- North Toowoomba 1950 – 1960
- Toowoomba East 1960 – 1972
- Toowoomba West 1960 – 1972
- Toowoomba South 1972–present
- Toowoomba North 1972–present
- Condamine 2009–present (Outskirts)

== Federal politics ==
Toowoomba has formed the core of a Commonwealth electoral seat since Federation. Originally Darling Downs, the seat was abolished and the new seat of Groom was created in 1984, with the effect (largely) of renaming the seat. The seat has always been held by the non-Labor parties.

John McVeigh, a member of the LNP has held the seat since 2016. To contest the 2016 election, he resigned from his state seat of Toowoomba South.

The Toowoomba Region has a strong conservative influence in politics, particularly socially. Groom is a very safe LNP seat, with McVeigh winning 65.31% of the two-party preferred vote. Although suburbs between North Street and the Second Range Crossing show strengthening progressive influence, the rural parts of the seat are much too conservative to feasibly see a Labor member elected.

== Significant political events in Toowoomba ==
During the 1989 Queensland state elections, the Toowoomba-based Logos Foundation caused controversy with a questionnaire on "moral" issues sent to candidates, with the results being published in newspaper advertisements.

In 2003 Aboriginal activist Stephen Hagan created a stir over the name of the "E.S. Nigger Brown Stand" at a Toowoomba sports field. E S Brown was an Anglo-Australian, who was known as "Nigger Brown" during his career as a rugby league footballer. Brown was given the nickname due to a popular boot polish at the time and his "slick" attack whilst on the football field and was known to be slick as boot polish hence the nickname Nigger Brown. He has also challenged Coon cheese over claims that the name was racist.

In 2005 a white supremacist group calling itself the White Pride Coalition put up racist posters in Toowoomba and Crows Nest, harassed African (mostly Sudanese) refugees living in Toowoomba and achieved national notoriety.

In 2005 Mayor Di Thorley proposed a controversial plan to recycle purified treated sewage into one of the dams to be used for drinking water. On 29 July 2006 the Toowoomba City Council conducted a poll regarding this controversial plan. The poll question was:

Do you support the addition of purified recycled water to Toowoomba’s water supply via Cooby Dam as proposed by Water Futures –Toowoomba?

A majority of 62% of voters opposed the plan.
