= Electoral results for the district of Toowoomba West =

Queensland, Australia, district election results

This is a list of electoral results for the electoral district of Toowoomba West in Queensland state elections.

== Members for Toowoomba West ==
Member	Party	Term
Jack Duggan	Labor	1960–1969
Ray Bousen	Labor	1969–1972

== Election results ==
=== Elections in the 1960s ===
1969 Queensland state election: Toowoomba West
Party	Candidate	Votes	%	±%
Labor	Ray Bousen	7,489	48.0	−13.8
Country	John Peel	4,191	26.8	+26.8
Liberal	Leigh Wallman	2,563	16.4	−12.5
Queensland Labor	John Davis	1,371	8.8	−0.5
Total formal votes		15,614	98.7	−0.1
Informal votes		209	1.3	+0.1
Turnout		15,823	93.1	−2.4
Two-party-preferred result
Labor	Ray Bousen	7,896	50.6	−12.9
Country	John Peel	7,718	49.4	+49.4
Labor hold		Swing	−12.9	

1966 Queensland state election: Toowoomba West
Party	Candidate	Votes	%	±%
Labor	Jack Duggan	8,912	61.8	+3.5
Liberal	Clifford Leavy	4,162	28.9	−4.6
Queensland Labor	Terry Morris	1,347	9.3	+1.1
Total formal votes		14,421	98.8	+0.1
Informal votes		173	1.2	−0.1
Turnout		14,594	95.5	+0.9
Two-party-preferred result
Labor	Jack Duggan	9,163	63.5	+3.7
Liberal	Clifford Leavy	5,258	36.5	−3.7
Labor hold		Swing	+3.7	

1963 Queensland state election: Toowoomba West
Party	Candidate	Votes	%	±%
Labor	Jack Duggan	8,047	58.3	+3.0
Liberal	August Dietz	4,628	33.5	−2.0
Queensland Labor	Terry Morris	1,129	8.2	−1.0
Total formal votes		13,804	98.7	−0.6
Informal votes		184	1.3	+0.6
Turnout		13,988	94.6	+1.2
Two-party-preferred result
Labor	Jack Duggan	8,257	59.8	
Liberal	August Dietz	5,547	40.2	
Labor hold		Swing	N/A	

1960 Queensland state election: Toowoomba West
Party	Candidate	Votes	%	±%
Labor	Jack Duggan	7,414	55.3	
Liberal	Lawrence Storey	4,768	35.5	
Queensland Labor	Kenneth Rawle	1,229	9.2	
Total formal votes		13,411	99.3	
Informal votes		92	0.7	
Turnout		13,503	93.4	
Labor win		(new seat)		
