= Electoral results for the district of Toowoomba East =

Queensland, Australia, district election results

This is a list of electoral results for the electoral district of Toowoomba East in Queensland state elections.

== Members for Toowoomba East ==
Member	Party	Term
Mervyn Anderson	Liberal	1960–1966
Peter Wood	Labor	1966–1972

== Election results ==
=== Elections in the 1960s ===
1969 Queensland state election: Toowoomba East
Party	Candidate	Votes	%	±%
Labor	Peter Wood	7,993	53.4	+1.5
Liberal	Sydney Goodrick	6,012	40.2	+24.4
Queensland Labor	Francis Mullins	954	6.4	+0.9
Total formal votes		14,959	98.8	+0.4
Informal votes		182	1.2	−0.4
Turnout		15,141	92.5	−2.3
Two-party-preferred result
Labor	Peter Wood	8,170	54.6	−0.7
Liberal	Sydney Goodrick	6,789	45.4	+45.4
Labor hold		Swing	−0.7	

1966 Queensland state election: Toowoomba East
Party	Candidate	Votes	%	±%
Labor	Peter Wood	7,814	51.9	+3.0
Country	John McCafferty	3,668	26.5	+26.5
Liberal	Lawrence Storey	2,183	15.8	−29.8
Queensland Labor	Francis Mullins	761	5.5	0.0
Independent	Gladys O'Sullivan	58	0.4	+0.4
Total formal votes		13,854	98.6	−0.5
Informal votes		200	1.4	+0.5
Turnout		14,054	94.8	0.0
Two-party-preferred result
Labor	Peter Wood	7,661	55.3	+5.4
Country	John McCafferty	6,193	44.7	+44.7
Labor gain from Liberal		Swing	+5.4	

1963 Queensland state election: Toowoomba East
Party	Candidate	Votes	%	±%
Labor	Peter Wood	6,454	48.9	+2.5
Liberal	Mervyn Anderson	6,026	45.6	−1.6
Queensland Labor	Frank Mullins	726	5.5	−0.9
Total formal votes		13,206	99.1	−0.1
Informal votes		120	0.9	+0.1
Turnout		13,326	94.8	+1.5
Two-party-preferred result
Liberal	Mervyn Anderson	6,615	50.1	
Labor	Peter Wood	6,591	49.9	
Liberal hold		Swing	N/A	

1960 Queensland state election: Toowoomba East
Party	Candidate	Votes	%	±%
Liberal	Mervyn Anderson	6,019	47.2	
Labor	Peter Wood	5,922	46.4	
Queensland Labor	Leonard Green	818	6.4	
Total formal votes		12,759	99.2	
Informal votes		97	0.8	
Turnout		12,856	93.3	
Liberal win		(new seat)		
