= Guelfi Scassola =

Australian politician

Member of the Queensland Legislative Assembly for Mount Gravatt
- In office 12 November 1977 – 22 October 1983
- Preceded by: Geoff Chinchen
- Succeeded by: Ian Henderson

Personal details
- Born: Guelfi Paul Scassola; 19 April 1940 Innisfail, Queensland, Australia
- Died: 27 August 2002 (aged 62) Brisbane, Queensland, Australia
- Resting place: Mt Gravatt Cemetery
- Party: Liberal Party
- Spouse: Denise Dorothea Nixon
- Children: Mark born 1975 and David born 1976
- Education: University of Queensland
- Occupation: Solicitor

Guelfi Paul Scassola (19 April 1940 – 27 August 2002) was an Australian politician. He was a Liberal Party member of the Legislative Assembly of Queensland from 1977 until 1983, representing the electorate of Mount Gravatt.

Scassola was born in Innisfail, the son of a cane farmer. He was raised and educated in north Queensland, attending Silkwood State Primary School and Silkwood Convent School, but his father died when he was twelve, and facing hard times, his family relocated to Brisbane. He subsequently attended St Stephen's School, St Patrick's School, Kangaroo Point State Primary School, and Brisbane State High School, before graduating in law from the University of Queensland in 1963. He did his articled clerkship at the firm of senior Liberal Party figure Leo Catt, and thereafter became a solicitor. Scassola was involved in the Liberal Party for many years, serving on the state council of the Young Liberals from 1964 to 1967, the state executive of the party from 1958 to 1968 and from 1969 to 1973, the state policy committee from 1969 to 1977, the party's federal council from 1971 to 1975, and as its Queensland state vice-president from 1963 until 1977.

Scassola was elected to the Legislative Assembly at the 1977 election, winning the seat of Mount Gravatt upon the retirement of Liberal MLA Geoff Chinchen. He was particularly concerned with family and disability issues as an MLA, the later stemming from his experience as the father of a son with Down syndrome. He was a member of the "Ginger Group" of Liberal MLAs who wished to assert a more distinct voice for the Liberal Party, and were concerned about government accountability and the little weight given by Premier Bjelke-Petersen to Liberal opposition to certain decisions.

In 1983, Scassola was one of eight Liberals who crossed the floor to vote with Labor over the creation of a public accounts committee. The vote sparked an angry response from Premier Joh Bjelke-Petersen and Liberal leader Llewellyn Edwards, and Edwards subsequently sacked Terry White, the Minister for Welfare Services and one of the dissenting MLAs, from Cabinet. Scassola subsequently supported White's successful leadership challenge against Edwards. Bjelke-Petersen refused to recognise White as Deputy Premier; the resulting conflict saw White break the decades-old Liberal-National coalition. In the 1983 state election, held a short time later, the Liberal Party was badly defeated, losing several seats to the National Party. Scassola was one of those defeated, losing his seat to National Ian Henderson. Scassola contested Mount Gravatt twice more unsuccessfully: in 1986, when he again lost to Henderson, and in 1989, when he lost to Labor candidate Judy Spence.

Scassola returned to his legal practice after his parliamentary defeat. He was heavily involved in public life outside politics, serving as the foundation president of the Down's Syndrome Association, as president of the Brisbane Metropolitan branch of the Lions Club, and serving as patron of and providing free legal assistance to numerous other community organisations.

He died in Brisbane in August 2002.

Parliament of Queensland
Preceded by Geoff Chinchen	Member for Mount Gravatt; 1977–1983	Succeeded by Ian Henderson
