= Electoral district of North Toowoomba =

North Toowoomba Queensland—Legislative Assembly
- State: Queensland
- Created: 1950
- Abolished: 1960
- Namesake: Toowoomba

North Toowoomba was an electoral district of the Legislative Assembly in the Australian state of Queensland. It was created with the 1950 redistribution and removed by the 1960 redistribution.

The seat was based on the City of Toowoomba.

The sitting member, John Duggan, successfully stood for election in the new seat of Toowoomba West in the 1960 election.

== Members for North Toowoomba ==
Member	Party	Term
Les Wood	Labor	1950–1958
Jack Duggan	Labor	1958–1960

== See also ==
- Historical Seats of Toowoomba
- Electoral districts of Queensland
- Members of the Queensland Legislative Assembly by year
- Category:Members of the Queensland Legislative Assembly by name
