= Les Wood (politician) =

Australian politician

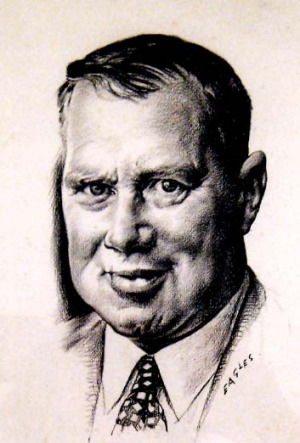

Leader of the Opposition in Queensland Leader of the Labor Party in Queensland
- In office 28 August 1957 – 29 March 1958
- Deputy: Eric Lloyd
- Preceded by: Frank Nicklin (Opposition); Jack Duggan (Labor)
- Succeeded by: Jim Donald

Member of the Queensland Legislative Assembly for North Toowoomba
- In office 29 April 1950 – 29 March 1958
- Preceded by: New seat
- Succeeded by: Jack Duggan

Member of the Queensland Legislative Assembly for East Toowoomba
- In office 2 March 1946 – 3 May 1947
- Preceded by: Herbert Yeates
- Succeeded by: Gordon Chalk

Personal details
- Born: Leslie Arnold Wood; 6 March 1907 Toowoomba, Queensland, Australia
- Died: 29 March 1958 (aged 51) Toowoomba, Queensland, Australia
- Resting place: Drayton and Toowoomba Cemetery
- Party: Labor
- Spouse: Anne Alice Margaret Reyment (m.1928 d.2001)
- Relations: Peter Wood & Bill Wood (identical twin sons)
- Occupation: School teacher

Leslie Arnold Wood (6 March 1907 – 29 March 1958) was a school teacher and member of the Queensland Legislative Assembly. He was the Leader of the Opposition in Queensland for seven months in 1957–1958.

== Biography ==
Wood was born in Toowoomba, Queensland, to parents Joseph Emanuel Wood and Fredrika Johanna Henrietta (née Hoepper). He was educated at Middle Ridge State School in Toowoomba before attending Maryborough Central State School and Maryborough Grammar School. He took up teaching at Maryborough West State School and then returned to Toowoomba to carry on his teaching duties at Newtown and East Toowoomba.

From 1941 until 1945 he was a member of the AIF reaching the rank of Captain in the 3rd Division and saw service at Milne Bay, Madang, and Bougainville.

On 22 December 1928 he married Anne Alice Margaret Reyment (died 2001) and had three sons and one daughter including identical twins Bill and Peter who themselves went on to be members of the Queensland Legislative Assembly. He was a Past Master of the Melrose Masonic Lodge and a president and referee in the Toowoomba Rugby League. He was also a member of the Toowoomba Bowls Club and the RAOB.

Wood died of a heart attack at his home in March 1958. He was given a state funeral, the first time it was accorded to an opposition leader. The funeral service was packed (Wood had been an exceptionally popular parliamentarian, esteemed even by his political opponents) and hundreds of people stood outside the church to pay their last respects. There were 140 cars in the funeral cortege as it made its way to the Drayton and Toowoomba Cemetery for his burial.

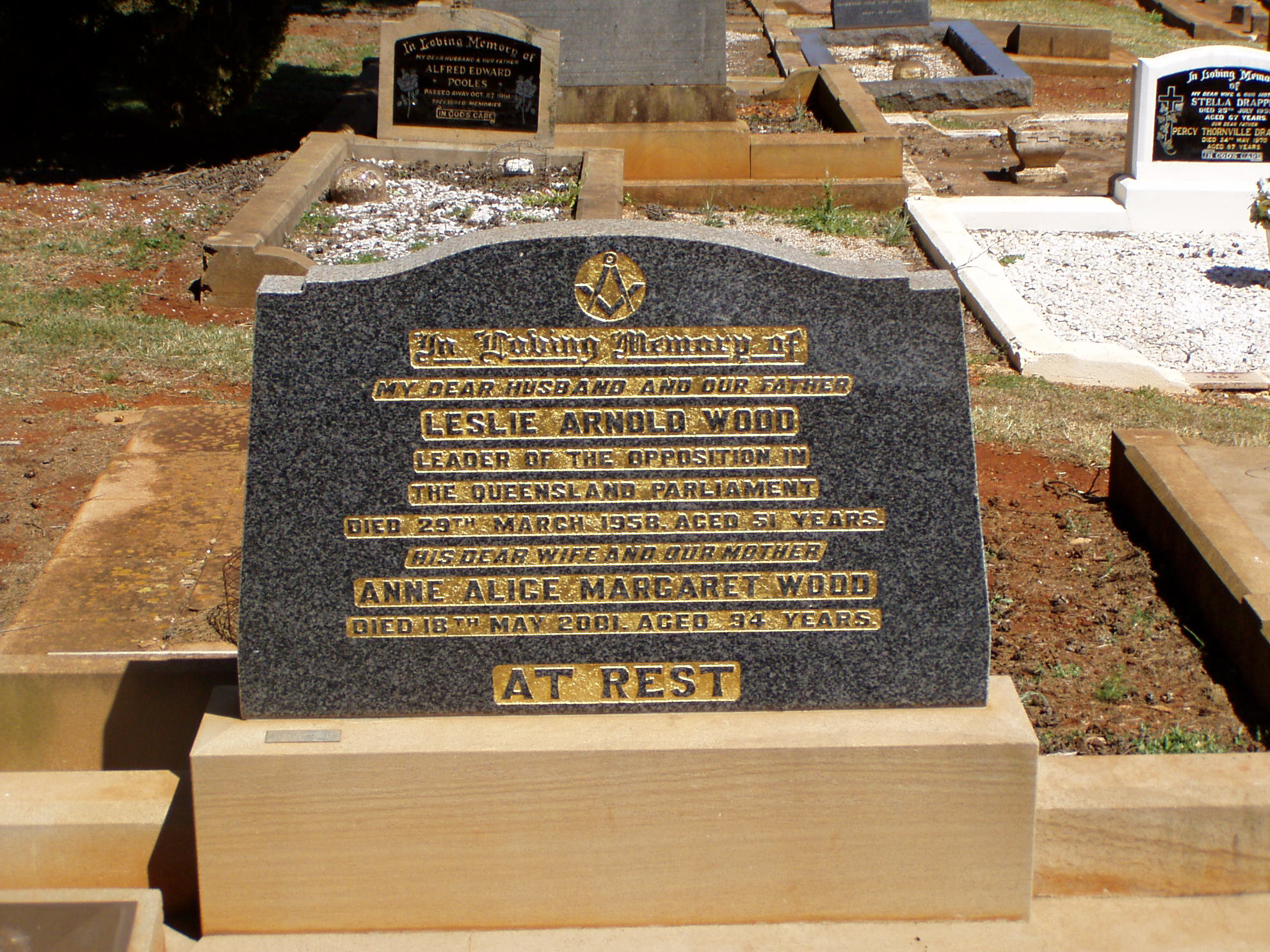
Leslie Arnold Wood's headstone at Drayton and Toowoomba Cemetery

== Political career ==
Wood, for the Labor Party, won the 1946 by-election for the seat of East Toowoomba following the death of Herbert Yeates the previous December. There was a state election the next year however and Wood lost the seat to future Deputy Premier and for 1 week, Queensland Premier, Gordon Chalk.

Out of politics for three years, Wood contested the new seat of North Toowoomba at the 1950 state election, and defeated the Liberal candidate, Ralph Weppner. He held North Toowoomba until his death in 1958.

In 1957, the Labor Party split with Premier Vince Gair and most of his Cabinet being expelled from the party. This left Jack Duggan as the new Labor leader but Gair lost supply and an election was called for 3 August 1957. Duggan lost his seat and Wood found himself leader of what was left of the Labor Party. He held the role until his death the next year and on 1 April 1958, parliament gave glowing praise to Wood in a motion of condolence.

Political offices
Preceded by Frank Nicklin	Leader of the Opposition of Queensland; 1957–1958	Succeeded by Jim Donald
Parliament of Queensland
Preceded by Herbert Yeates	Member for East Toowoomba; 1946–1947	Succeeded by Gordon Chalk
New seat	Member for North Toowoomba; 1950–1958	Succeeded by Jack Duggan
