= Shine Lawyers =

Australian legal firm specialising in personal injury compensation

- Type: Public law firm
- Traded as: ASX: SHJ (Shine Justice Group)
- Industry: Legal Industry
- Founded: 1976; 50 years ago as KG Shine & Co
- Founder: Kerry Shine, Simon Morrison & Stephen Roche
- Headquarters: Brisbane, Queensland
- Area served: Australia
- Services: Personal injury law, compensation law, workers compensation law, car accident claims, public liability claims, toxic exposure, silica and dust disease claims, class actions, abuse law, product liability, medical negligence, brain injury claims, workplace claims and super and insurance claims.
- Parent: Shine Justice
- Website: shine.com.au

Shine Lawyers is an Australian law firm specialising in personal injury compensation law, operating on a no win no fee basis. The firm has expanded into providing toxic exposure, silica and dust disease, abuse and medical negligence services through a number of acquisitions.

Founded in Toowoomba in 1976, the firm is now headquartered in Brisbane, Australia, and currently has over 700 employees based across more than 40 offices across Australia and New Zealand. The firm featured in a Four Corners documentary accused of gross overcharging in class actions and for exploitation of vulnerable class members.

== History ==
Shine Lawyers was founded in 1976 (then known as KG Shine & Co) by Kerry Shine, an Australian Labor Party politician who was member of the Legislative Assembly from 2001 to 2012 and Attorney-General of Queensland from 2006 to 2009. It was rebranded as Shine Lawyers in 2006, under then managing partner Stephen Roche and current managing director Simon Morrison. It was one of the first law firms in the world to list on the ASX, in May 2013.

== Acquisitions and mergers ==
Since 1976 Shine Lawyers has acquired and integrated more than 20 other legal firms. Shine has also expanded into the US market under the name Shine Lawyers US, LLC, licensed in Arizona to collaborate with local law firms.

== Notable current and past cases ==
Since 1976, Shine Lawyers have handled some difficult and widely publicised cases that have come before Australian Courts.

- In 2001, Shine Lawyers represented a woman who had suffered abuse as a student at Toowoomba Preparatory School. The civil court decision awarded a record payout to the victim, and a subsequent inquiry contributed to the resignation of the governor-general Peter Hollingworth.
- Notable personal injury cases include the car accident compensation case for Ray and Marion Whitley, the medical negligence compensation case for Zac Ward, and the workers’ compensation case for Steven Reynolds.
- Shine Lawyers assisted in early dust disease and toxic exposure cases on behalf of stonemasons and other workers exposed to silica and dust, helping to reshape Australian workplace safety legislation around toxic dust exposure and worker compensation.
- After the 2016 Thunder River Rapids Ride tragedy at Dreamworld, Shine Lawyers provided support to staff and first responders dealing with psychological injuries and trauma, advocating recognition of Post Traumatic Stress Disorder (PTSD) in the workplace.
- Shine Lawyers represented the father of a choirboy in a civil claim against Cardinal George Pell and the Catholic Church, seeking civil accountability for historic child sexual abuse, even after the High Court overturned Pell’s criminal convictions.

== Notable class actions ==
- On 27 September 2011, Shine Lawyers commenced a class action against DePuy International Ltd and Johnson & Johnson on behalf of Australians affected by faulty DePuy ASR hip implants. It is alleged that the DePuy ASR hip implants were defective, not fit for their intended purpose and/or not of merchantable quality, in contravention of provisions of the Trade Practices Act 1974 (Cth).
- On 16 October 2012, Shine Lawyers commenced a class action against Johnson & Johnson and Ethicon on behalf of Australians suffering complications as a result of faulty prolapse mesh implants. In March 2020, the Federal Court decided in favour of the three lead applicants, awarding them $2.6 million in damages. Johnson & Johnson’s appeal was dismissed in March 2021. On 5 November 2021, the High Court of Australia dismissed Johnson & Johnson’s application for special leave to appeal.
- In 2020, Shine Lawyers settled three PFAS contamination class actions against the Commonwealth of Australia (Department of Defence), representing landholders in Oakey (Queensland), Katherine (Northern Territory) and Williamtown (New South Wales). The Federal Court approved a AU$212.5 million settlement in June 2020.
- In 2022, Shine Lawyers reached an in-principle AU$300 million settlement in two class actions against Johnson & Johnson Medical and Ethicon over pelvic mesh implants. The Federal Court approved the settlement in March 2022, making it the largest product liability class action settlement in Australian history.
- In 2023, Shine Lawyers secured a AU$105 million settlement in a separate pelvic mesh class action against Boston Scientific. The settlement was approved by the Federal Court in March 2023 without admission of liability.
- In 2023, Shine Lawyers settled a shareholder class action against Ardent Leisure, the parent company of Dreamworld, relating to alleged misleading disclosures following the 2016 Thunder River Rapids Ride tragedy. The Federal Court approved a AU$26 million settlement in August 2023.
- In 2021, Shine Lawyers launched a class action on behalf of members of the Northern Territory Stolen Generations. The claim was settled in 2022 for AU$50 million, benefiting more than 1,700 survivors and estates.
- In 2023, Shine Lawyers settled the Western Australian Stolen Wages Class Action on behalf of Aboriginal and Torres Strait Islander people whose wages were withheld between 1936 and 1972. The Federal Court approved a settlement of more than AU$180 million in December 2024, and the WA Government issued a formal apology.

== Justices criticisms of fees charged by Shine Lawyers ==
In at least two cases, presiding Justices have criticised the fees charged by Shine Lawyers. In a West Australian stolen wages class action, Justice Murphy said:

Standing back and taking an overall view, even having regard to the difficulties associated with the characteristics of the cohort of class members in this case, such fees are seriously overblown. It may not be the whole cause but it seems likely the costs blowout can be largely put down to excessive hourly rates charged by Shine for its unqualified law clerks. Even after the costs referee’s reductions, and discounts which Shine proposes, I consider the overall costs to be too high.

In a second class action brought by Shine Lawyers against Westpac, the Australian Financial Review reported that

Justice Lee took aim at the fees being charged by independent experts and travel fees charged by the lawyers, while also singling out as excessive the pleading fees charged by the lawyers. “An extraordinary amount of money has been charged for the preparation of pleadings and that’s no criticism of Shine,” Justice Lee said.

The article notes that the lawyers claimed more than $10 million in costs, which would reduce the amount payable to group members to as little as $222 each.
