= John Lockwood (Australian politician) =

Australian politician

Dr. John Lockwood

Member of the Queensland Legislative Assembly for Toowoomba North
- In office 7 December 1974 – 22 October 1983
- Preceded by: Ray Bousen
- Succeeded by: Sandy McPhie

Personal details
- Born: John Aubrey Ross Lockwood; 18 July 1936 (age 90) Babinda, Queensland, Australia
- Party: Liberal Party
- Spouse: Robbyn Glenyss Vickery (m.1964)
- Education: University of Queensland
- Occupation: Medical practitioner

John Aubrey Ross Lockwood (born 18 July 1936) was a member of the Queensland Legislative Assembly.

== Biography ==
Lockwood was born at Babinda, Queensland, the son of Arthur William Lockwood and his wife Ailsa Marian (née Ross). He was educated at Wynnum Central State School, Manly State School, and Wynnum High School before going on to the University of Queensland where he graduated in 1962 with a BS and BM. From 1956 to 1959 he was called up for national service.

In 1967, Lockwood was a medical practitioner in Toowoomba and was then the resident medical officer at the Ipswich General Hospital. Finally, he was the government medical officer in Toowoomba from 1970 to 1974.

On 8 August 1964 he married Robbyn Glenyss Vickery and together had three sons and two daughters.

== Public career ==
Lockwood won the seat of Toowoomba North for the Liberal Party at the 1974 Queensland state election, defeating the sitting member, Ray Bousen of the Labor Party. Lockwood went on to represent the electorate until 1983 where he lost to Sandy McPhie of the National Party.

Parliament of Queensland
| Preceded by Ray Bousen | Member for Toowoomba North; 1974–1983 | Succeeded by Sandy McPhie |
