= Jack Duggan (politician) =

Australian politician

The Honourable Jack Duggan OAM
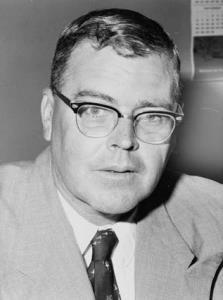
- Duggan in 1963.

16th Deputy Premier of Queensland
- In office 16 March 1953 – 7 June 1957
- Premier: Vince Gair
- Preceded by: Tom Foley
- Succeeded by: Ted Walsh

Leader of the Opposition of Queensland
- In office 18 August 1958 – 11 October 1966
- Deputy: Eric Lloyd; Jack Houston
- Preceded by: Jim Donald
- Succeeded by: Jack Houston

Leader of the Labor Party in Queensland Elections: 1957, 1960, 1963, 1966
- In office 18 August 1958 – 11 October 1966
- Deputy: Eric Lloyd (1958–1966); Jack Houston (1966)
- Preceded by: Jim Donald
- Succeeded by: Jack Houston
- In office 24 April 1957 – 15 August 1957
- Deputy: Felix Dittmer
- Preceded by: Vince Gair
- Succeeded by: Les Wood

Deputy Leader of the Labor Party in Queensland
- In office 16 March 1953 – 24 April 1957
- Leader: Vince Gair
- Preceded by: Tom Foley
- Succeeded by: Felix Dittmer

Member of the Queensland Legislative Assembly for Toowoomba West North Toowoomba (1958–1960)
- In office 31 May 1958 – 17 May 1969
- Preceded by: Les Wood
- Succeeded by: Ray Bousen

Member of the Queensland Legislative Assembly for Toowoomba
- In office 14 December 1935 – 3 August 1957
- Preceded by: Evan Llewelyn
- Succeeded by: Mervyn Anderson

Personal details
- Born: John Edmund Duggan; 30 December 1910 Port Augusta, South Australia, Australia
- Died: 19 June 1993 (aged 82) Toowoomba, Queensland, Australia
- Resting place: Drayton and Toowoomba Cemetery
- Party: Labor
- Spouse: Beatrice Mary Dunne (m.1935 d.1984)
- Occupation: Shop assistant

John Edmund Duggan (30 December 1910 – 19 June 1993) was a member of the Queensland Legislative Assembly. He was the Deputy Premier of Queensland from 1953 until 1957 and Leader of the Opposition of Queensland from 1958 until 1966.

== Early life ==
Duggan was born at Port Augusta, South Australia, the son of John Stephen Duggan and his wife Charlotte (née Mathieson). He was educated at the Marree and Hoyleton primary schools before attending a Marist Brothers college in South Australia. By the age of 14 he was orphaned with his mother dying in December 1922 during child birth and his father dying from spinal tuberculosis two years later and Duggan and his siblings were cared for by an auntie and uncle in Toowoomba. He then left school and took up a job as a sales assistant to help support his younger brothers and sisters.

He gained official leave from parliament to join the Australian Army in 1941 during World War II, serving in the 25th Battalion seeing action in New Guinea. By the time he was discharged in 1944 he had risen to the rank of captain.

== Political career ==
Duggan was the state president of the Shop Assistants Union and also president of the Toowoomba branch of the ALP at just 21 years of age. Three years later, he won the seat of Toowoomba for the Labor Party in the 1935 by-election to replace the sitting member, Evan Llewelyn. He went on to represent Toowoomba for the next 22 years.

=== Government Minister ===
In 1947 Duggan was promoted to the Transport portfolio, a post he retained under Ned Hanlon and Vince Gair. From 1953 onward, he was also deputy premier. He lost his cabinet posts when Gair led almost half of his caucus, including the entire cabinet except for Duggan, out of the ALP and formed the Queensland Labor Party in 1957.

=== Party Leadership ===
Duggan succeeded Gair as state Labor leader. When Gair's government sought supply, Duggan led Labor to vote against the motion. The Coalition, led by Frank Nicklin, also voted against the motion and brought the government down.

At the ensuing election, Duggan led Labor to second place in the overall vote and 20 seats. However, since every ALP MP was opposed by a QLP challenger and vice versa, the Labor vote was hopelessly divided. The first past the post system denied the Labor forces the option of directing preferences to each other even if they'd wanted to. Taking advantage of the large number of three-cornered contests, Nicklin led the Coalition to a decisive victory, taking 42 seats against only 31 for the two Labor factio s combined. Duggan himself was defeated by Liberal Mervyn Anderson.

The Labor Party was eager to get Duggan back into the legislature. Despite having no connection with the electorate of Gregory in central Queensland, he contested a by-election for that seat. He was defeated by a local Country Party candidate, Sir Wallace Rae. In March 1958, Duggan's successor as state Labor leader, Les Wood, suddenly died. Duggan became the ALP candidate for Wood's seat of North Toowoomba; he won the seat comfortably to return to the legislature.

North Toowoomba was abolished before the next state election and Duggan followed most of his constituents into the new seat of Toowoomba West. He represented the electorate until 1969 when he retired from parliament.

Duggan served as opposition leader until 1966, a time filled with difficulty. He not only had to deal with the presence of the QLP, which merged into the Democratic Labor Party in 1962, but was faced with particularly strenuous infighting within what was left of the ALP's parliamentary representation. His position was made even more difficult with the reintroduction of preferential voting in 1963. As a result, the DLP not only siphoned off votes from the ALP, but directed its preferences to the Coalition. Thus, the Coalition won elections in 1963 and 1966 without serious difficulty.

Following the 1966 election Duggan supported Jack Houston's successful challenge to deputy leader Eric Lloyd. Three months later on 11 October 1966 Duggan abruptly resigned as leader due to a "taxation difficulty of some magnitude" with Houston replacing him.

Having left state politics, Duggan remained in public life. He was elected to the Toowoomba City Council and was Mayor of Toowoomba in 1981.

== Personal life ==
On Boxing Day, 1935 he married Beatrice Mary Dunne at St Patrick's Cathedral in Toowoomba and together had one son and one daughter.

Duggan died in June 1993 and his funeral was held at St Patrick's Cathedral and proceeded to the Drayton and Toowoomba Cemetery.

Political offices
Preceded by Tom Foley	Deputy Premier of Queensland; 1953–1957	Succeeded by Ted Walsh
Preceded by Jim Donald	Leader of the Opposition in Queensland; 1958–1966	Succeeded by Jack Houston
Parliament of Queensland
Preceded by Evan Llewelyn	Member for Toowoomba; 1935–1957	Succeeded by Mervyn Anderson
Preceded by Les Wood	Member for North Toowoomba; 1958–1960	Abolished
New seat	Member for Toowoomba West; 1960–1969	Succeeded by Ray Bousen
