= Trevor Watts (politician) =

Australian politician

Trevor Watts MP

Member of the Queensland Parliament for Toowoomba North
- Incumbent
- Assumed office 24 March 2012
- Preceded by: Kerry Shine

Personal details
- Born: 30 January 1968 (age 58) Essex, England, United Kingdom
- Party: Liberal National Party of Queensland
- Spouse: Susan Watts
- Children: 4
- Education: University of Southern Queensland

Trevor John Watts (born 30 January 1968) is an Australian Liberal National politician who is the member of the Legislative Assembly of Queensland for Toowoomba North, having defeated Kerry Shine at the 2012 state election.

Watts was born in Essex, England and was raised in and around London. At the age of 17, he moved to Hong Kong to play basketball for South China AA. He visited Queensland in 1988, to attend World Expo 88 in Brisbane, and decided to move there permanently.

Watts was elected to Queensland Parliament as the Member for Toowoomba North in 2012, and was re-elected in 2015 and 2017. He currently serves as a Member of the Economics and Governance Committee. Prior to that, Watts' Parliamentary service included being a member of the Legal Affairs and Community Safety Committee, Parliamentary Crime and Corruption Committee and the Ethics Committee, chair of the Parliamentary Crime and Corruption Committee, Chief Opposition Whip, Shadow Minister for Police and Counter Terrorism and Shadow Minister for Corrective Services.

At the 2024 Queensland Election Watts was delivered a fifth term with a 10.4% swing, almost double the 2020 result from his electorate.

Watts was appointed Assistant Minister to the Premier for Cabinet and South West Queensland after the 2024 State Election.

Parliament of Queensland
Preceded by Kerry Shine	Member for Toowoomba North; 2012–present	Incumbent
