= Graham Healy =

Australian politician

Member of the Queensland Legislative Assembly for Toowoomba North
- In office 19 September 1992 – 17 February 2001
- Preceded by: John Flynn
- Succeeded by: Kerry Shine

Personal details
- Born: Graham John Healy; 18 August 1956 (age 69) Toowoomba, Queensland, Australia
- Party: National Party
- Occupation: Radio broadcaster, Political commentator

Graham John Healy (born 18 August 1956) is a former Australian politician. He was the National Party member for Toowoomba North in the Legislative Assembly of Queensland from 1992 to 2001.

Healy was born in Toowoomba and was a radio broadcaster and political commentator before his election. Having been elected to parliament in 1992, he was Parliamentary Secretary to the Minister for Families, Youth and Community Care from February to June 1998. Following the Coalition's defeat at that year's election, he became Shadow Minister for Tourism, Sport and Racing, moving to Small Business in February 1999. Healy was defeated at the 2001 state election.

Parliament of Queensland
Preceded by John Flynn	Member for Toowoomba North; 1992–2001	Succeeded by Kerry Shine
