= John Flynn (Australian politician) =

Australian politician (1953–2024)

Member of the Queensland Legislative Assembly for Toowoomba North
- In office 2 December 1989 – 19 September 1992
- Preceded by: Sandy McPhie
- Succeeded by: Graham Healy

Personal details
- Born: John Gerard Flynn; 21 May 1953 Brisbane, Queensland, Australia
- Died: 27 February 2024 (aged 70) Algester, Queensland, Australia
- Party: Labor
- Spouse: Kelyn Anne Blanch (m.1975)
- Education: University of Queensland
- Occupation: General practitioner, Biochemistry tutor

John Gerard Flynn (21 May 1953 – 27 February 2024) was an Australian politician. He was a Member of the Queensland Legislative Assembly.

== Early life ==
John Flynn was born in Brisbane, the son of John Joseph Flynn, a postman, and Kathleen Josephine, née De Hayr. He attended convent school at Rosalie and then Marist Brothers College Rosalie, before studying at the University of Queensland from 1971 to 1982, receiving a Bachelor of Science (Hons, 1975) and a Bachelor of Medicine, Bachelor of Surgery (Hons). He married Kelyn Ann Blanch, a teacher, on 5 January 1975. From 1976 to 1977 he was a biochemistry tutor at the university, and from 1978 to 1982 a part-time analytical biochemist at Royal Brisbane Hospital. In 1983, he was appointed medical officer at the Royal Brisbane and Royal Children's Hospitals, before becoming a private general practitioner in Toowoomba in 1985.

== Politics ==
A member of the Labor Party and president of the Toowoomba North branch, he was elected to the Queensland Legislative Assembly in 1989 as the member for Toowoomba North. He was defeated in 1992.

== Death ==
John Flynn died at the age of 70 on 27 February 2024.

Parliament of Queensland
| Preceded by Sandy McPhie | Member for Toowoomba North; 1989–1992 | Succeeded by Graham Healy |
