= Sandy McPhie =

Australian politician

Sandy McPhie JP

Member of the Queensland Legislative Assembly for Toowoomba North
- In office 22 October 1983 – 2 December 1989
- Preceded by: John Lockwood
- Succeeded by: John Flynn

Personal details
- Born: Alexander Carpendale McPhie; 10 February 1929 Charleville, Queensland, Australia
- Died: 5 December 2015 (aged 86) Toowoomba, Queensland, Australia
- Party: National Party
- Spouse: Helen Michell (m.1964)
- Education: University of New England
- Occupation: Realtor, Air Traffic Control Officer, Royal Australian Air Force, Farmer

Alexander Carpendale "Sandy" McPhie (10 February 1929 – 5 December 2015) was an Australian politician. He was a National Party member of the Queensland Legislative Assembly from 1983 to 1989, representing the electorate of Toowoomba North.

== Early life ==
McPhie was born in Charleville to Hector Kitchener McPhie and Florence Nellie, née Shanasy. He attended North Toowoomba State School and Toowoomba Grammar School before studying at The King's School in Parramatta, where he was School Captain in 1947 He then received a Certificate of Agricultural Science from Queensland Agricultural College, and was later an external student with the University of New England.

After working in the family's stock and station company McPhie and Co, and for AML and F, he took up land near Chinchilla where he farmed sheep. In 1957, he crashed a Tiger Moth biplane and spent several years recovering. In 1962, he joined the Royal Australian Air Force as an air traffic control officer, eventually gaining the rank of wing commander, and being in charge of all air traffic control for the Australian Air Force, Navy and Army. He retired from the RAAF in 1981 and returned to his hometown of Toowoomba.

== Politics ==
In 1983 McPhie ran for the National Party and was elected to the Queensland Legislative Assembly as the member for Toowoomba North, serving two terms until his defeat in 1989.

== Later life ==
In 1989 he was appointed Ceann Cath of Clan MacFie. He died at Toowoomba on 5 December 2015.

Parliament of Queensland
Preceded by John Lockwood	Member for Toowoomba North; 1983–1989	Succeeded by John Flynn
