= Geoff Chinchen =

Australian politician

Geoff Chinchen MBE, DFC
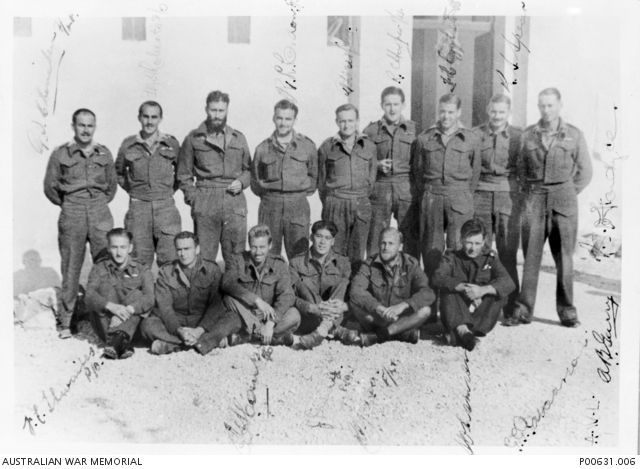
- Autographed group portrait of some Air Force prisoners of war at the POW Campo PG 78 - Geoff Chinchen is on the left - Back row

Member of the Queensland Legislative Assembly for Mount Gravatt
- In office 1 June 1963 – 12 November 1977
- Preceded by: Graham Hart
- Succeeded by: Guelfi Scassola

Personal details
- Born: Geoffrey Talbot Chinchen; 31 July 1915 Elsternwick, Victoria, Australia
- Died: 17 July 2005 (aged 89) Greenslopes, Queensland, Australia
- Party: Liberal Party
- Spouse: Heather Woolley (m.1946)
- Occupation: Queensland Manager, Ford Motor Company, Fruit farmer

Geoffrey Talbot Chinchen MBE DFC (31 July 1915 – 17 July 2005) was a member of the Queensland Legislative Assembly. He was also a member of the RAAF in World War II who escaped from a German Prisoner of War Camp.

== Early life ==
Chinchen was born at Elsternwick, a suburb of Melbourne in Victoria, the son of Cecil Talbot Chinchen, architect, and his wife Clementine Wilson (née Turnbull). He was educated at the Melbourne and Geelong Technical Colleges and then studied accountancy. He then worked for the Ford Motor Company as a salesman in Geelong.

== World War II ==
In 1940 Chinchen joined the RAAF where he became a pilot trainer with the Empire Trainer Scheme and was based at both Wagga Wagga and Camden. He was posted to the Middle East as a fighter pilot with the No 3 Squadron and before long he was Squadron Leader. He was shot down and wounded in January 1942 but was back with his squadron two months later.

In June 1942 he was once again shot down, this time by enemy ground fire and was captured by Germans of the Afrika Corps. He was taken prisoner and placed in the custody of a German Meteorological Officer because everybody else was busy fighting the battle. Before long Chinchen met Field Marshal Rommel who, on hearing they had a captured Australian Pilot, asked to meet him. Chinchen recalls of the meeting, He was a very pleasant gentleman, and he asked me a lot of questions but, of course, I couldn't tell him anything. He then said: "For you the war is over", to which I replied: "I don't know about that", and he laughed. I saw him several times afterwards and on each occasion he spoke to me for a few minutes.

After a while he was sent back to an Italian POW camp in Tripoli which was a far cry from the German Officers who had held him. From there he was moved to Bari then Sulmona where he was imprisoned for over a year. Here he met other officers from the No 3 Squadron who had also been shot down. He was also involved in a tunneling project to try and escape but it was not finished when Chinchen was moved from the camp to Bologna where it was soon learned that Italy was to about to sign an armistice with the allies and the guards had indicated that the prisoners would be freed. King Umberto signed the armistice on 10 September 1943 but the Germans took over the camp the day before.

On 11 September, the prisoners were given one hours notice to prepare to be moved again, this time into Germany. They were taken on to Stalag VII A at Moosburg then to Fort Bismarck, near Strasbourg. It was here that Chinchen made his escape to Switzerland, finally getting back to Australia in 1946. Chinchen was awarded the Distinguished Flying Cross in September 1942 and it was presented to him at Buckingham Palace by King George VI in 1944. In 1945 he was awarded the Order of the British Empire (MBE) for "showing exceptional courage in escaping from a German POW Camp".

== Public life ==
Chinchen joined the Liberal Party and became president of the Rochedale branch. In 1963 he won the seat of Mount Gravatt in the Queensland Legislative Assembly following the resignation of Graham Hart who been appointed a Judge of the Supreme Court. He quickly became a member of the Ginger Group that, that, over a period of years, was not afraid to voice its disapproval of government policies or even to vote against them.

He was in parliament for 14 years and retired from politics at the 1977 state elections. Although never a minister, he was a member of several parliamentary committees:

- Member of the Parliamentary Refreshment Room Committee 1963-1964
- Member of the Parliamentary Library Committee 1965-1974
- Member of the Parliamentary delegation to Japan and South-East Asia 1972
- Delegate to the Australasian Regional Conference of the Commonwealth Parliamentary Association 1975
- Member of the Select Committee on Subordinate Legislation 1975-1976
- Delegate to the General Conference of the Commonwealth Parliamentary Association in Mauritius 1976

== Later life ==
Chinchen married Heather Woolley on 23 December 1946, not long after arriving back in Australia. The marriage lasted 69 years until his death and it produced one son and two daughters.

He resumed work with the Ford Motor Company and in 1952 was made the Queensland manager of the company. He resigned four years later and bought a 20-acre property at Rochedale where he farmed potatoes, pawpaws and bananas. He retired to the Tricare retirement village at Mt Gravatt.

Chinchen died in July 2005 and his funeral proceeded from the Church of St Mary the Virgin at Kangaroo Point to the Mt Thompson Crematorium.

Parliament of Queensland
Preceded by Graham Hart	Member for Mount Gravatt; 1963–1977	Succeeded by Guelfi Scassola
