= Ian Henderson (politician) =

Australian politician

Ian Henderson JP

Member of the Queensland Legislative Assembly for Mount Gravatt
- In office 22 October 1983 – 2 December 1989
- Preceded by: Guelfi Scassola
- Succeeded by: Judy Spence

Personal details
- Born: Ian Thomas Henderson; 24 October 1940 (age 85) Brisbane, Queensland, Australia
- Party: National Party
- Education: University of Queensland, University of New England
- Occupation: School teacher

Ian Thomas Henderson (born 24 October 1940) is an Australian former politician.

He was born in Brisbane to Walter Henderson and Lilian Florence May, née Kennedy. He attended state schools at Tin Can Bay, Mooloolaba and Mount Gravatt and then Cavendish Road State High School. He studied at Kelvin Grove Teachers College (Certificate of Teaching), at the University of Queensland (BA, B.Ed, M.Ed.St) and at the University of New England (Litt.B); he also received an Associate Diplomat of Theology from the Australian College of Theology in Melbourne and a Doctorate of Religious Education at the International Bible Institute in Plymouth, Florida. A school teacher from 1962, he became subject master at Mount Gravatt High School in 1977 and deputy principal of Indooroopilly and Springwood high schools from 1980 to 1984. A member of the National Party, he was elected to the Queensland Legislative Assembly as the member for Mount Gravatt in 1983. He was promoted to the front bench as Minister for Justice and Corrective Services in October 1989, but he lost his seat in the election in December at which Labor defeated the National Party.

Parliament of Queensland
Preceded by Guelfi Scassola	Member for Mount Gravatt; 1983–1989	Succeeded by Judy Spence
