= Judy Spence =

Australian politician (born 1957)

The Honourable Judy Spence

Leader of the House of Queensland
- In office 7 April 2009 – 24 March 2012
- Premier: Anna Bligh
- Preceded by: Robert Schwarten
- Succeeded by: Ray Stevens

Minister for Police and Corrective Services of Queensland
- In office 12 February 2004 – 26 March 2009
- Premier: Peter Beattie (2004-2007) Anna Bligh (2007-2009)
- Preceded by: Tony McGrady
- Succeeded by: Neil Roberts

Minister for Seniors of Queensland
- In office 20 June 2002 – 12 February 2004
- Premier: Peter Beattie
- Preceded by: New office
- Succeeded by: Warren Pitt

Minister for Families and Disability Services of Queensland
- In office 22 February 2001 – 12 February 2004
- Premier: Peter Beattie
- Preceded by: Anna Bligh
- Succeeded by: Warren Pitt as Minister for Communities, Disability Services and Seniors

Minister for Aboriginal and Torres Strait Islander Partnerships of Queensland
- In office 29 June 1998 – 12 February 2004
- Premier: Peter Beattie
- Preceded by: New office
- Succeeded by: Liddy Clark

Minister for Women and Fair Trading of Queensland
- In office 29 June 1998 – 22 February 2001
- Premier: Peter Beattie
- Preceded by: New office
- Succeeded by: Wendy Edmond as Minister assisting the Premier on Women's Policy; Merri Rose as Minister for Fair Trading

Member of the Queensland Legislative Assembly for Sunnybank Mount Gravatt (1989–2009)
- In office 2 December 1989 – 24 March 2012
- Preceded by: Ian Henderson
- Succeeded by: Mark Stewart

Personal details
- Born: 19 May 1957 (age 68) Brisbane, Queensland, Australia
- Party: Labor
- Spouse: Heinz Jurgen Emk Peter Beierer
- Children: 1 son
- Occupation: Teacher

Judith Caroline Spence (born 19 May 1957) is an Australian politician and former member of the Legislative Assembly of Queensland for the Labor Party, from the 1989 election to 2012. She represented Mount Gravatt until 2009, but after a redistribution she switched to Sunnybank, which covered much of the same territory. She was Leader of the House, a role responsible for the co-ordination and management of Government business in the Assembly from 7 April 2009 to 24 March 2012.

== Early life ==
Spence was born in Brisbane on 19 May 1957 and obtained a Bachelor of Arts and Diploma of Teaching before becoming a secondary school teacher.

== Political career ==
Spence was elected to Parliament at the 1989 election on 2 December 1989, defeating National MP Ian Henderson and becoming the first Labor member for the seat in 32 years. She was a member of various committees and, upon the defeat of the Goss government as a result of the Mundingburra by-election, became Shadow Minister for Consumer Affairs and Women in the Beattie shadow cabinet in February 1996, adding Aboriginal and Islander Affairs to her shadow responsibilities in December 1996.

After the 1998 state election, where Labor won minority government, she became Minister for Women's Policy, Aboriginal and Islander Affairs and Fair Trading in the Beattie Ministry. In 2000, she resigned from the Left faction of the Labor Party and joined the dominant Labor Unity faction. At the 2001 state election, she retained Aboriginal and Islander Affairs but otherwise moved to Families and Disability Services. In 2004 she was promoted to Minister for Police and Corrective Services, in which she served until the 2009 election. She was demoted to Parliamentary Secretary assisting the Premier and Minister for Arts at this time by Premier Anna Bligh, attributed by some analysts to the settling of a dispute arising from her earlier factional switch, but she was appointed to the senior position of Leader of the House the following day.

Spence stood down from Parliament at the 2012 election.

== Personal life ==
She is a member of Amnesty International and several schools' Parents & Citizens committees.

== Notes ==
Political offices
Preceded by Robert Schwarten	Leader of the House of the Legislative Assembly of Queensland; 2009-2012	Succeeded by Ray Stevens
Parliament of Queensland
Preceded by Ian Henderson	Member for Mount Gravatt; 1989–2009	Abolished
New seat	Member for Sunnybank; 2009–2012	Succeeded by Mark Stewart
