= Felix Dittmer =

Australian politician

Dr Felix Dittmer
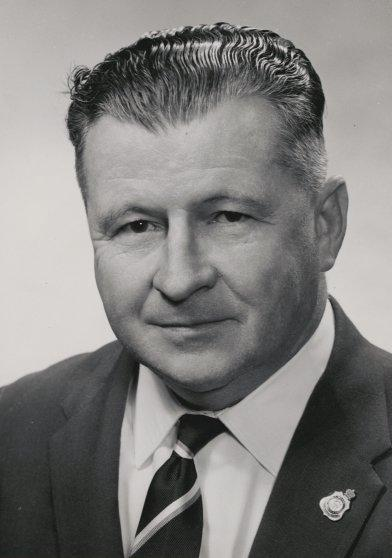

Senator for Queensland
- In office 1 July 1959 – 30 June 1971
- Preceded by: Condon Byrne
- Succeeded by: Ron McAuliffe

Member of the Queensland Legislative Assembly for Mount Gravatt
- In office 29 April 1950 – 3 August 1957
- Preceded by: Seat Established
- Succeeded by: Graham Hart

Personal details
- Born: 27 June 1904 Dugandan, Queensland
- Died: 29 August 1977 (aged 73) Brisbane, Queensland
- Resting place: Mt Gravatt Cemetery
- Party: Labor
- Spouse: Minnie Elizabeth Crow
- Education: University of Queensland; University of Sydney
- Occupation: Doctor

Felix Cyril Sigismund Dittmer (27 June 1904 – 29 August 1977) was an Australian politician.

== Early life ==
Felix Cyril Sigismund Dittmer was born on 27 June 1904 in Dugandan, Queensland, the son of Gustav Dittmer and his wife Marie Farris (née Massie). His father was a chemist born in Germany.

His primary schooling was at St Mary's Convent School in Bowen and Childers State School. He attended Childers State High School, where he achieved the highest results of any student being dux and winning prizes in all his subjects. He completed his secondary schooling at St Joseph's College, Nudgee in Brisbane. He was the first student from the Isis district to be awarded a university scholarship. Later he studied at the University of Queensland and the University of Sydney, becoming a doctor. He was an honorary surgeon in Brisbane.

Dittmer practised in Proserpine (1932–1940) and Brisbane (1940–1943), becoming an ear, nose and throat specialist. He enlisted in the Australian Military Forces in August 1943 and served with the Australian Army Medical Corps until February 1946, when he moved to the Army Reserve. While living in North Queensland, Dittmer bought a gold mine in the Whitsunday Region. He established Dittmer Gold Mines Limited and the town of Dittmer grew up around the mine; the company was liquidated in 1952.

== Politics ==
Dittmer was president of the Graceville branch of the ALP. He first stood for parliament at a 1943 Queensland Legislative Assembly by-election in the seat of Oxley. He also stood at the 1944 state election. In 1950, Dittmer was elected to the Legislative Assembly as the Labor member for Mount Gravatt; he briefly served as state deputy Labor leader in 1957. He lost his seat in the 1957 state election, but in 1958, he was elected to the Australian Senate as a Labor Senator for Queensland. He remained in the Senate until his retirement in 1970, taking effect in 1971.

== Later life ==
Dittmer died in 1977 and is buried in Mount Gravatt Cemetery.

Parliament of Queensland
New seat	Member for Mount Gravatt; 1950–1957	Succeeded by Graham Hart
