= Kerry Shine =

Australian politician

Councillor Kerry Shine
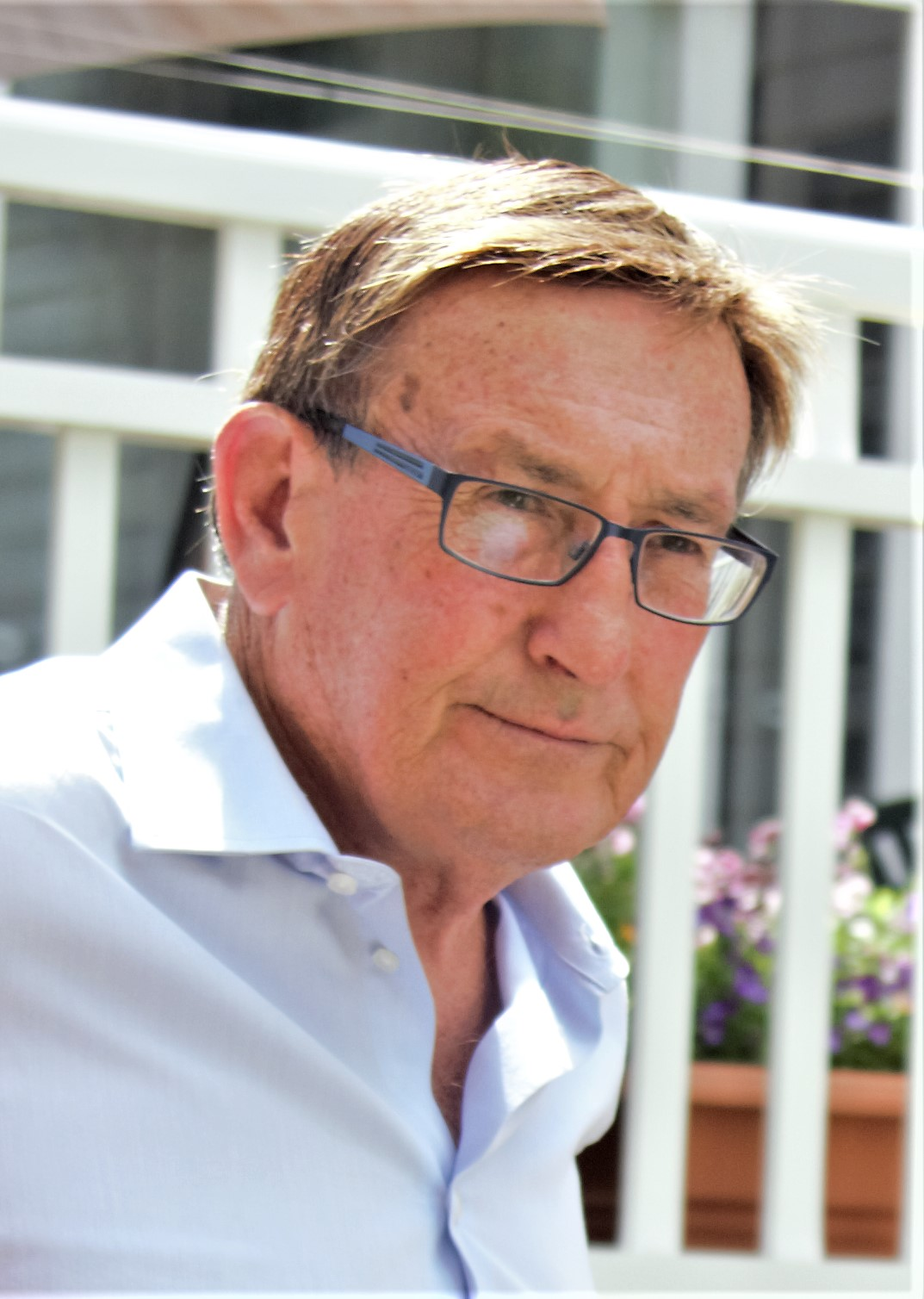

Councillor for Toowoomba Region
- Incumbent
- Assumed office 28 March 2020
- Mayor: Paul Antonio; Geoff McDonald

Attorney-General of Queensland and Minister for Justice
- In office 1 November 2006 – 26 March 2009
- Premier: Peter Beattie; Anna Bligh
- Preceded by: Linda Lavarch
- Succeeded by: Cameron Dick

Minister for Natural Resources and Minister for Water of Queensland
- In office 13 September 2006 – 1 November 2006
- Premier: Peter Beattie
- Preceded by: Henry Palaszczuk
- Succeeded by: Craig Wallace

Member of the Queensland Legislative Assembly for Toowoomba North
- In office 17 February 2001 – 24 March 2012
- Preceded by: Graham Healy
- Succeeded by: Trevor Watts

Personal details
- Born: Kerry Gerard Shine; 5 October 1948 (age 78) Toowoomba, Queensland, Australia
- Party: Labor
- Children: 3
- Education: University of Queensland
- Occupation: Solicitor

Kerry Gerard Shine (born 5 October 1948) is an Australian Labor politician who was member of the Legislative Assembly of Queensland for Toowoomba North from 2001 to 2012 and served as Attorney-General of Queensland from 2006 to 2009. He was elected as a member of Toowoomba Regional Council in March 2020.

== Career prior to politics ==
Prior to his election to Parliament, Shine was admitted as a solicitor in 1972 and, in June 1977, founded Shine Lawyers, a litigation firm that has grown into a nationwide company with over 40 offices providing personalised legal assistance to tens of thousands of Australians. In 1999 he co-founded Gouldson Legal (then known as Shine Gouldson Lawyers) alongside Faran Gouldson. Gouldson Legal is a plaintiff personal injury litigation firm specialising in Queensland personal injury compensation claims.

== Political life ==
Shine first ran for election in the seat of Toowoomba North in the 1998 state election. Shine was first elected in the landslide 2001 state election that saw the re-election of Peter Beattie as Premier of Queensland, and Shine retained his seat in 2004.

In July 2005 as part of a ministerial reshuffle, Shine was appointed Parliamentary Secretary to Warren Pitt (the Minister for Communities, Disability Services and Seniors) and Premier's Advisor on Western Queensland. On 1 November 2006, Shine was appointed as Queensland's Attorney-General and Minister for Justice.

Shine was sworn in as Minister for Natural Resources and Water in September 2006 and subsequently became the Attorney-General and Minister for Justice and Minister Assisting the Premier in Western Queensland in November 2006.

While Attorney-General, Shine oversaw many legislative reforms including a massive review of the Queensland Criminal Code, a review into the defence of Accident and Provocation and a review into the Queensland Courts. Shine was responsible for the establishment of the new Queensland Civil and Administrative Tribunal, (QCAT) and for the introduction of reform for the benefit of victims of crime.

The 2009 state election saw Shine retain the seat of Toowoomba North with a reduced margin against Liberal National challenger Trevor Watts. He subsequently returned to the backbench, out of a desire to spend more time in the electorate.

Shine was the chair of the new Industry, Education, Training and Industrial Relations Committee and a member of several Ministerial Legislative Committees including: the Attorney-General and Minister for Industrial Relations, Police, Corrective and Emergency Services, Transport and Main Roads, and Infrastructure and Planning.

In 2008 Kerry Shine became under fire for his comments about judges who gave lenient sentences in regards to rape. Mr Shine was interviewed on ABC Radio in Brisbane about figures on the rate at which rapists were jailed. Figures for 2007–08 showed one in eight people sentenced for rape or attempted rape avoided jail. "You have to look at the various circumstance of each case - some rapes can be of minor effect on the victim ... some circumstances can be of minor, some can be of major, damage to the victim," Mr Shine said. Mr Shine later called the station back to apologise after talkback callers expressed their outrage.

At the 2012 election, Shine faced Watts again and was heavily defeated in the massive landslide that brought the LNP to power, suffering a swing of almost 13 percent. He contested it in the 2015 election, but, despite his party winning a minority government, Shine narrowly lost to Watts.

Shine had another rewatch with Watts at the 2017 election and despite Shine's party gaining majority government he again lost to Watts this time with Watts gaining an increased majority.

In 2020 Shine was elected to the Toowoomba Regional Council.

== Community involvement ==
Shine is a Member of the Downs and South West Law Association, a Life Member of Queensland Law Society and a member of the Toowoomba Chamber of Commerce. He has previously served on the Council of the University of Southern Queensland and as a member of Toowoomba City Council.

Sporting associations include previous service as Secretary of the Rangers Rugby Union Football Club, Honorary Solicitor of the Queensland Country Cricket Association, President of the Toowoomba Cricket Association, Honorary Solicitor of the Darling Downs Rugby Union Club and membership of the Toowoomba Turf Club and Brisbane Racing Club. He is a member of the Australian Services Union.

== Personal life ==
Shine has three adult children.

== See also ==
- Members of the Queensland Legislative Assembly, 2004-2006; 2006-2009; 2009-2012
- Toowoomba (The seat of Toowoomba North lies in the city's northern suburbs and urban fringe.)

Parliament of Queensland
Preceded by Graham Healy	Member for Toowoomba North; 2001–2012	Succeeded by Trevor Watts
