= Graham Hart =

Australian politician and judge

Graham Hart QC

Member of the Queensland Legislative Assembly for Mount Gravatt
- In office 3 August 1957 – 24 January 1963
- Preceded by: Felix Dittmer
- Succeeded by: Geoff Chinchen

Personal details
- Born: Graham Lloyd Hart; 6 January 1906 Brisbane, Queensland, Australia
- Died: 18 April 1974 (aged 68) Brisbane, Queensland, Australia
- Party: Liberal Party
- Spouse: Helen Constance Bryant
- Occupation: Judge, Army officer

Graham Lloyd Hart (6 January 1906 – 18 April 1974) was an Australian politician, and judge of the Supreme Court of Queensland from 1963 to his death in 1974. He was the Liberal member for Mount Gravatt in the Legislative Assembly of Queensland from 1957 to 1963.

Parliament of Queensland
Preceded by Felix Dittmer	Member for Mount Gravatt; 1957-1963	Succeeded by Geoff Chinchen
