= Ray Bousen =

Australian politician

Member of the Queensland Legislative Assembly for Toowoomba West
- In office 17 May 1969 – 27 May 1972
- Preceded by: Jack Duggan
- Succeeded by: Seat abolished

Member of the Queensland Legislative Assembly for Toowoomba North
- In office 27 May 1972 – 7 December 1974
- Preceded by: New seat
- Succeeded by: John Lockwood

Personal details
- Born: William Raymond James Bousen; 13 January 1911 Toowoomba, Queensland, Australia
- Died: 28 May 2002 (aged 91) Coolum, Queensland, Australia
- Party: Labor
- Spouse: Doris Evelyn Hooper (m.1933)
- Occupation: Railway employee

William Raymond James Bousen (13 January 1911 – 28 May 2002) was a member of the Queensland Legislative Assembly.

== Biography ==
Bousen was born in Toowoomba, Queensland, the son of Sydney Herbert Bousen and his wife Annie Louisa (née Stayte). He was educated at Toowoomba North State School before attending the Toowoomba Technical College. He worked for the Queensland Railways all his life in a variety of jobs.

On 29 April 1933 he married Doris Evelyn Hooper and together had two daughters. He died at Coolum in May 2002.

== Public life ==
Bousen, representing the Labor, was the member for Toowoomba West in the Queensland Legislative Assembly from 1969 until 1972. Toowoomba West was abolished and from 1972 until his defeat in 1974 he represented Toowoomba North.

Parliament of Queensland
Preceded by Jack Duggan	Member for Toowoomba West; 1969–1972	Abolished
New seat	Member for Toowoomba North; 1972–1974	Succeeded by John Lockwood
