= Peter Wood (Australian politician) =

Australian politician (1935–2010)

Peter Wood OAM

Member of the Queensland Legislative Assembly for Toowoomba East
- In office 28 May 1966 – 27 May 1972
- Preceded by: Mervyn Anderson
- Succeeded by: Seat abolished

Member of the Queensland Legislative Assembly for Toowoomba South
- In office 27 May 1972 – 7 December 1974
- Preceded by: New seat
- Succeeded by: John Warner

Personal details
- Born: 4 November 1935 Toowoomba, Queensland, Australia
- Died: 24 January 2010 (aged 74) Toowoomba, Queensland, Australia
- Party: Labor
- Spouse: Robin Hadorn
- Relations: Les Wood (father), Bill Wood (twin brother)
- Occupation: Teacher

Peter Wood OAM (4 November 1935 – 24 January 2010) was an Australian politician.

Wood and his identical twin brother Bill were the sons of Les Wood, also a Labor politician. Peter was elected to the Legislative Assembly of Queensland in 1966, representing Toowoomba East; he moved to Toowoomba South in 1972 but was defeated in 1974.

Following his defeat Wood spent 22 years on Toowoomba City Council, serving as deputy mayor for 12 of those. He moved to Noosa in 2007 and died from cancer in 2010.

Parliament of Queensland
Preceded by Mervyn Anderson	Member for Toowoomba East; 1966–1972	Abolished
New seat	Member for Toowoomba South; 1972–1974	Succeeded by John Warner
