= Electoral district of Toowoomba North =

State electoral district of Queensland, Australia

Toowoomba North Queensland—Legislative Assembly
- Electoral map of Toowoomba North 2017
- State: Queensland
- MP: Trevor Watts
- Party: Liberal National
- Namesake: Toowoomba
- Electors: 37,423 (2020)
- Area: 111 km^{2} (42.9 sq mi)
- Demographic: Provincial
- Coordinates: 27°30′S 151°58′E
Electorates around Toowoomba North:
| Condamine | Condamine | Lockyer |
| Condamine | Toowoomba North | Lockyer |
| Condamine | Toowoomba South | Lockyer |

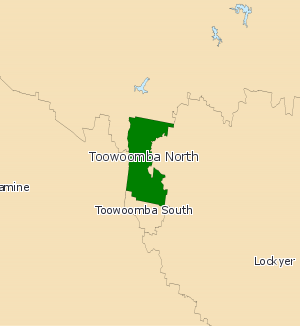
Electoral map of Toowoomba North 2008

Toowoomba North is an electoral district of the Legislative Assembly in the Australian state of Queensland. It was created with the 1972 redistribution. It replaced the abolished electorate of Toowoomba West. Toowoomba North is largely based around the upper half of the city of Toowoomba.

It covers the suburbs north of James Street, including Newtown, Wilsonton, Mount Lofty, etc. It also includes the urban fringe area of Blue Mountain Heights, the satellite town of Highfields and Spring Bluff. It excludes certain western localities of Toowoomba, which are in the Electoral district of Condamine.

The electorate is currently represented by Trevor Watts of the Liberal National Party of Queensland.

== Members for Toowoomba North ==
| Member | Party | Term |
|---|---|---|
| Ray Bousen | Labor | 1972–1974 |
| John Lockwood | Liberal | 1974–1983 |
| Sandy McPhie | National | 1983–1989 |
| John Flynn | Labor | 1989–1992 |
| Graham Healy | National | 1992–2001 |
| Kerry Shine | Labor | 2001–2012 |
| Trevor Watts | Liberal National | 2012–present |

== Election results ==
2024 Queensland state election: Toowoomba North
| Party | Candidate | Votes | % | ±% |
|---|---|---|---|---|
| Liberal National | Trevor Watts | 19,909 | 57.10 | +7.11 |
| Labor | James Green | 8,468 | 24.29 | −10.75 |
| Greens | Thom Roker | 2,595 | 7.44 | +0.99 |
| One Nation | Sebastian Lund | 2,457 | 7.05 | −0.33 |
| Family First | Kerri Hislop | 1,436 | 4.12 | +4.12 |
| Total formal votes | | 34,865 | 96.92 | −0.6 |
| Informal votes | | 1,109 | 3.08 | +0.6 |
| Turnout | | 35,974 | 88.96 | +0.63 |
Two-party-preferred result
| Liberal National | Trevor Watts | 23,193 | 66.52 | +9.20 |
| Labor | James Green | 11,672 | 33.48 | −9.20 |
| Liberal National hold | | Swing | +9.20 | |

Primary vote results in Toowoomba North (Parties that have never gotten 5% of the vote are omitted)
Liberal National

Country/National
Liberal

Labor
One Nation
Greens
Katter's Australian
City Country Alliance
Palmer United/United Australia Party
Australian Democrats
Queensland Labor
Independent
View source data.
Two-party-preferred vote vote results in Toowoomba North View source data.
