= Electoral district of Toowoomba West =

Coordinates: 27°33′53.75″S 151°55′06″E

Toowoomba West Queensland—Legislative Assembly
- State: Queensland
- Created: 1960
- Abolished: 1972
- Namesake: Toowoomba

Toowoomba West was an electoral district of the Legislative Assembly in the Australian state of Queensland. It was created with the 1960 redistribution and removed by the 1972 redistribution.

The seat was based in the City of Toowoomba.

The member for North Toowoomba, Jack Duggan successfully stood for election in Toowoomba West in 1960 after his previous seat was lost in the redistribution.

The sitting member, Ray Bousen, successfully stood for election in the new seat of Toowoomba North in the 1972 election.

== Members for Toowoomba West ==
Member	Party	Term
Jack Duggan	Labor	1960–1969
Ray Bousen	Labor	1969–1972

== See also ==
- Historical Seats of Toowoomba
- Electoral districts of Queensland
- Members of the Queensland Legislative Assembly by year
- Category:Members of the Queensland Legislative Assembly by name
