= Electoral district of Mount Gravatt =

Former state electoral district of Queensland, Australia

Mount Gravatt Queensland—Legislative Assembly
- State: Queensland
- Dates current: 1950–2009
- Namesake: Mount Gravatt

Mount Gravatt was an electoral district of the Legislative Assembly in the Australian state of Queensland from 1950 to 2009.

The district was based in the southern suburbs of Brisbane. Prior to its abolition, it included the suburbs of Mount Gravatt, Mount Gravatt East, Eight Mile Plains, Robertson and Sunnybank.

In 2008, Mount Gravatt was abolished—with effect at the 2009 state election—as a result of the redistribution undertaken by the Electoral Commission of Queensland. Its former territory and voters were divided between the districts of Chatsworth, Greenslopes, Mansfield, Yeerongpilly and the new seat of Sunnybank.

== Members for Mount Gravatt ==
Member	Party	Term
Felix Dittmer	Labor	1950–1957
Graham Hart	Liberal	1957–1963
Geoff Chinchen	Liberal	1963–1977
Guelfi Scassola	Liberal	1977–1983
Ian Henderson	National	1983–1989
Judy Spence	Labor	1989–2009

== See also ==
- Electoral districts of Queensland
- Members of the Queensland Legislative Assembly by year
- Category:Members of the Queensland Legislative Assembly by name
