= Mervyn Anderson =

Australian politician

Mervyn Anderson OBE

Member of the Queensland Legislative Assembly for Toowoomba
- In office 3 August 1957 – 28 May 1960
- Preceded by: Jack Duggan
- Succeeded by: Seat abolished

Member of the Queensland Legislative Assembly for Toowoomba East
- In office 28 May 1960 – 28 May 1966
- Preceded by: first member
- Succeeded by: Peter Wood

Personal details
- Born: Mervyn John Reginald Anderson; 4 April 1909 Toowoomba, Queensland, Australia
- Died: 14 November 1971 (aged 62) Toowoomba, Queensland, Australia
- Resting place: Drayton and Toowoomba Cemetery
- Party: Liberal Party
- Spouse: Ethel Roberts Nairne (m.1935)
- Occupation: Transport industry

Mervyn John Reginald "Curly" Anderson (4 April 1909 – 14 November 1971) was a member of the Queensland Legislative Assembly.

== Biography ==
Anderson was born at Toowoomba, Queensland, the son of John Anderson and his wife Clara Jane (née Harrold). He was educated at Toowoomba State School and upon leaving he was a delivery boy for father's grocery store. He was next proprietor of a service station before being the managing director of Maranoa Transport Pty Ltd and chairman and director of Western Transport Pty Ltd.

On 17 January 1935 he married Ethel Roberts Nairne and together had two sons and one daughter. Anderson died suddenly at home in November 1971.

== Public life ==
Anderson started off in politics as a councilor on the Drayton Shire Council before becoming an alderman on the Toowoomba City Council including being Mayor of Toowoomba from 1952 to 1958.

He then entered state politics by beating the former Deputy Premier of Queensland and the then leader of the Australian Labor Party in Queensland, Jack Duggan at the 1957 Queensland state election by winning the seat of Toowoomba for the Liberal Party. The seat of Toowoomba was abolished before the 1960 Queensland state election and Anderson then won the seat of Toowoomba East, holding it till his retirement from politics in 1966.

Parliament of Queensland
Preceded by Jack Duggan	Member for Toowoomba; 1957–1960	Abolished
New seat	Member for Toowoomba East; 1960–1966	Succeeded by Peter Wood
