= Electoral district of Toowoomba East =

Coordinates: 27°34′13″S 151°58′21″E

Toowoomba East Queensland—Legislative Assembly
- State: Queensland
- Created: 1960
- Abolished: 1972
- Namesake: Toowoomba

The Electoral district of Toowoomba East was an electoral district of the Legislative Assembly in the Australian state of Queensland. It was created with the 1960 redistribution and removed by the 1972 redistribution.

The seat was based on the City of Toowoomba.

The member for Toowoomba, Mervyn Anderson successfully stood for election in Toowoomba East in 1960 after his previous seat was lost in the redistribution.

The sitting member, Peter Wood, successfully stood for election in the new seat of Toowoomba South in the 1972 election.

== Members for Toowoomba East ==
The members for Toowoomba East were:

Member	Party	Term
Mervyn Anderson	Liberal	1960–1966
Peter Wood	Labor	1966–1972

== See also ==
- Electoral districts of Queensland
- Members of the Queensland Legislative Assembly by year
- Category:Members of the Queensland Legislative Assembly by name
