= The Downs Co-operative Dairy Association Limited Factory =

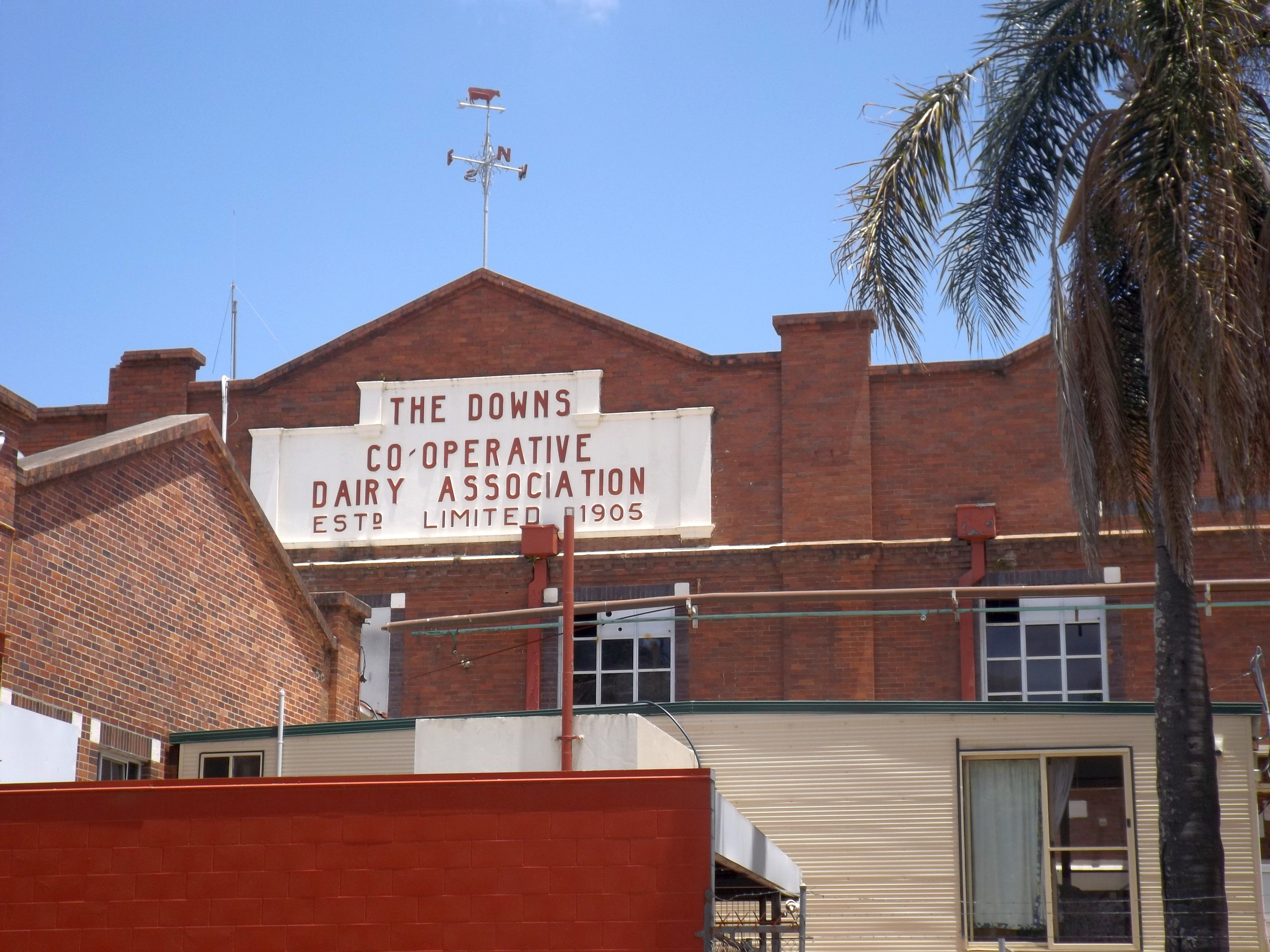
- Main building, 2014

- Location within Queensland Location within Australia
- 27.5476°S 151.9498°E
- Location: 57 Brook Street, North Toowoomba, Toowoomba, Toowoomba Region, Queensland, Australia

Queensland Heritage Register
- Official name: The Downs Co-operative Dairy Association Limited Factory (former), Dairy Farmers Factory
- Type: state heritage (built)
- Designated: 18 April 2008
- Reference no.: 602596
- Significant period: 1920s

The Downs Co-operative Dairy Association Limited Factory is a heritage-listed factory at 57 Brook Street, North Toowoomba, Toowoomba, Toowoomba Region, Queensland, Australia. It is also known as Dairy Farmers Factory. It was added to the Queensland Heritage Register on 18 April 2008.

== History ==
The former Downs Co-operative Dairy Association Limited Factory, located on Brook Street, Toowoomba, is associated closely with the development of the Queensland dairy industry and with the emergence of the Darling Downs as a principal dairy producing region during the early to mid-twentieth century. The original butter factory, made of timber, was constructed in 1905. This was rebuilt in 1929 in brick and concrete, and extended at a later date. As the importance of dairying to Queensland expanded during the 1930s and 1940s, additional structures were erected on the site, including an administration building (early 1930s), laboratory (1936), an engine and refrigeration building (c.1930s), generator, sub-station, and boiler room (all c.1930s), and a milk and cheese processing factory (late 1930s to early 1940s). Further additions, extensions and renovations were undertaken post-1940s.

By the 1890s the Queensland Government had identified the expansion of agriculture, especially dairying, as a key means of encouraging closer settlement and boosting the Queensland economy. The expansion of dairying as a commercial activity was made possible by a number of advances in technology in the late nineteenth century, including the availability of refrigerated shipping in Queensland from 1883; the introduction of mechanical cream separators to Queensland in the late 1880s (invented in Europe in 1878); and the development of the Babcock butterfat test. Queensland Government intervention to encourage commercial dairying took a variety of forms. In the late 1880s and early 1890s the Queensland Department of Agriculture established Travelling Dairies that toured Queensland via the railway network, demonstrating and promoting techniques and equipment to potential dairy farmers and butter and cheese producers. Government grading of butter was introduced, and a series of Meat and Dairy Produce Acts between 1893 and 1904 facilitated the establishment of co-operative butter and cheese factories. Between 1894 and 1919 land repurchased from pastoralists under the provisions of the 1894 Agricultural Lands Purchase Act was resurveyed as agricultural selections, and closer settlement legislation between 1906 and 1917 assisted in the creation of small agricultural service towns. Heavy government expenditure on railway construction in the first two decades of the twentieth century was a significant catalyst for the expansion of dairying, extending the Queensland railway network from 3,500 kilometres (2,200 mi) in 1890 to 6,300 kilometres (3,900 mi) by 1910 and to 9,300 kilometres (5,800 mi) by 1920. Between 1910 and 1920, most new railway construction was of branch lines for agriculture.

Between the 1910s and the 1960s, dairying made a significant contribution to the Queensland economy, not only with the direct sales of dairy products both domestically and internationally, but also because dairying encouraged closer settlement of the land and wide-scale crop production. During the economic depression of the 1930s dairying was the most widespread agricultural activity in Queensland, which became known as the "dairy state". Regular cream cheques kept many rural families on the land during these years. Between 1936 and 1941, dairying was Queensland's second most profitable export industry.

The co-operative movement, in which producers held shares in enterprises that processed and sold their product, evolved in Switzerland during the 1880s, and was transferred from Victoria to Queensland by dairy immigrants during the 1890s and the first decade of the twentieth century. In 1901 an initial attempt to form a Downs Dairy Co-operative was made by a handful of dairymen meeting at Wellcamp, but faltered due to lack of financial support. The proposal was resurrected in April 1904 at a meeting at Westbrook, at which it was resolved to establish a centrally located butter factory adjacent to the railway at or near Toowoomba. The committee formed to deliver the proposal determined in May 1904 that the company be formed solely of farmers or dairymen; that only new equipment be installed at the factory; and that the position of manager of the factory be advertised nationally. A prospectus offering shares at £1 each was adopted by June 1904 and received significant local support, on the strength of which a site adjoining the Southern and Western Railway at Brook Street in Toowoomba was acquired and tenders called for the construction of a butter factory. Construction commenced in 1905 and the single-storey timber structure incorporating butter factory and refrigeration room was opened by Hon. James Tolmie in November 1905, although manufacturing had commenced in the previous month.

The co-operative adopted the brand name "Unity" with an accompanying trade mark symbol: a bundle of sticks denoting collective strength. The factory was financial from the start, with turnover during the first year of £61,299. The Co-operative's success encouraged the formation of other dairy co-operatives and the consolidation of dairying as a principal economic activity on the Darling Downs. Following the opening of the Co-operative's Toowoomba factory in 1905 the Darling Downs dairy herd quadrupled in size from just over 20,000 head to almost 90,000, and grew to just under 220,000 by 1945. By the 1950s the Darling Downs produced over 25 pre cent of Queensland's dairy output.

The Downs Co-operative Dairy Association soon expanded, constructing or purchasing branch butter factories at Miles (1911), Clifton (1912), Dalby (1915) and Crows Nest (1918). World War I (1914–1918) stimulated cheese manufacturing in Queensland, prompting the Co-operative to establish or acquire branch cheese factories at Hodgson Vale (1915), Jondaryan (1919), Gowrie Junction (1920), Boodua (1926), Lilyvale (1926) and Wyreema (1927). However, the Toowoomba factory remained the Co-operative's flagship facility and administrative headquarters throughout the twentieth century.

In the late 1920s/early 1930s the Co-operative's success enabled it to re-build a number of its timber butter factories in concrete and brick – Dalby (1927), Toowoomba (1929), Clifton (1933) and Goombungee (1934) – but during the economic downturn of the early 1930s closed a number of its cheese factories.

In the reconstruction of the Toowoomba factory the wooden buildings were removed section by section and replaced in situ by new concrete and brick structures.

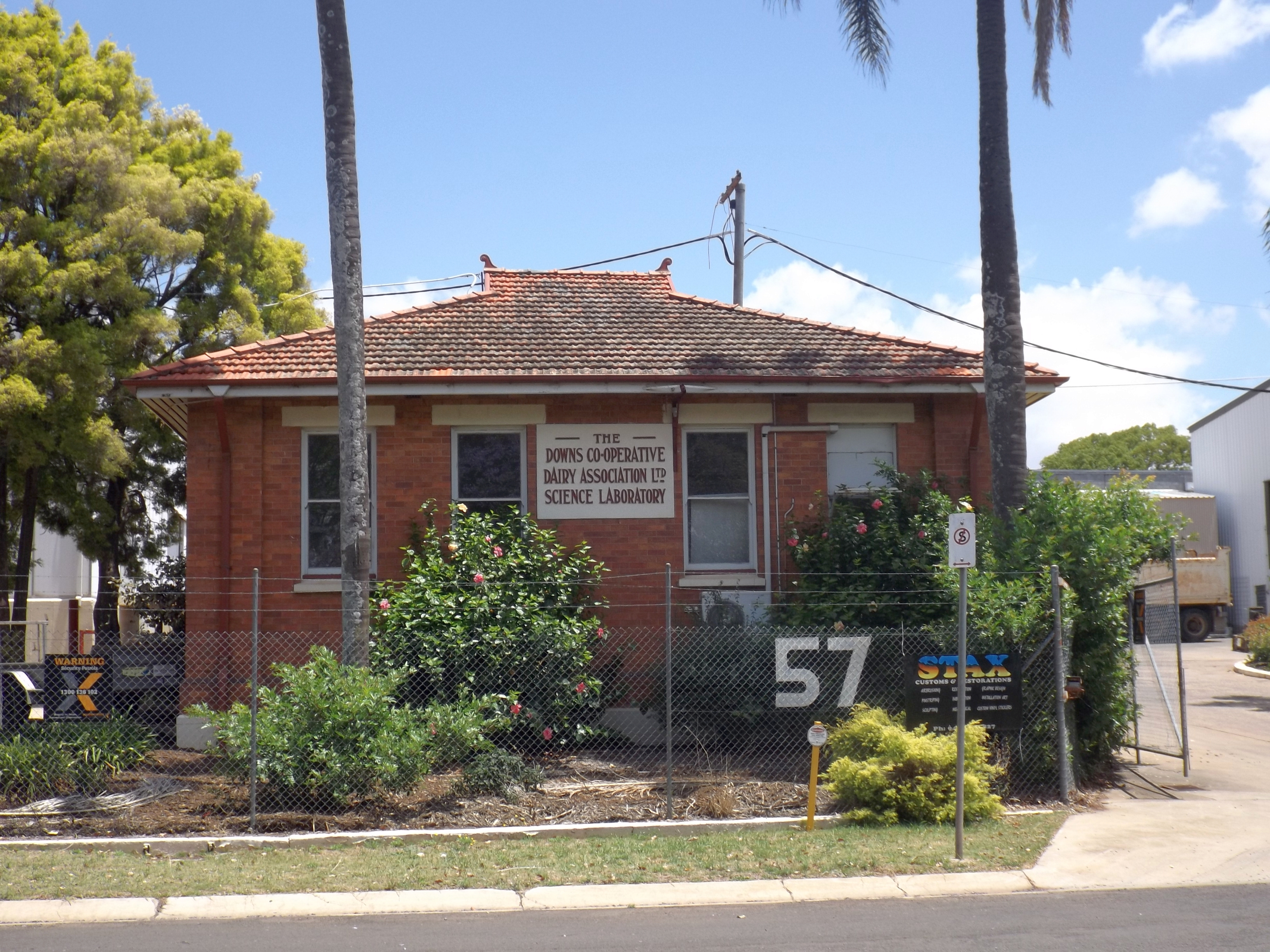
Science laboratory, 2014

To maintain the prestige and reputation of the Unity brand of products through quality control of all aspects of butter and later milk and cheese production, a laboratory (science building) was constructed at the Toowoomba factory in 1936. In 1938 the Co-operative gained exclusive right to the distribution of pasteurised milk in Toowoomba, and new facilities were constructed at the Toowoomba factory to handle milk pasteurising and bottling. In 1939 the Co-operative centralised its entire milk supply at Toowoomba, enabling more efficient cheese production, leading to unprecedented growth in the region and to further extensions to the Toowoomba factory, completed in 1940.

World War II (1939–1945) placed tremendous demands on Australian primary production and with the arrival of thousands of American troops in south-east Queensland the Darling Downs experienced marked growth in butter and cheese production and in demand for whole pasteurised milk. Milk production levels were sustained in the post-war years, with milk from the Toowoomba factory transported by rail as far west as Quilpie and Cunnamulla while new bulk road transports supplied the Brisbane market. The Co-operative continued to expand and in 1953 a new plant for the concentration and drying of milk products was opened.

The Downs Co-operative Dairy Association benefited from its close association with two prominent figures in the Australian dairy industry during the first half of the twentieth century: James Purcell and James Henry Cecil Roberts. Through these men the Co-operative influenced dairying policy at state and national levels.

Purcell was a leading figure in the Australian dairy industry, serving as chairman of the Commonwealth Dairy Produce Equalization Committee between 1934 and 1950. In 1904 he helped to form the Downs Co-operative Dairy Company (later Association) and remained a director until 1932. He was chairman of the Association in 1912–1917, 1918–1919 and 1920–1932. Purcell played a major role in the formulation of state, federal and empire/commonwealth dairying policies throughout the first half of the twentieth century.

Roberts was a director of the Downs Co-operative Dairy Association between 1932 and 1942 and chairman of directors for four years. He was prominent in Queensland's political and economic history, being an important anti-labor figure. He founded the Darling Downs Farmers Union in 1911 and was one of the refounders of the Queensland Country Party in 1936.

In the 1960s the Co-operative moved from butter-based production to cheese and milk-based products, including subsidiary products such as yoghurt and calf food, in anticipation of the loss of its principal overseas market when Britain would eventually join the European common market (1973). The loss of the British market forced a rationalisation of the Queensland dairying industry, reducing the dairy herd and large areas of the Darling Downs being converted from dairying to grain-growing. While the industry contracted and the smaller factories closed, the Downs Co-operative Dairy Association factory in Toowoomba remained viable and in 1985 a new milk powder factory was constructed on the site. Deregulation of the Queensland dairy industry between 1998 and 2003 ultimately resulted in a 2005 decision by the Co-operative to rationalise production, which effectively ended the future of the Toowoomba factory, which closed in 2006.

== Description ==
The Downs Co-Operative Dairy Association Ltd Factory is a complex of brick, concrete and metal buildings and other structures dating from 1929 through to the 1990s, located on a long, narrow, 1.4 hectare site squeezed between the western rail line and Brook Street, Toowoomba. The brick and concrete buildings on the site have been modified over time and internally retain much original fabric.

Structures of heritage significance on the site include:

=== Administration building (c. 1930 and extended at a later date) ===
The administration building is situated at the northern end of the site adjacent to Brook Street. It is a single-storey, face-brick building with rendered lintels above the double hung sash windows facing Brook Street. There is an extension to the building along the western side. The roofs of both the main structure and the extension are clad with corrugated iron. The front of the main building has the company name and date of establishment in relief on a rendered section of wall directly above the entrance.

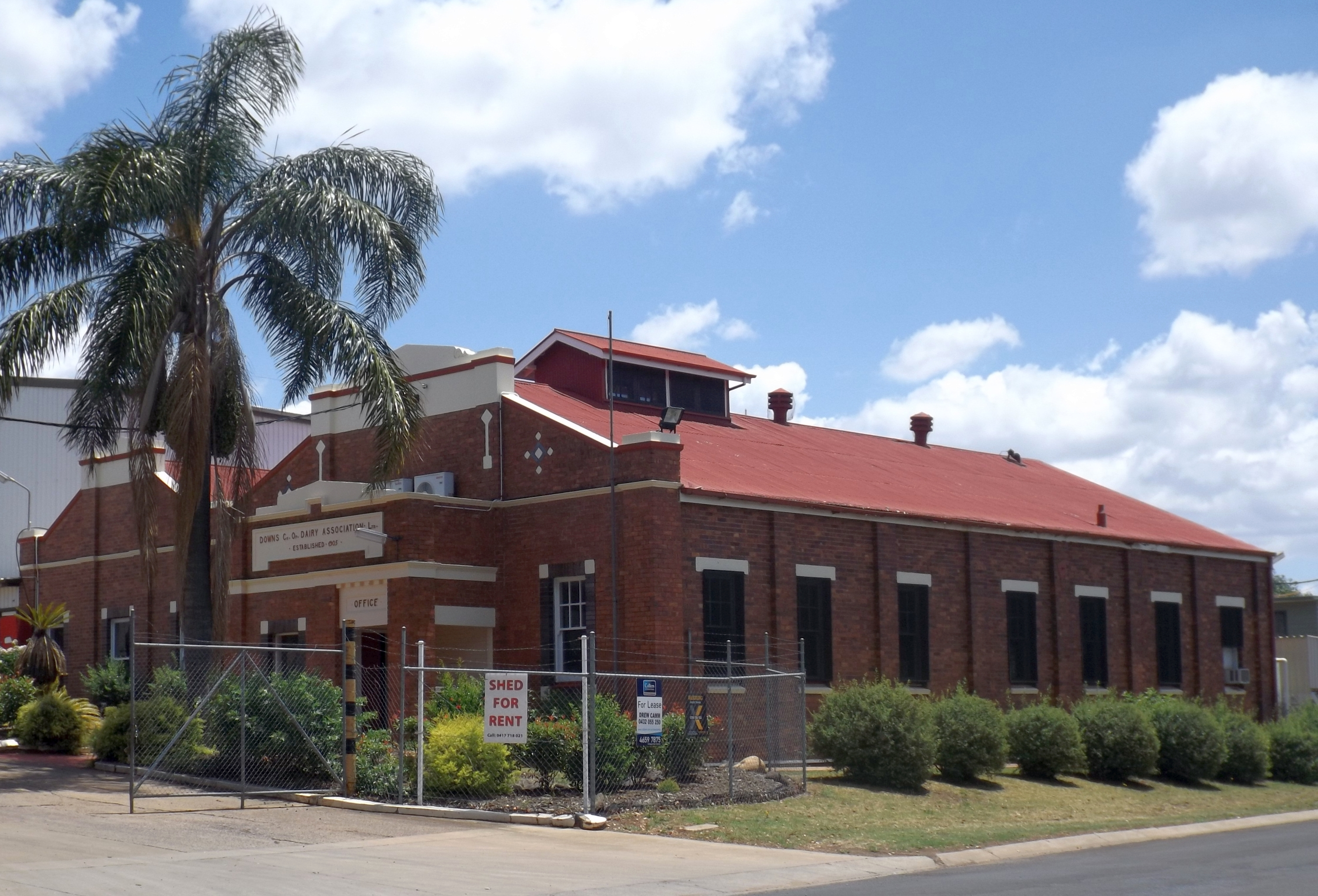
Office building, 2014

The interior of the building contains a standard office layout with offices for the senior staff, a boardroom, a clerks' room, filing rooms, toilets and a tearoom. Most of the interior fittings are early and in situ, except for a large wall cabinet that was moved in early 2008 from the boardroom to the Darling Downs Dairy Museum. Early fixtures and fittings in this building include Art Deco-style counters, two built-in safes and a skylight.

=== Laboratory (Science Building) (1936) ===
The laboratory is situated adjacent to the administration building, facing Brook Street. It is a single-storey, face-brick building with rendered window lintels and sills and a terracotta tiled hipped roof. It has double hung sash windows, the upper sashes being multi-paned. On the Brook Street side of the building is a square section of rendered wall with the raised lettering: The Downs Co-Operative Dairy Association Ltd Science Building.

The interior of the building is divided into five small rooms that retain many early fittings and fixtures, including fume cupboards, lab benches, sinks and other equipment. Early wall vents are in place. Ceilings are of fibrous plaster or cement sheeting with timber cover strips.

=== Engine and Refrigeration Building (c. 1930s) ===
Situated close to Brook Street, immediately east of the Butter Factory, is a two-storey, face-brick building with gabled roof and decorative parapet to Brook Street, which functioned as the Engine and Refrigeration Building.

Internally this building is partitioned into three sections: engine room; refrigeration room; and switching room. The engine room retains a large amount of equipment. The refrigeration room has two early ammonia compressors manufactured by O'Connell and Kerr of Melbourne, one modern refrigeration compressor, and the footings for two other modern compressors since removed. The switching room has modern banks of electrical equipment and older controls for the refrigeration plant although the older distribution panels have been removed. Tracks for a wall-mounted gantry crane remain in place along the eastern wall.

=== Butter Factory (1929) ===
Located immediately behind the engine room is the Butter Factory building, which includes a store and boiler room. The building is a three-storey, rectangular face-brick building. In the centre of the parapets along the eastern and western elevations is a large rendered section of wall with the name of the company and date established in lettering across the top. On the exterior of the factory is a plaque erected at the time of extensive renovations to the interior in 1985–1986.

The building, which was used principally for the production of butter, cream and cottage cheese, has a concrete floor and minimal internal partition walls. The butter maker and butter packaging equipment have been removed but the pipes and most of the cream vats for the butter maker remain in situ. The cottage cheese manufacturing plant is still in place located on a mezzanine. The former dry room, now used for storage, is located beneath this mezzanine. More modern cheese making equipment remains in place. Two large cream vats have been removed. The building also contains a store and a small production office.

A boiler house is located at the southern end of the Butter factory. This housed two steam boilers initially, but one has been removed. Footings for the removed boiler and chimneys indicate their former locations.

=== Milk and Cheese Factory (late 1930s to early 1940s) ===
This structure comprises three connected and adjoining three-storey, face-brick, buildings located in the centre of the complex facing Brook Street, that had been used for bulk milk processing (pasteurising) and cheese manufacture. This structure provides an imposing street frontage for the entire factory complex. Each of the buildings is square in plan. The centre building has "Unity" in raised lettering in the centre top of the front elevation. The southernmost building is lower than the centre building and has the raised lettering "Unity – Pasteurised Milk" along the top of the front elevation.

The building contains an evaporator room, store rooms, cheese manufacturing rooms, cheese drying rooms, a cheese elevator, pasteurisation room and a bottle room. Almost all the fixtures and fittings in this building were installed in the 1990s. However, the early Gouda and Edam cheese drying room located at the top of the building remains mostly intact, along with a timber cheese elevator for transporting the cheeses up and down and an early and highly decorative cast iron spiral staircase used to access this room from the pasteurisation room below.

=== Other structures ===
Other post-1940s buildings and structures occur across the site, including offices, silos, loading bays, storerooms and power infrastructure. Many date from the 1970s and 1980s. These are not considered to be of cultural heritage significance.

Externally, all the brick and concrete buildings from the 1920s to the 1940s are bound together with metal pipes, cable train, air conditioner ducting and other services that have been introduced into the different buildings. These services are not considered to be of cultural heritage significance.

== Heritage listing ==
The former Downs Co-operative Dairy Association Limited Factory was listed on the Queensland Heritage Register on 18 April 2008 having satisfied the following criteria.

The place is important in demonstrating the evolution or pattern of Queensland's history.

The Downs Co-operative Dairy Association Limited Factory (former) is significant in demonstrating an important aspect of the pattern of Queensland's history and is an example of a place which has made a strong contribution to the evolution of Queensland's society and environment.

The Downs Co-operative Dairy Association Limited Factory (former) demonstrates aspects of regional and economic development including the opening-up of land to closer settlement of the Darling Downs from 1900, the establishment of industry along rail networks, the rise of the dairy industry in southeast Queensland and its eventual decline in the late twentieth century. The site is able to demonstrate these significant aspects of Queensland's history through its location, fabric and scale.

The dairy industry made a strong contribution to Queensland's regional and economic development. The Downs Co-operative Dairy Association Limited Factory (former) has historic significance due to its association with the dairy industry of the Darling Downs from 1905 to 2006. The industry had a significant impact on people's lives in the region through the work of the Darling Downs Dairy Co-operative, through the co-operative's direct connections with the region's farmer suppliers and through the manufacture of products and brands important in people's daily lives (including cream and milk deliveries, school milk programs and the Unity brand).

The place is important in demonstrating the principal characteristics of a particular class of cultural places.

The Downs Co-operative Dairy Association Limited Factory (former) is important in demonstrating the principal characteristics of a dairy processing site. The Downs Co-operative Dairy Association Limited Factory (former) comprises a complex of buildings erected in several stages from 1929 to the 1990s to process dairy products. This collection of buildings and equipment is important in demonstrating the principal characteristics of dairy processing typical of dairy factories established from the early 1900s including its location adjacent to a railway line; and structures associated with the expansion of the 1930s and 1940s, a growing focus on road transport from 1940 and that reflect the continuing adaptation to new technology throughout the twentieth century.

The fabric of the Downs Co-operative Dairy Association Ltd Factory (former) clearly demonstrates the interconnected processes of milk, cheese and butter production in one complex and is evidence of changes that occurred in these processes for technological, economic or social reasons, throughout much of the twentieth century.

The place has a special association with the life or work of a particular person, group or organisation of importance in Queensland's history.

The Downs Co-operative Dairy Association Ltd Factory (former) has a special association with the work of the Downs Co-operative Dairy Association. The co-operative was one of the largest in Queensland and particularly productive, producing 25% of the state's overall dairy output by 1950. Through directors such as James Roberts and James Purcell, the co-operative's influence on the development of state and federal dairy production policies contributed to the success of dairying in Queensland during the twentieth century. While the co-operative operated many cheese and butter factories in the Darling Downs, the Toowoomba site was its headquarters, its largest factory and the site most closely associated with its operations. The Downs Co-operative had strong ties to the farming community, supporting farmers and encouraging the development of farming practices. The Downs Co-operative had a wide public profile through its key operations including milk distribution and high brand recognition through their Unity products.
