= Gowrie Little Plain, Queensland =

Rural locality in the Toowoomba Region

Gowrie Little Plain
- Suburb
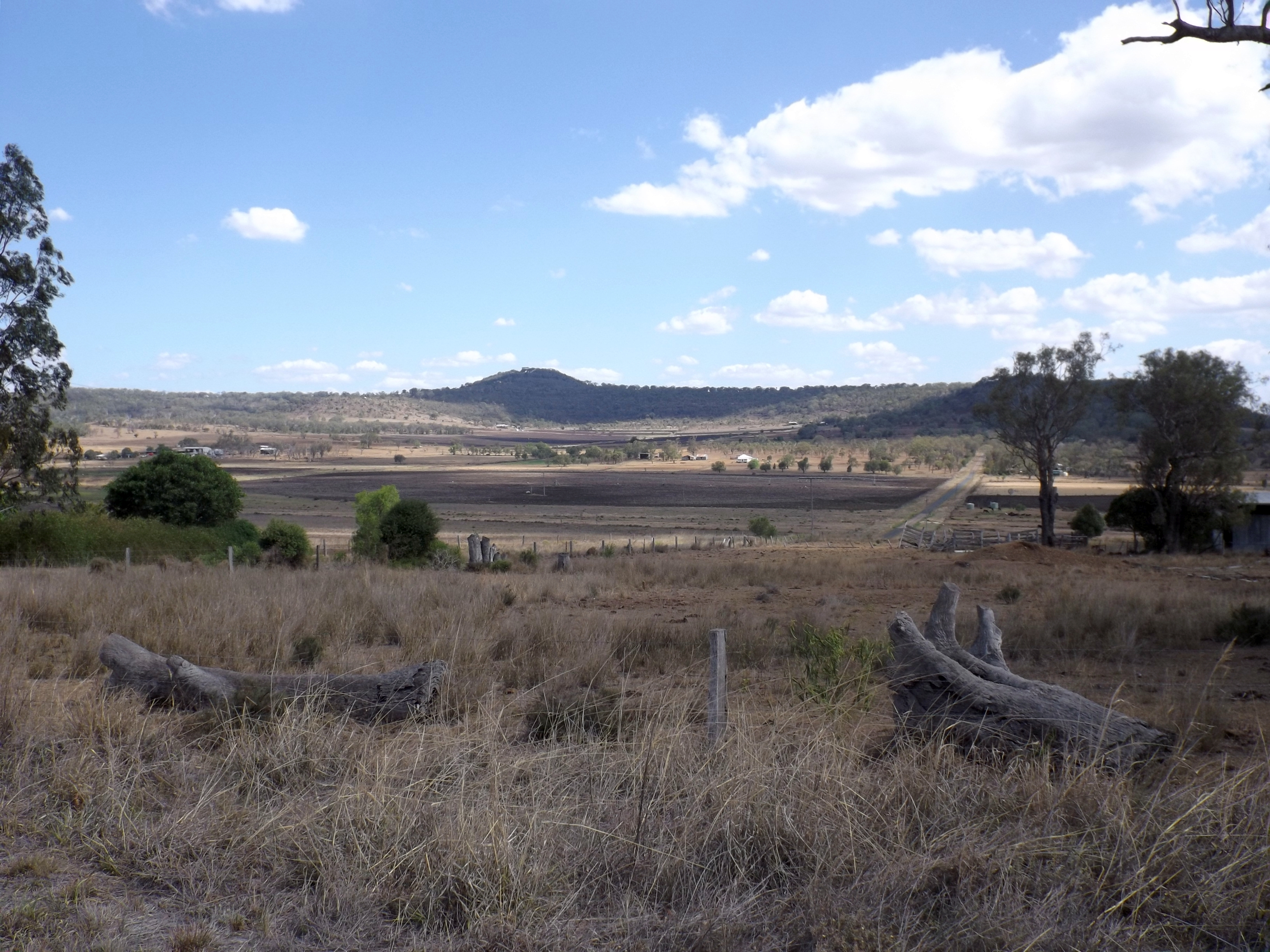
- Farms along Yalangur Lilyvale Road, 2014

- Interactive map of Gowrie Little Plain
- Coordinates: 27.4308°S 151.8458°E
- Country: Australia
- State: Queensland
- LGA: Toowoomba Region
- Location: 14.5 km (9.0 mi) WNW of Highfields; 15.1 km (9.4 mi) E of Oakey; 26.4 km (16.4 mi) NW of Toowoomba CBD; 150 km (93 mi) W of Brisbane

Government
  - State electorate: Condamine
  - Federal division: Groom

Area
  - Total: 11.7 km^{2} (4.5 sq mi)

Population
  - Total: 79 (2021 census)
  - Density: 6.75/km^{2} (17.49/sq mi)
- Time zone: UTC+10:00 (AEST)
- Postcode: 4352
Suburbs around Gowrie Little Plain
| Yalangur | Yalangur | Meringandan West |
| Yalangur | Gowrie Little Plain | Lilyvale |
| Cutella | Glencoe | Glencoe |

Gowrie Little Plain is a rural locality in the Toowoomba Region, Queensland, Australia. In the 2021 census, Gowrie Little Plain had a population of 79 people.

== Geography ==
Gowrie Little Plain is on the Darling Downs. In the south of the locality are a series of hills which rise to around 600 metres (2,000 ft) above sea level.

The land use is a mixture of grazing on native vegetation and crop growing.

== History ==
The locality takes its name from the nearby town of Gowrie. The town takes its name from a pastoral run which was named pastoralists Henry Hughes and Frederick N. Isaac, who initially called the property Stanbrook, but renamed it Gowrie in 1847. The name Gowrie is probably a corruption of cowarie, Aboriginal name for Gowrie Creek, which in turn possibly means freshwater mussel.

Gowrie Little Plain State School opened circa 1890 and closed in 1965. It was at approx 125 Gowrie Little Plain Road (27.4285°S 151.8517°E).

St Jude's Anglican church was dedicated on 20 July 1900 by Bishop William Webber. The church was on the main road overlooking the valley of Glencoe. The church was 30 by 18 feet (9.1 by 5.5 m) with a vestry 8 by 10 feet (2.4 by 3.0 m), and a porch 6 by 6 feet (1.8 by 1.8 m). It was built by L. P. Petersen. Its last service was held on 9 March 1951. It was at 341 Glencoe Yalangar Road (27.4430°S 151.8622°E).

The public hall was officially opened with a dance on 29 October 1932. The building was 60 by 25 feet (18.3 by 7.6 m) and built with volunteer labour supervised by Mr F. Heileg.

== Demographics ==
In the 2016 census, Gowrie Little Plain had a population of 65 people.

In the 2021 census, Gowrie Little Plain had a population of 79 people.

== Education ==
There are no schools in Gowrie Little Plain. The nearest government primary schools are Kingsthorpe State School in Kingsthorpe to the south-west and Meringandan State School in neighbouring Meringandan West to the north-east. The nearest government secondary schools are Oakey State High School in Oakey to the west and Highfields State Secondary College in Highfields to the east.

== Amenities ==
Gowrie Little Plain Hall and School of Arts is at 111 Gowrie Little Plain Road (27.4282°S 151.8506°E).
