= James Purcell =

James Purcell may refer to:

- James Purcell (actor), American actor and filmmaker
- James Purcell (businessman), Australian businessman
- James Purcell (mountain man), American mountain man of the 19th century
- James Purcell (politician), Australian politician
- James N. Purcell Jr., director of the Bureau of Refugee Programs

== See also ==
- Jim Purcell, chief of police in Portland, Oregon
