= Yalangur, Queensland =

Yalangur
- Suburb
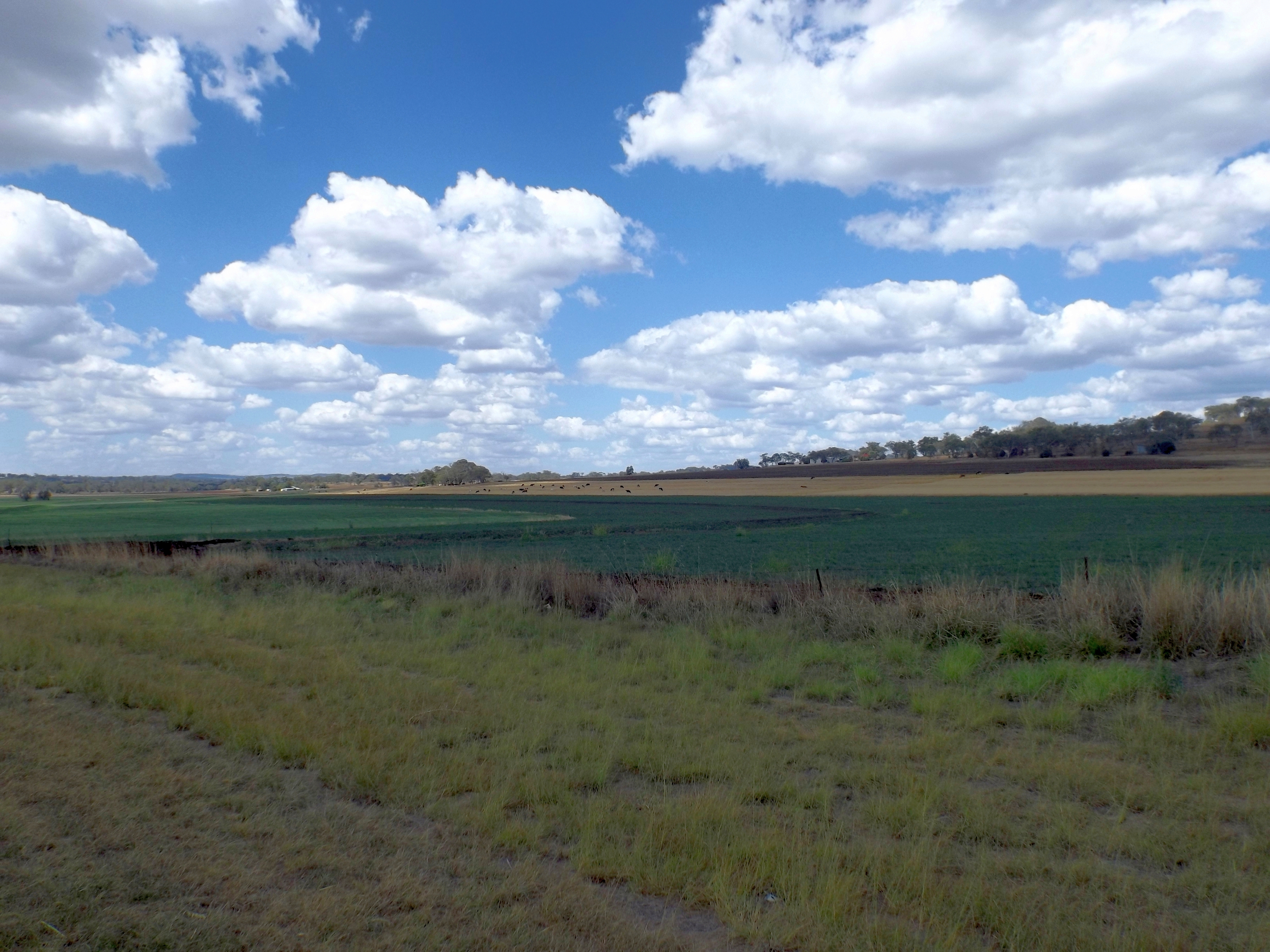
- Fields at Yalangur, 2014

- Interactive map of Yalangur
- Coordinates: 27.4188°S 151.8086°E
- Country: Australia
- State: Queensland
- LGA: Toowoomba Region
- Location: 7.4 km (4.6 mi) N of Kingsthorpe; 14.5 km (9.0 mi) WNW of Highfields; 16.0 km (9.9 mi) ENE of Oakey; 26.5 km (16.5 mi) NNW of Toowoomba CBD; 152 km (94 mi) W of Brisbane

Government
  - State electorate: Condamine
  - Federal division: Groom

Area
  - Total: 25.1 km^{2} (9.7 sq mi)

Population
  - Total: 55 (2021 census)
  - Density: 2.191/km^{2} (5.68/sq mi)
- Time zone: UTC+10:00 (AEST)
- Postcode: 4352
Suburbs around Yalangur
Kelvinhaugh	Boodua	Muniganeen
Oakey	Yalangur	Meringandan West
Kings Siding	Cutella	Gowrie Little Plain

Yalangur is a rural locality in the Toowoomba Region, Queensland, Australia. In the 2021 census, Yalangur had a population of 55 people.

== Geography ==
The locality is bounded to the north-west by Oakey Creek.

The terrain ranges from 420 to 572 metres (1,378 to 1,877 ft) above sea level with one named peak in the east of the locality, Mcgregor (27.4115°S 151.8499°E) at 570 metres (1,870 ft).

The land use is predominantly crop growing with some grazing on native vegetation.

== History ==
The locality takes its name from its former railway station, which is an Aboriginal word meaning eagle hawk.

Haden railway line operated from Kingsthorpe to Haden via Yalangur from 1910 to 1964 with Yalangur railway station just south of the Kelvinhaugh-Yalangur Road (27.41710°S 151.82437°E).

== Demographics ==
In the 2016 census, Yalangur had a population of 65 people.

In the 2021 census, Yalangur had a population of 55 people.

== Education ==
There are no schools in Yalangur. The nearest government primary school is Kingsthorpe State School in Kingsthorpe to the south. The nearest government secondary schools are Oakey State High School in Oakey to the south-west and Highfields State Secondary College in Highfields to the east.
