= Haden railway line =

Former railway line in Queensland, Australia

History
- Opened: 21 December 1910
- Closed: 1 May 1964

Technical
- Track gauge: 1,067 mm (3 ft 6 in)

Haden Branch Railway was a branch railway line from Kingsthorpe to Goombungee and Haden in the Darling Downs, Queensland, Australia.

Kingsthorpe is about twenty kilometres from Toowoomba on the Western railway line. The Queensland Parliament approved a 33-kilometre (21 mi) branch line north to Goombungee and Haden in December 1908.

The initial railway stations were Cutella, Yalangur, Boodua, Nara, Kudo, Goombungee, Bergen, and Wahoon.

First used on 21 December 1910, but officially opened in January 1911, the line terminated at Wahoon which was later renamed Haden after Alice Elizabeth Ruth Paget (née Haden), the wife of the railway minister Walter Paget.

Between Goombungee and Haden, sidings were established at Weelu and Neuve. A thrice weekly mixed service was replaced in 1930 by a daily rail motor and a twice weekly goods train.

The branch closed from 1 May 1964 due no doubt to economic reasons.
