= Lilyvale, Queensland (Toowoomba Region) =

Lilyvale Queensland
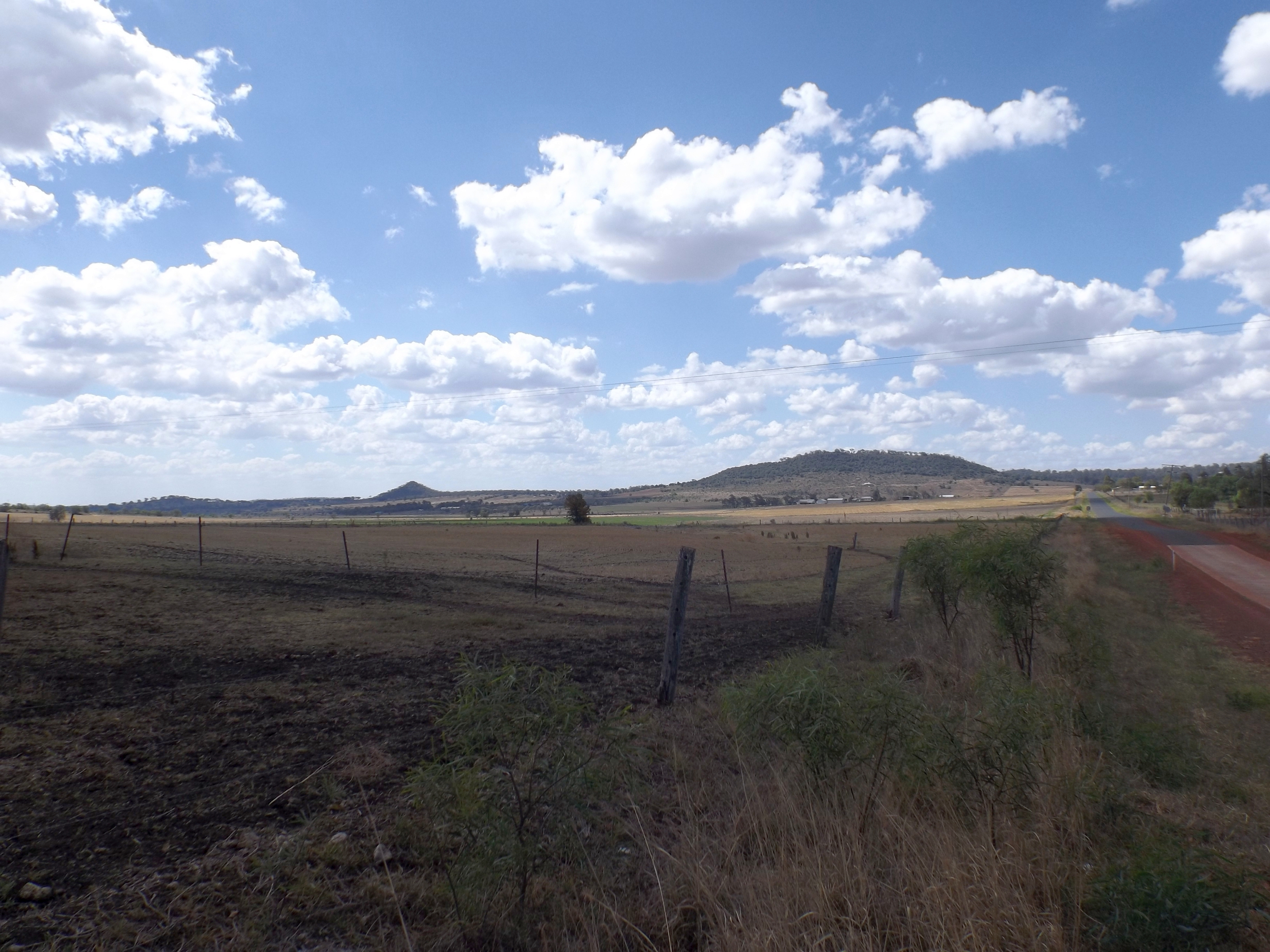
- Fields along Kingsthorpe Haden Road, 2014

- Coordinates: 27°22′S 151°49′E
- Population: 45 (2021 census)
- Postcode(s): 4352
- LGA(s): Toowoomba Region
- State electorate(s): Condamine
- Federal division(s): Groom
Suburbs around Lilyvale:
Gowrie Little Plain	Meringandan West	Meringandan West
Gowrie Little Plain	Lilyvale	Meringandan West
Glencoe	Glencoe	Glencoe

Lilyvale is a locality in the Toowoomba Region local government area on the Darling Downs in southern Queensland, Australia. In the 2021 census, Lilyvale had a population of 45 people.

== Geography ==
A prominent hill in the north of the area remains mostly vegetated and reaches elevations above 590 m. A second hill in the southeast rises to around 570 m. The rest of Lilyvale has been cleared for agricultural purposes.

== History ==
The Downs Co-operative Dairy Association opened a cheese factory at Lilyvale in 1926.

== Demographics ==
In the 2016 census, Lilyvale had a population of 55 people.

In the 2021 census, Lilyvale had a population of 45 people.
