= Glencoe, Queensland =

Glencoe
- Suburb
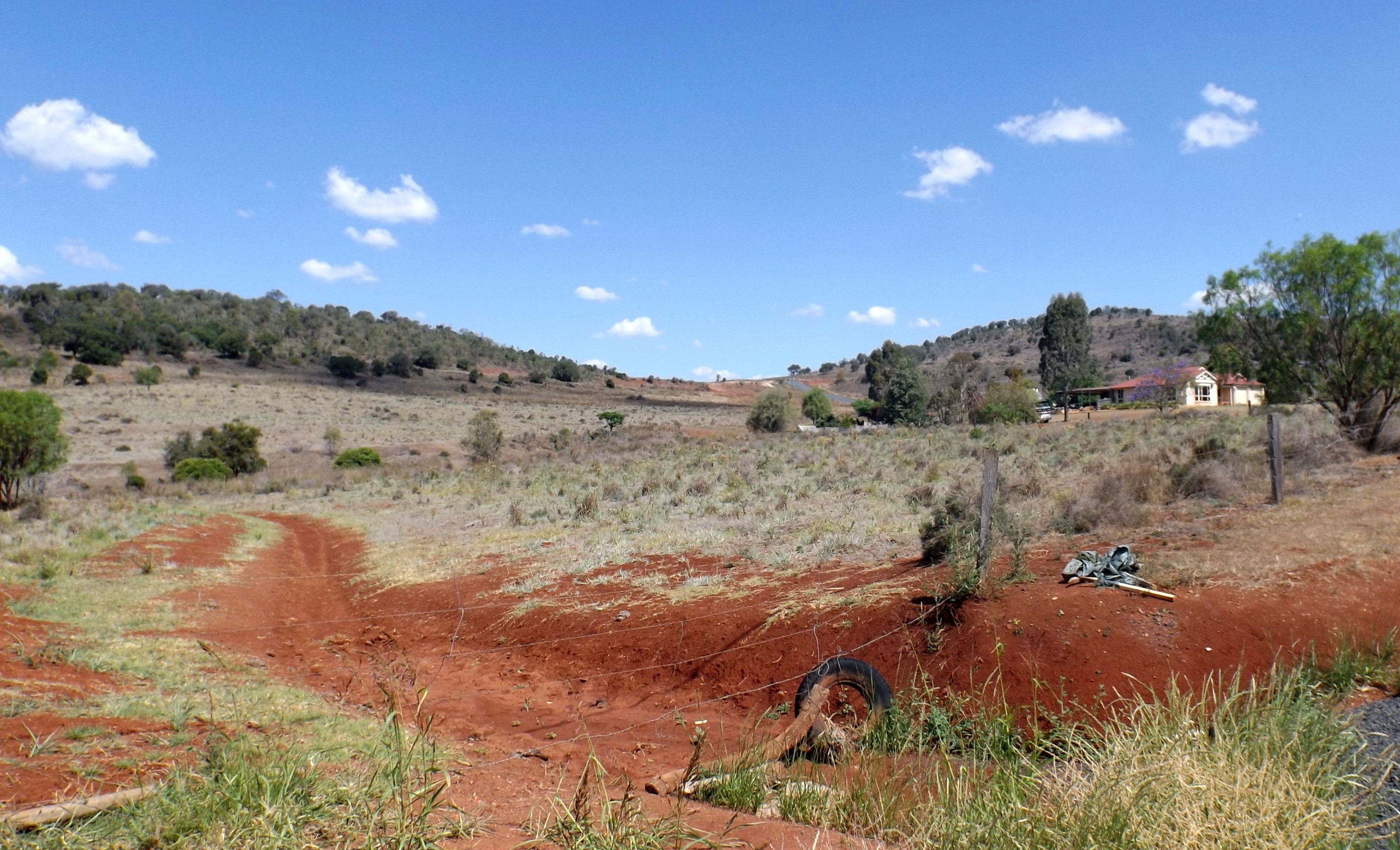
- Rural home and fields, 2014

- Interactive map of Glencoe
- Coordinates: 27.4625°S 151.8672°E
- Country: Australia
- State: Queensland
- LGA: Toowoomba Region
- Location: 19.1 km (11.9 mi) NW of Toowoomba CBD; 144 km (89 mi) W of Brisbane

Government
  - State electorate: Condamine
  - Federal division: Groom

Area
  - Total: 19.0 km^{2} (7.3 sq mi)

Population
  - Total: 304 (2021 census)
  - Density: 16.00/km^{2} (41.44/sq mi)
- Time zone: UTC+10:00 (AEST)
- Postcode: 4352
Suburbs around Glencoe
Gowrie Little Plain	Lilyvale	Meringandan West
Cutella	Glencoe	Cawdor
Kingsthorpe	Gowrie Junction	Gowrie Junction

Glencoe is a rural locality in the Toowoomba Region, Queensland, Australia. The area was once known as Gowrie Scrub. In the 2021 census, Glencoe had a population of 304 people.

== Geography ==
Storey is a mountain in the west of the locality (27.4550°S 151.8494°E) rising to 687 metres (2,254 ft).

== History ==
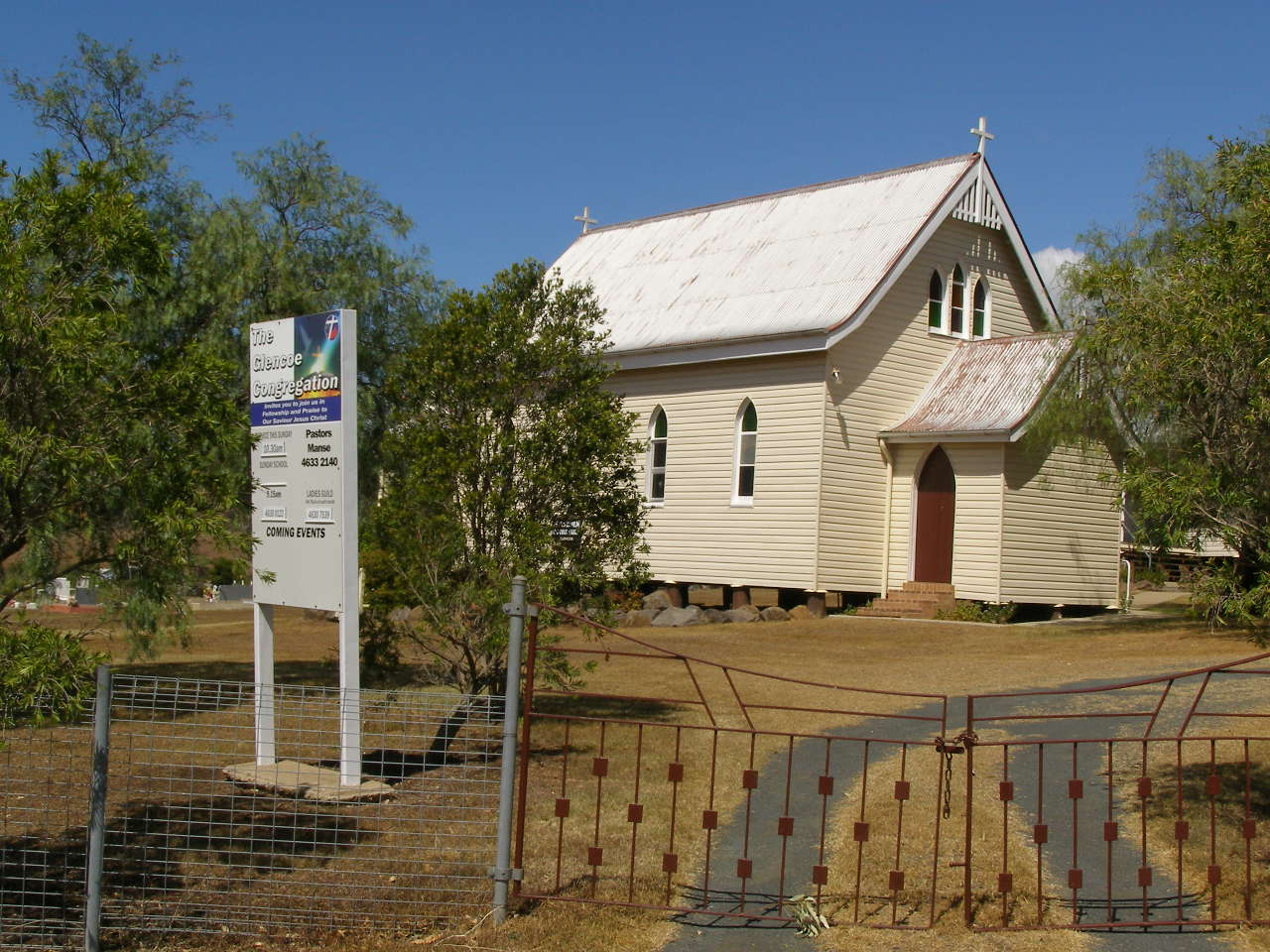
Bethlehem Lutheran Church, Glencoe, 2007

The Bethlehem Lutheran Church opened in 1880 and celebrated its 125th anniversary in 2005.

Glencoe State School opened circa 1882 and closed circa 1941. It was at 62 Glencoe Yalangur Road (27.4630°S 151.8540°E).

On Sunday 29 July 1900, Bishop William Webber officially opened St Jude's Church of England. It was on a 1-acre (0.40 ha) site on the slope of Glencoe Mountain (now called Storey). It was at 341 Glencoe Yalangur Road (27.44301°S 151.8625°E).

The first burial in Glencoe general cemetery was in 25 October 2004.

== Demographics ==
In the 2016 census, Glencoe had a population of 322 people.

In the 2021 census, Glencoe had a population of 304 people.

== Education ==
There are no schools in Glencoe. The nearest government primary schools are Kingsthorpe State School in neighbouring Kingsthorpe to the south-west, Meringandan State School in neighbouring Meringandan West to the north-east, and Gowrie State School in neighbouring Gowrie Junction to the south-east. The nearest government secondary schools are Highfields State Secondary College in Highfields to the east, Oakey State High School in Oakey to the west, and Wilsonton State High School in Wilsonton Heights to the south-east.

== Amenities ==
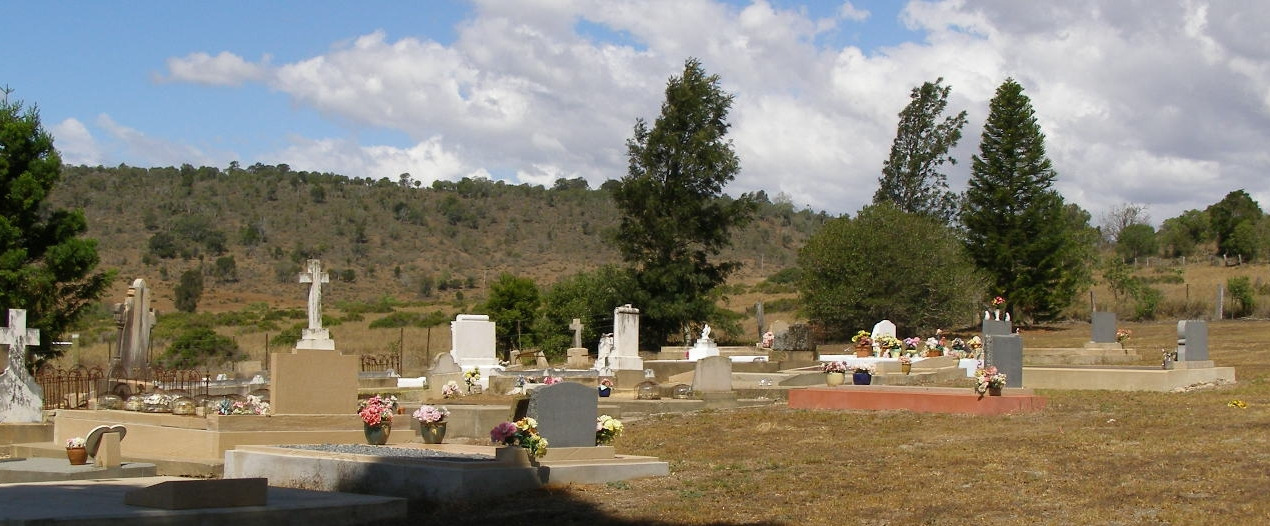
Lutheran cemetery, Glencoe, 2007

Glencoe Lutheran Church (formerly Bethlehem Lutheran Church) is at 317 Gowrie Glencoe Road (27.4700°S 151.8606°E).

Two cemeteries are located adjacent to one another in Glencoe Road. One is associated with the neighbouring Lutheran Church (27.4700°S 151.8611°E). the other is a non-denominational lawn cemetery (27.4700°S 151.8613°E) operated by the Toowoomba Regional Council.
