= Cutella, Queensland =

Cutella
- Suburb
- Interactive map of Cutella
- Coordinates: 27.4552°S 151.8177°E
- Country: Australia
- State: Queensland
- LGA: Toowoomba Region
- Location: 2.9 km (1.8 mi) N of Kingsthorpe; 11.6 km (7.2 mi) E of Oakey; 22.9 km (14.2 mi) NW of Toowoomba CBD; 148 km (92 mi) W of Brisbane

Government
  - State electorate: Condamine
  - Federal division: Groom

Area
  - Total: 8.6 km^{2} (3.3 sq mi)

Population
  - Total: 45 (2021 census)
  - Density: 5.23/km^{2} (13.55/sq mi)
- Time zone: UTC+10:00 (AEST)
- Postcode: 4352
Suburbs around Cutella
Yalangur	Yalangur	Gowrie Little Plain
Kings Siding	Cutella	Glencoe
Kings Siding	Kingsthorpe	Kingsthorpe

Cutella is a rural locality in the Toowoomba Region, Queensland, Australia. In the 2021 census, Cutella had a population of 45 people.

== Geography ==
Cutella is a rural area immediately north of the town of Kingsthorpe. The land use is predominantly crop growing with some grazing on native vegetation.

The Sugar Loaf is a mountain in the south-west of the locality (27.4566°S 151.8088°E) rising to 559 metres (1,834 ft) above sea level.

The Kingsthorpe–Haden Road enters the locality from the south (Kingsthorpe) and exits to the north (Yalangur / Gowrie Little Plain).

== History ==
The locality takes its name from its railway station named on 12 May 1910 by the Queensland Railways Department with an Aboriginal word meaning eagle.

The Kingsthorpe to Haden railway line opened on 21 December 1910 with Cutella served by the Cutella railway station (approx 27.45166°S 151.81725°E). The line closed on 1 May 1964.

== Demographics ==
In the 2016 census, Cutella had a population of 29 people.

In the 2021 census, Cutella had a population of 45 people.

== Education ==
There are no schools in Cutella. The nearest government primary school is Kingsthorpe State School in neighbouring Kingsthorpe to the south. The nearest government secondary school is Oakey State High School in Oakey to the west.
