= Kings Siding, Queensland =

Kings Siding
- Suburb
- Interactive map of Kings Siding
- Coordinates: 27.4533°S 151.7902°E
- Country: Australia
- State: Queensland
- LGA: Toowoomba Region
- Location: 25.8 km (16.0 mi) NW of Toowoomba CBD; 154 km (96 mi) W of Brisbane

Government
  - State electorate: Condamine
  - Federal division: Groom

Area
  - Total: 5.5 km^{2} (2.1 sq mi)

Population
  - Total: 15 (2021 census)
  - Density: 2.73/km^{2} (7.06/sq mi)
- Time zone: UTC+10:00 (AEST)
- Postcode: 4401
Suburbs around Kings Siding
Oakey	Yalangur	Yalangur
Oakey	Kings Siding	Cutella
Oakey	Kingsthorpe	Kingsthorpe

Kings Siding is a rural locality in the Toowoomba Region, Queensland, Australia. In the 2021 census, Kings Siding had a population of 15 people.

== Geography ==
The locality is bounded to the south by the Western railway line. The land is relatively flat, ranging from 420 to 450 metres (1,380 to 1,480 ft) above sea level. The land use is a mix of crop growing and grazing on native vegetation.

Kings railway siding was on the Western railway on the boundary between the localities of Kings Siding and Kingsthorpe (27.4648°S 151.7864°E).

== History ==
The locality was officially named and bounded on 7 September 2001. The name refers to the former KIngs railway siding on the Western railway line which, like neighbouring Kingsthorpe, takes its name King from George King and his family of pastoralists who owned the Gowrie pastoral station from 1841. The siding was established by 1891. In 1902 the siding is called King and Sons' Siding and is adjacent to the coal mine established by the King family, but in 1975 appears simply as King's Siding.

== Demographics ==
In the 2016 census, Kings Siding had a population of 16 people.

In the 2021 census, Kings Siding had a population of 15 people.

== Education ==
There are no schools in King's Siding. The nearest government primary school is Kingsthorpe State School in neighbouring Kingsthorpe to the south-east. The nearest government secondary school is Oakey State High School in Oakey to the west.
