= Wellcamp State School =

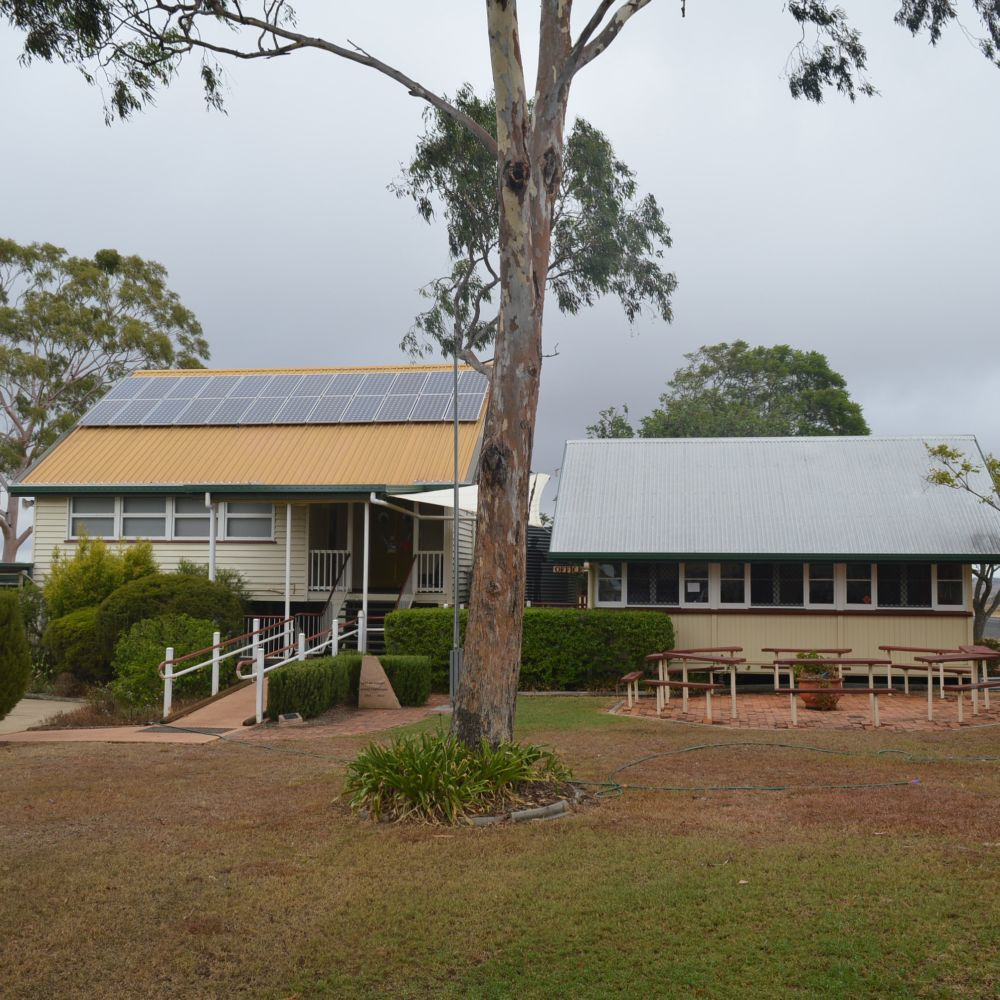
- Wellcamp State School, Block A and Block L, 2019

- Location within Queensland
- 27.5544°S 151.8509°E
- Location: 609 Drayton–Wellcamp Road, Wellcamp, Toowoomba Region, Queensland, Australia

History
- Design period: 1900–1914 (Early 20th century)
- Built: 1911, Block A, 1918, Block L

Site notes
- Architect: Department of Public Works (Queensland)

Queensland Heritage Register
- Official name: Wellcamp State School
- Type: state heritage
- Designated: 27 March 2020
- Reference no.: 650248
- Type: Education, Research, Scientific Facility: School – state (primary)
- Theme: Educating Queenslanders: Providing primary schooling

Wellcamp State School is a heritage-listed state school at 609 Drayton–Wellcamp Road, Wellcamp, Toowoomba Region, Queensland, Australia. Block A was designed by Department of Public Works (Queensland) and built in 1911, while Block L was building in 1918. It was added to the Queensland Heritage Register on 27 March 2020.

== History ==
Wellcamp State School was established in 1899 as Wellcamp Provisional School in Wellcamp, a rural area 17 kilometres west of the centre of Toowoomba. It retains good examples of standard school architecture (Block A, 1911 and Block L, 1918), set within spacious grounds with mature trees, play areas, and sporting facilities. In continuous operation since its establishment, the school has been a focus for the surrounding community as a place of important social and cultural activity.

Part of the traditional land of the Western Wakka Wakka people, the locality of Wellcamp was once within Westbrook pastoral station, leased by John Campbell in 1841. By 1864, the future site of the school, on Portion 115, was located in the northwest corner of the Drayton Agricultural Reserve, declared in 1861. The Drayton Agricultural Reserve covered 11,000 acres, or 4452ha. Portion 115, of 40 acres (16 hectares), was purchased by Mary McCleverty in December 1867, and by 1881 it was owned by James Paterson. From the late 19th century, the district was used for dairy farming and agriculture.

Wellcamp was established c. 1866 as "Williams Camp", the main railway construction camp for the 47 miles (76 km) section of the Southern railway between Gowrie Junction and Hendon. Located on Portion 113, east of Portion 115, the construction camp was named after Daniel Williams, the contractor for the section. Bisected by the railway line, Portion 113 later became the site of a railway station. The Southern Railway was opened (through Williams Camp) to Hendon on 11 March 1869; to Warwick on 9 January 1871; Stanthorpe in 1881, and Wallangarra in 1887.

The name "Williams Camp" was replaced by "Wellcamp" c. 1878; apparently because there was a well at the construction camp. However, the name Wellcamp was not used in Pugh's Almanac and Directory until 1883, referring to the railway station. A number of facilities were erected at or near the Wellcamp railway station over time, including a cottage for the gatekeeper, a station building, weighbridge and goods shed (c. 1883), loop siding, stockyards and loading bank. The Wellcamp Hotel opened in 1908 and was offered for sale in 1922. A small reinforced-concrete factory for cheese making was opened in 1917 by the Standard Dairy Co. of Brisbane, as an "auxiliary" to the company's condensing factory at Wyreema. The cheese factory was closed in 1942, but was still extant at 2019.

Due to closer settlement in the Wellcamp district after the railway opened, the population increased and there was a need for a school. The establishment of schools was considered an essential step in the development of new communities and integral to their success. Locals often donated land and labour for a school's construction and the school community contributed to maintenance and development. Schools became a community focus, a symbol of progress, and a source of pride, with enduring connections formed with past pupils, parents, and teachers.

To help ensure consistency and economy, the Queensland Government developed standard plans for its school buildings. From the 1860s until the 1960s, Queensland school buildings were predominantly timber-framed, an easy and cost-effective approach that also enabled the government to provide facilities in remote areas. Standard designs were continually refined in response to changing needs and educational philosophy and Queensland school buildings were particularly innovative in climate control, lighting, and ventilation.

An important component of Queensland state schools was their grounds. The early and continuing commitment to play-based education, particularly in primary school, resulted in the provision of outdoor play space and sporting facilities, such as ovals and tennis courts. Also, Trees and gardens were planted to shade and beautify schools. Arbor Day celebrations began in Queensland in 1890.

The first school at Wellcamp, located less than one kilometre west of the railway station, was a provisional school. These were provided where student numbers were insufficient to justify a state school. A committee was formed in July 1898, at a meeting in the railway gatekeeper's cottage, to obtain a school. The school's site, 1 acre (0.40 hectares) of Portion 115, was purchased from James Paterson for £5 and transferred to the Secretary for Public Instruction in January 1899. Wellcamp Provisional School opened with 27 students on 27 February 1899, and its opening was celebrated with an Arbor Day picnic in May 1899. The timber school building was lowset, with a verandah at the rear. In 1903, two more acres (0.8ha) of Portion 115 were added to the school grounds, although title for this land was not transferred until 1936. A Methodist church was just south of the school from 1905 to 1932.

The first school building quickly became the centre of Wellcamp's social life, as a venue for dances, and meetings of organisations, including a committee in support of extending a telephone line from Toowoomba to Wellcamp, and farmers interested in forming a local dairy company. It was not the only local dance venue, however; in 1903 a concert and dance was also held at the railway goods shed, to raise funds for the school.

In May 1909, when it had 43 pupils, Wellcamp Provisional School became Wellcamp State School. A teacher's residence was moved from New Farm State School in 1910, and positioned to the east of Wellcamp's teaching building. The original school building was then replaced in 1911, when enrolments totalled 63. Erection of the new building was approved in May 1911, with the local community to pay a fifth of the cost. The tender of A Barr, for £577 and 16s, was accepted in October 1911. A dance was held in the completed school building in March 1912.

The new school building (Block A in 2019) was a standard type designed by the Department of Public Works (DPW): a Timber School Building with Fleche and Floor Vent. From 1893 the DPW greatly improved the natural ventilation and lighting of classroom interiors, experimenting with different combinations of roof ventilators, ceiling and wall vents, larger windows, dormer windows and ducting. Achieving an ideal or even adequate level of natural light in classrooms, without glare, was of critical importance to educators. In c. 1909 highset timber buildings were introduced, providing better ventilation as well as further teaching space and a covered play area underneath. A technical innovation developed at this time was a continuous ventilation flap on the wall at floor level. This hinged board could be opened to increase air flow into the space and, combined with a ceiling vent and large roof fleche, improved internal air quality and decreased internal temperatures effectively. This type was introduced around 1909 and was constructed until approximately 1920. Another example was built at Mount Sylvia State School in 1912.

Block A was a highset timber-framed and -clad building with a gable roof, clad in corrugated iron. It had 8 ft (2.4 m) wide verandahs to the front (north) and rear (south), each accessed by a centrally located staircase, in line with sets of double doors to the single classroom, which was 31 by 20 ft (9.4 by 6.1 m). The interior had abundant natural light and ventilation. Large banks of operable windows in the east and west gable walls, shaded by window hoods, and sets of highset operable windows in the south wall, shaded by the verandah, provided ample light and air. This ventilation was augmented by hinged timber boards in the verandah walls at floor level, and two vents in the lofty coved ceiling connected to a roof fleche. According to the plan drawn by DPW, hat rooms were proposed for the west end of both verandahs. The building was clad with weatherboards, except for the walls to the verandahs, which were single skin with framing exposed externally, and the interior walls and ceiling were lined with v-jointed tongue and groove boards. By 1949, a hat room had been added to the east end of the north verandah.

Block A was immediately used for community purposes, including a banquet in honour of the President of the Queensland Farmer's Union; a lecture on cheese factories; and dances in aid of school funds and the Toowoomba Ambulance Fund. Entertainment was also provided for Captain Jack Brown of the Australian Light Horse, while he was home on leave in October 1917. A fete and sports carnival was held at the school in October 1925, the same month that the Federal Attorney General, Sir Littleton Groom, addressed voters at the school. The Wellcamp Queensland Country Women's Association also used the school for meetings in the 1930s. Arbor Days continued to be a social event for the community, with picnic lunches and plantings. The school's 50th Jubilee was celebrated on 23 February 1949, with a large crowd on the grounds. A 1949 photograph of the school building during the Jubilee shows that the front verandah had semi-enclosed hat rooms at both ends by this time. What may be two Cypress pine trees (genus Callitris) are also shown, planted either side of the path north of the building, but these are not extant in 2019.

After Block A was constructed, decades passed with few changes to the fabric of the single-classroom school. In 1914, approval was given to enclose underneath Block A on two sides, and in 1916 a storeroom was built under the southwest corner (this area is still enclosed in 2019). Permission to build a tennis court (located between Block A and the residence) was given in 1920, and the teacher's residence was removed in 1928. The hat room at the west end of the rear verandah was incorporated into a storeroom in 1961. Enrolments were low in the post-World War II period (18 pupils in 1946; 25 in 1957), and by the 1960s the school still only consisted of Block A, with a number of mature plantings around the perimeter of the north end of the school, including pepperina trees (Schinus molle). These trees' branches were sometimes used for disciplinary purposes. Aerial photographs in 1955, 1965 and 1975 show the school building and the former site of the residence, at the north end of the school grounds, surrounded by a perimeter planting of trees. A Parents and Citizens Association was formed in 1965, and held card nights in the school building to raise funds for the school.

By this time, the railway line from Gowrie Junction to Wyreema, through Wellcamp, had closed. When the route to Warwick was shortened in 1915 with the opening of a new railway line from Toowoomba to Wyreema via Drayton, traffic on the old line fell dramatically. The Gowrie Junction to Wyreema section finally closed on 1 December 1959, by which time Wellcamp Station had already been dismantled.

In the 1960s, the district was still dominated by dairy farms, with milk being supplied to the Toowoomba Unity factory. However, from the 1970s dairy farming declined, being replaced by beef cattle and grain crops, while subdivision patterns also changed. The opening of the Gainsborough Lodge horse stud nearby brought new families into the area, and enrolments at Wellcamp State School rose from 27 in 1973, to 40 in 1975, and 46 in 1983. The school celebrated its 75th jubilee on 23 February 1974. The land between the school and the railway station, both north and south of the Drayton-Wellcamp Road, was subdivided into housing blocks in 1908, but a town never developed. In 1972, the allotments south of the road were re-subdivided into 5 acres (2.0 hectares) blocks.

As a result of increased enrolments, the grounds were expanded and new buildings were added to the school from the late 1970s. Five acres (2.0 hectares) of land was purchased at the southeast corner of the school c. 1980, creating the current ground size of 8 acres (3.2 hectares). The new land was combined with the land purchased in 1903, to form Portion 206, by 1980. New buildings included a modular classroom building (Block B in 2019), erected northeast of Block A in 1977, and a new toilet block and septic system was installed south of the school buildings in 1978, replacing the previous Earth Closets. In the late 1970s, a new tennis court was formed on the former site of the teacher's residence, and later a concrete block shelter shed (Block M) and a storeroom were added nearby. An adventure playground was built in 1986, and a practice cricket wicket, and a covered walkway between the school buildings and the toilets, were added in 1988. A building (Block D) was moved to the school, opening in 1994 as a "community room", located south of Block A; and a shed was added south of the toilets by 1998. Block R was added north of Block B c. 2009-11, and a new tennis court was built in the southwest corner of the school c. 2013-16, when Block N was built on the southern end of the 1970s tennis court.

Alterations to Block A also occurred from the 1970s. In 1973, the P&C requested the enclosure of the rear verandah, although this was deferred due to restumping and concreting under the school. The majority of the front verandah of Block A was enclosed for a library in 1976, with the stairs moved to the west end of the verandah. The building was reroofed in 1982, and in 1983 permanent seating and a storage shed were approved for underneath the building. A health room existed on the rear verandah, east of the central stairs, by 1983. In 1999, a store room wall was removed from the west end of the rear verandah, and the remainder of the verandah west of the health room (an office by 1998) was enclosed as a Practical Learning Area, with new rear stairs and landing. By this time Block A's banks of windows in the gable end walls had been replaced within the original openings. After 2006, a suspended ceiling was added to the classroom space; but there is no evidence that the original coved ceiling, lattice ceiling vents and metal tie rods have been removed.

In c. 2005-6, another early DPW-designed building, Block L, was added to the school, just northwest of Block A. Small and lowset, it was a late version of an "open-air" building, originally constructed in 1918 for Tangkam State School (1918–61), southwest of Oakey. Tangkam State School opened on 26 November 1918 and closed on 22 January 1961. Tangkam railway station was located on the line from Oakey to Cecil Plains, about 20 km northwest of Wellcamp State School.

Open-air school buildings were introduced as a standard design in 1913. This was developed in response to contemporary medical concern for child health and, under the direction of the newly-appointed Medical Inspector of Schools, Dr Eleanor Bourne, the relationship between classroom environment and child health was given importance. Dr Bourne advocated abundant ventilation and high levels of natural light in classrooms. Open-air school buildings achieved maximum ventilation and natural light, having full height walls only on the west side, and half off the south side, of the building. The other sides were partly open, enclosable with canvas blinds. However, this proved to provide limited weather protection and climate control, and the canvas blinds deteriorated quickly. Consequently, later open-air school buildings were designed with fixed and sliding windows instead of blinds, and a sliding door on the south side. Late Open-air school buildings were discontinued in 1923, and all earlier examples in Queensland were modified to replace their blinds with windows.

The building at Wellcamp State School is a Late Open-air School Building. As a variant within this type, it was designed with a gable roof instead of the usual hipped roof, and louvered vents and shingle cladding at its gable ends. Although no original plans of the Tangkam Late Open-air school building exist, its roof is similar to that designed for the Open-air school building at Birimgan State School at Birimgan via Blair Athol. Late Open-air school buildings with hipped roofs were designed for Deep Creek (1920), Biddeston (1921), Cinnibar Upper (1921) and Lower Beechmont (1921). At Wellcamp, its original west wall faces south. At some point the doorway configuration of the building was altered; the sliding door at the east end was replaced with a swing door and wall sheeting, while the door at the west end was removed, and a new door was added on the south side. The shingles at the apex of the west gable end survive in 2019. Block L is rare as one of only two known extant examples of the Late Open-air type in Queensland, and the only one with a gable roof with louvered vents and shingles. The only other known surviving Late Open-air school building is located on Chevallum School Road, Chevallum, but is no longer used as school building.

In 2019, Wellcamp State School continues to operate from its 1899 site. It retains its two early standard buildings (Block A and Block L), set in grounds with a playing field and mature shade trees. The school has played an important role in the Wellcamp and district community and continues to do so.

== Description ==
Wellcamp State School occupies a 3.2ha, flat site in Wellcamp, a rural locality located on the western fringe of Toowoomba, approximately 17 km west of Toowoomba central business district. The school faces north to Drayton-Wellcamp Road, with the site bounded on the west by Wellcamp-Westbrook Road, and the south and east by rural residential properties. The significant school buildings are located in the northwest corner of the site, prominently located near the road intersection.

The heritage boundary incorporates the northwest corner of the school site (total area of 1.2ha) with features of state-level cultural heritage significance being:

- Block A: Department of Public Works Timber School Building with Fleche and Floor Vent (1911)
- Block L: Late Open-air school building (1918 at Tangkam State School, moved to Wellcamp State School c. 2005)
- Landscaped grounds

=== Block A ===
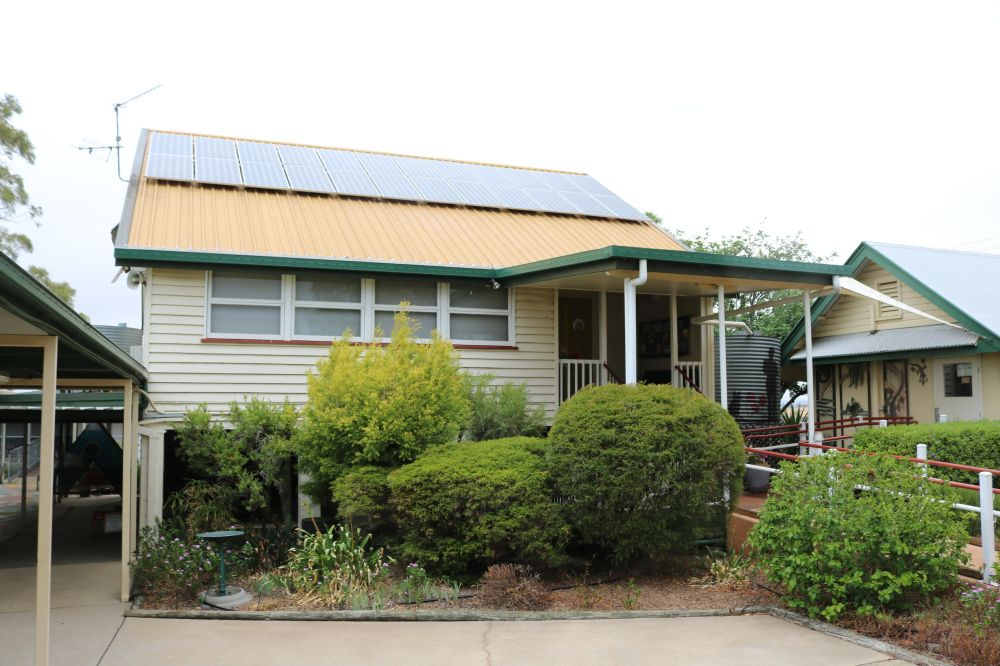
Block A from the north, 2019

Block A is a highset, timber-framed and -clad teaching building with a gable roof continuous over front (north) and rear (south) verandahs. The verandahs have been partially enclosed and part of the north verandah wall has been removed. Access to verandahs is via front and rear stairs (the rear stair is centred on the south elevation; and the front stair has been relocated from the centre to the west end of the north elevation). The roof fleche has been removed.

The interior comprises a single classroom, with large banks of operable windows in the gable ends providing abundant natural light and ventilation to the space.

The understorey is partially enclosed and used as open play space.

=== Block L ===
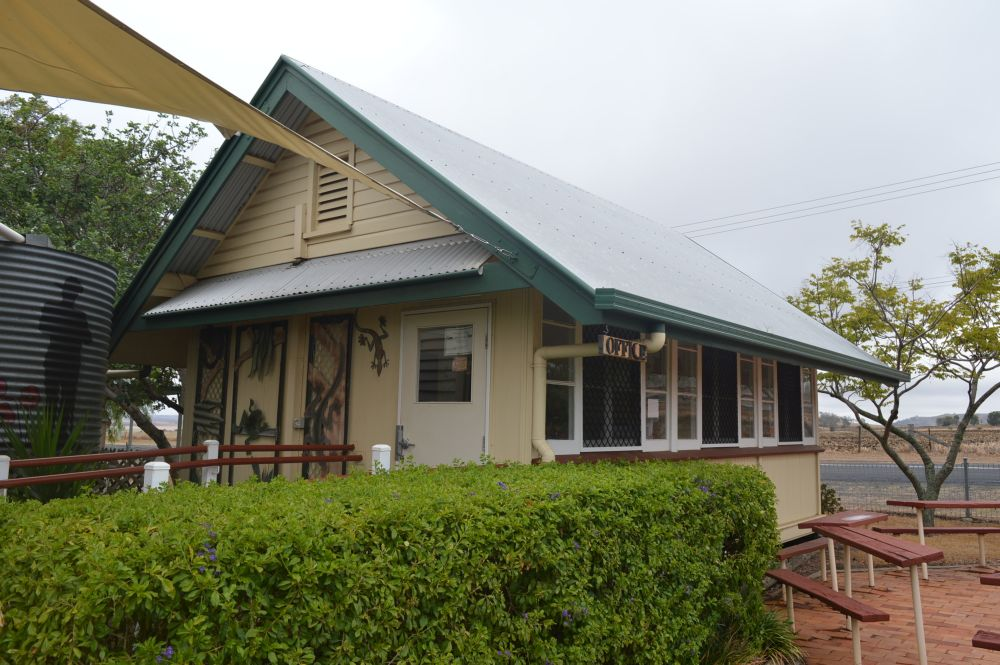
Block L from the north-east, 2019

Block L is a lowset, single storey, timber-framed and -clad former teaching building. The building has a gable roof and features separate skillion hoods running the length of the gable ends. The main access to the building is from the east elevation (where a swing door and wall sheeting have replaced the original sliding door), and a door has been added into the south elevation for staff access.

The interior comprises a single former classroom space (now administration), with a coved ceiling and a large bank of north-facing windows.

== Heritage listing ==
Wellcamp State School was listed on the Queensland Heritage Register on 27 March 2020 having satisfied the following criteria.

The place is important in demonstrating the evolution or pattern of Queensland's history.

Wellcamp State School (established as Wellcamp Provisional School in 1899) is important in demonstrating the evolution of state education and its associated architecture in Queensland. The place retains good representative examples of standard government designs that were architectural responses to prevailing government educational philosophies, set in large grounds with provision of sport and play areas, and mature trees.

The Department of Public Works (DPW) Timber School Building with Fleche and Floor Vent (Block A, 1911) demonstrates the evolution of timber school buildings to provide abundant lighting and ventilation.

The Late Open-air School Building (Block L, 1918, originally from Tangkam State School, relocated to Wellcamp c. 2005) demonstrates medical and educational theories of the period, which valued fresh air.

The large school grounds and its mature shade trees and open grassed playing field demonstrate the Queensland Government's recognition of the importance of play and aesthetics in the education of children.

The place demonstrates rare, uncommon or endangered aspects of Queensland's cultural heritage.

Block L, a Late Open-air School Building, is rare as one of only two known extant examples of its type in Queensland.

The place is important in demonstrating the principal characteristics of a particular class of cultural places.

Wellcamp State School is important in demonstrating the principal characteristics of a Queensland state school. These include: timber-framed buildings constructed to standard designs by the Queensland Government; and generous, landscaped sites with mature shade trees, and play areas. The school is a good example of a small, country school.

Block A is important in demonstrating the principal characteristics of its type, a Department of Public Works Timber School Building with Fleche and Floor Vent. Its integrity is demonstrated by its highset form with gable roof; open understorey play space; front and rear verandahs with hatrooms; timber-framed and -clad construction; single classroom; and methods to provide abundant provision of natural light and ventilation to the interior including its hinged ventilation boards and large banks of operable windows.

Block L is a rare surviving example of a Late Open-air School Building, and is important in demonstrating the principal characteristics of its type. These include: its lowset form on stumps; timber-framed construction; single classroom space with timber sliding and fixed windows providing abundant natural light and ventilation to the interior; V-jointed (VJ) timber board cladding; and (evidence of) a large sliding door in one end wall. As a gable-roofed variant of a Late Open-air School Building, it also retains louvre vents in the gable ends, and a shingled gable.

The place has a strong or special association with a particular community or cultural group for social, cultural or spiritual reasons.

Wellcamp State School has a strong and ongoing association with past and present pupils, parents, staff members, and the surrounding community through sustained use since its establishment in 1899, when it was founded due to a strong community demand for state-run education. The place is important for its contribution to the educational development of Wellcamp, with generations of children taught at the school, and its service as a prominent venue for social interaction and community focus. After its establishment, the school quickly became the centre of the community's social life; and the strength of this association has continued to be demonstrated for more than 120 years through repeated volunteer action, donations, and an active Parents and Citizens Association.
