= Wellcamp, Queensland =

Wellcamp
- Suburb
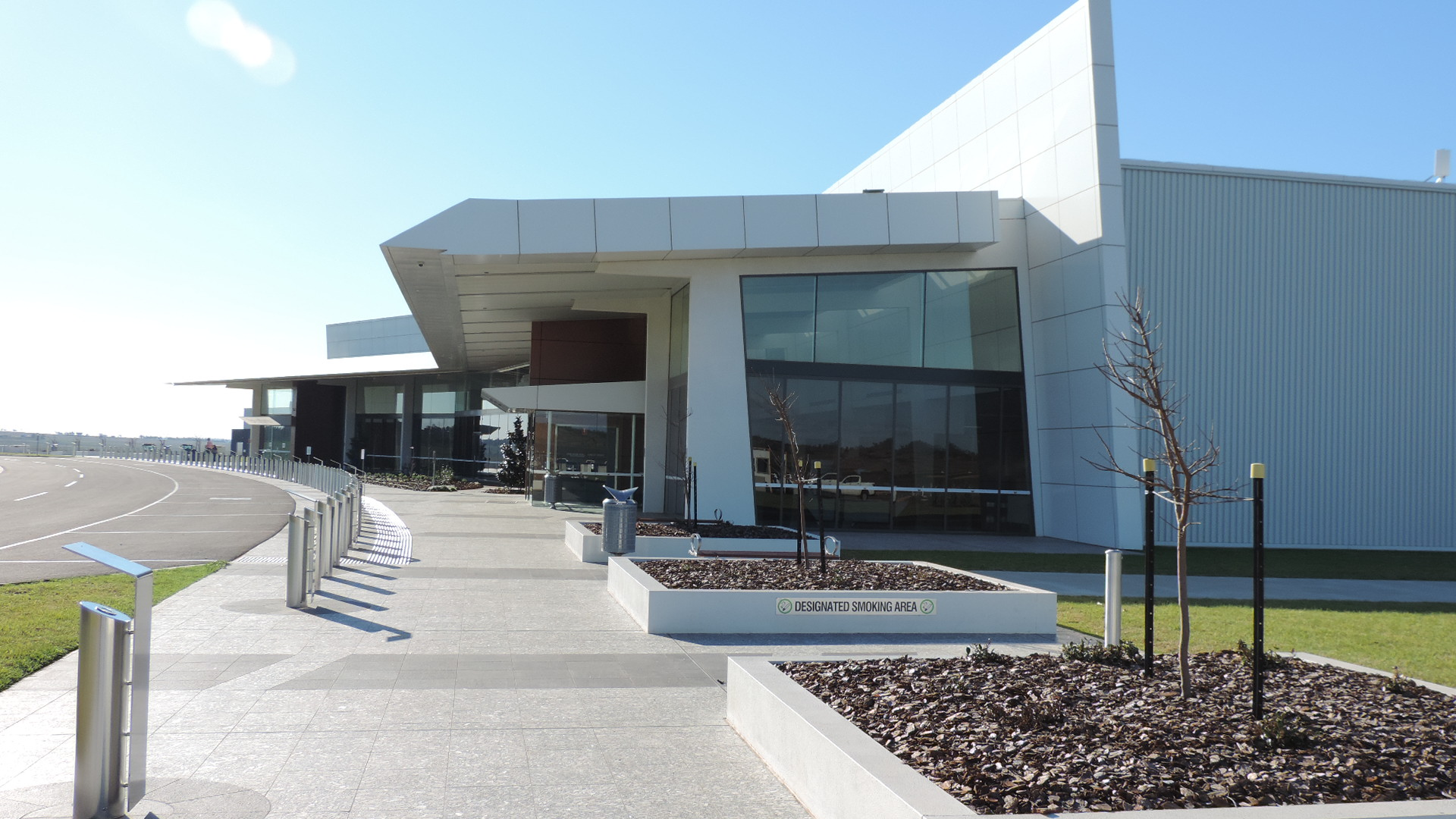
- Approach to the passenger terminal, Toowoomba Wellcamp Airport, 2016

- Interactive map of Wellcamp
- Coordinates: 27.5516°S 151.8316°E
- Country: Australia
- State: Queensland
- City: Toowoomba Region
- LGA: Toowoomba Region
- Location: 17.5 km (10.9 mi) W of Toowoomba CBD; 145 km (90 mi) W of Brisbane CBD

Government
  - State electorate: Condamine
  - Federal division: Groom

Area
  - Total: 48.8 km^{2} (18.8 sq mi)

Population
  - Total: 346 (2021 census)
  - Density: 7.090/km^{2} (18.36/sq mi)
- Time zone: UTC+10:00 (AEST)
- Postcode: 4350
Suburbs around Wellcamp
Kingsthorpe	Gowrie Mountain; Charlton	Torrington
Biddeston	Wellcamp	Glenvale
Biddeston	Westbrook	Westbrook

Wellcamp is a rural locality in the Toowoomba Region, Queensland, Australia. In the 2021 census, Wellcamp had a population of 346 people.

== Geography ==
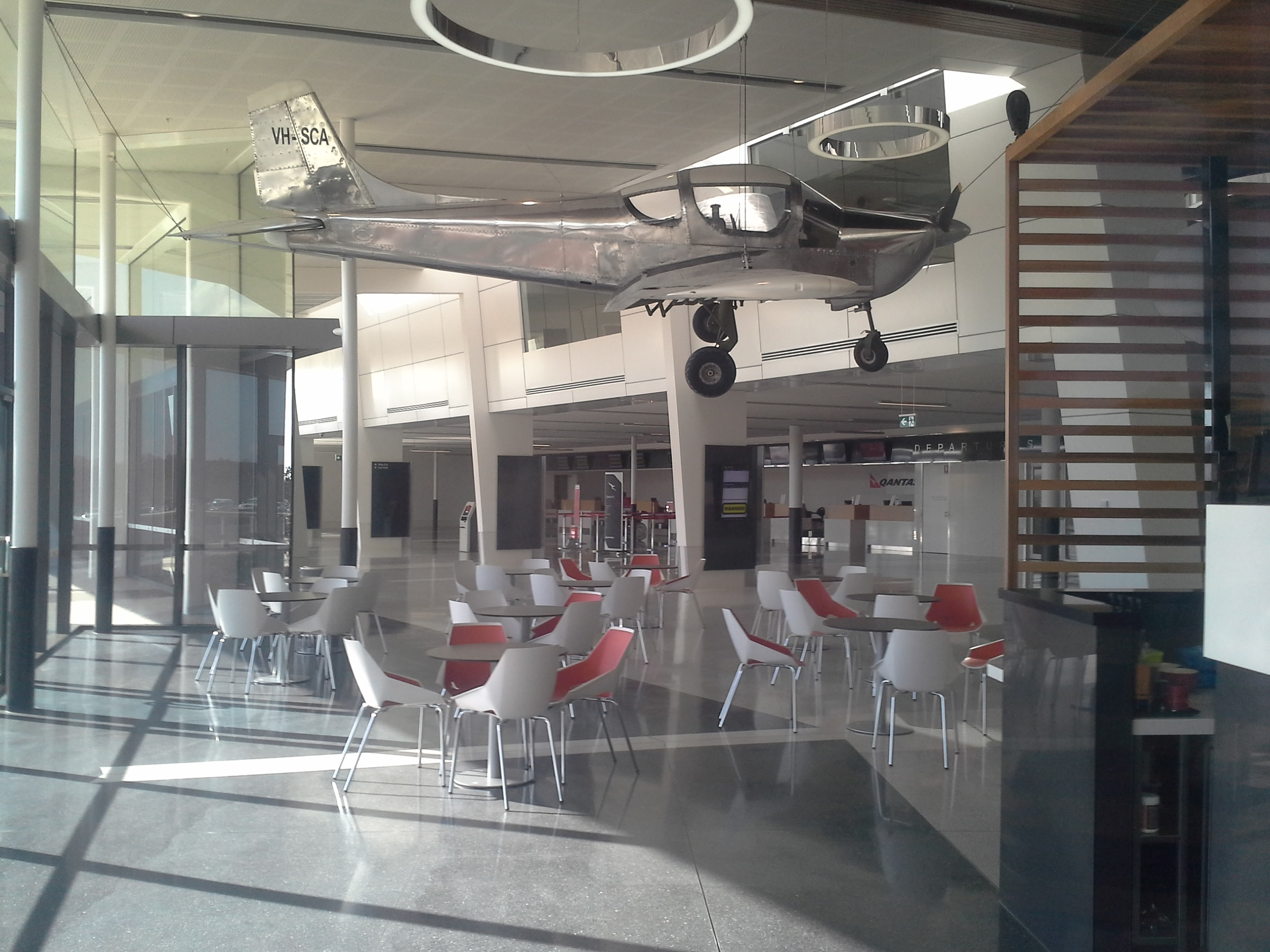
Terminal at Toowoomba Wellcamp airport

Toowoomba Wellcamp Airport is at 1511 Toowoomba-Cecil Plains Road (27.5587°S 151.7955°E). It services Toowoomba and the surrounding districts.

The Toowoomba Bypass passes through the locality from north to south, intersecting with Toowoomba–Cecil Plains Road for access to the Toowoomba Wellcamp Airport and to Cecil Plains.

== History ==
The locality was named by the Queensland Railways after a camp for workers constructing the Toowoomba–Hendon railway, which was beside a well. The line opened to Hendon on 11 March 1869.

Wellcamp Provisional School opened on 27 February 1899. On 1 January 1909, it became Wellcamp State School.

Wellcamp Methodist Church opened on Sunday 5 November 1905. It closed in 1932. It was located south of the Wellcamp State School at 101 Wellcamp Westbrook Road (27.5553°S 151.8507°E).

Wellcamp Airport opened in November 2014. It was built by Toowoomba engineering business Wagners, which owns and operates the airport.

== Demographics ==
In the 2016 census, Wellcamp had a population of 295 people.

In the 2021 census, Wellcamp had a population of 346 people.

== Heritage listings ==
There are a number of heritage-listed sites in Wellcamp:

- Wellcamp State School, 609 Drayton–Wellcamp Road (27.5544°S 151.8509°E)

== Education ==
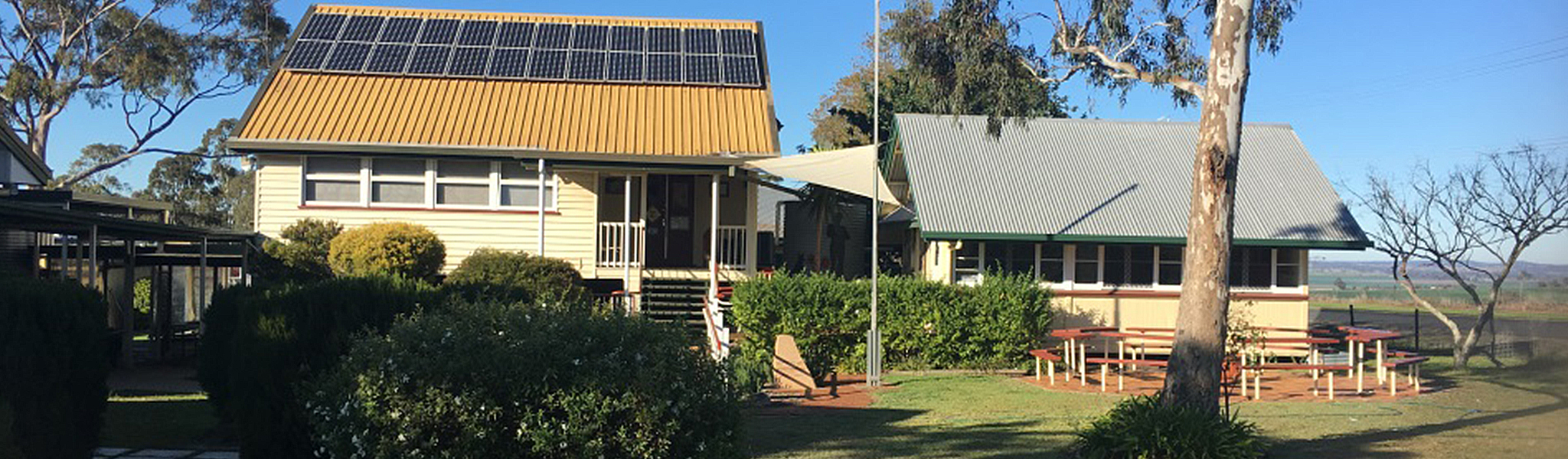
Wellcamp State School, circa 2022

Wellcamp State School is a government primary (Prep–6) school for boys and girls at 609 Drayton–Wellcamp Road (27.5538°S 151.8507°E). In 2017, the school had an enrolment of 77 students with 7 teachers (6 full-time equivalent) and 5 non-teaching staff (3 full-time equivalent). In 2018, the school had an enrolment of 95 students with 8 teachers (6 full-time equivalent) and 5 non-teaching staff (4 full-time equivalent).

There are no government secondary schools in Wellcamp. The nearest government secondary schools are Wilsonton State High School in Wilsonton Heights to the east, Harristown State High School in Harristown to the east, and Oakey State High School in Oakey to the north-west.
