= James Purcell (businessman) =

Australian dairy businessman (1874–1953)

James Purcell (25 November 1874 – 5 November 1953) was an Australian businessman of the early 20th century, mainly active in the dairy industry on the Darling Downs in Queensland.

== Early life ==
Born in the town of Drayton, Purcell assisted his father, a farm-hand, in raising and farming dairy cattle. In 1897, he purchased land of his own near Westbrook and began dairy farming.

== Public roles ==
Purcell was a founding member of The Downs Co-operative Dairy Company Ltd, the Queensland Butter Board, and was a member of the Queensland Dairy Products Stabilisation Board, serving as its chairman from 1930 to 1950, and also served as Vice-President of the Queensland Council of Agriculture. He also served as Chairman of the Clifton Shire Council from 1911 to 1912.

== Later life ==
Purcell died at his home in Toowoomba on 5 November 1953 following a long illness.
