= Kingsthorpe, Queensland =

Kingsthorpe
- Town
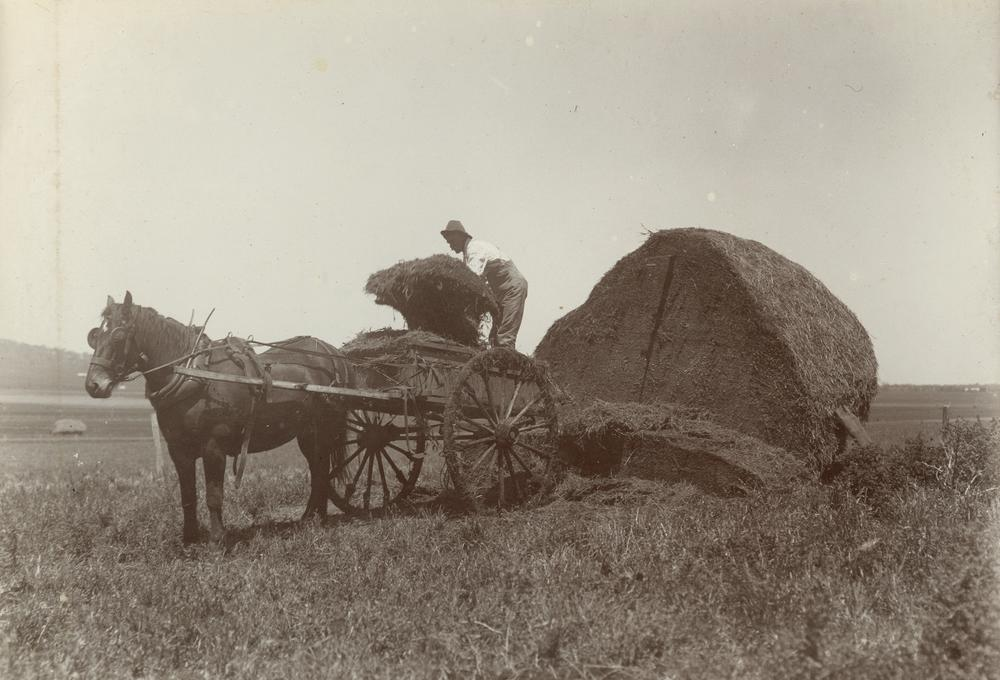
- Loading hay onto the wagon, Kingsthorpe District, cira 1902

- Interactive map of Kingsthorpe
- Coordinates: 27.4758°S 151.8175°E
- Country: Australia
- State: Queensland
- LGA: Toowoomba Region
- Location: 21.4 km (13.3 mi) NW of Toowoomba CBD; 144 km (89 mi) W of Brisbane

Government
  - State electorate: Condamine
  - Federal division: Groom

Area
  - Total: 47.5 km^{2} (18.3 sq mi)

Population
  - Total: 2,159 (2021 census)
  - Density: 45.45/km^{2} (117.72/sq mi)
- Time zone: UTC+10:00 (AEST)
- Postcode: 4400
Localities around Kingsthorpe
Oakey	Kings Siding	Cutella; Glencoe
Oakey	Kingsthorpe	Gowrie Junction; Charlton
Biddeston	Wellcamp	Gowrie Mountain

Kingsthorpe is a rural town and locality in the Toowoomba Region, Queensland, Australia. In the 2021 census, the locality of Kingsthorpe had a population of 2,159 people.

== Geography ==
Kingsthorpe is on the Darling Downs, 21.4 kilometres (13.3 mi) north-west of the Toowoomba CBD and 144 kilometres (89 mi) west of the state capital, Brisbane.

Kingsthorpe railway station on the Western railway line serves the town (27.4783°S 151.8150°E). Kings railway station is a closed station on that line on the boundary between the localities of Kingsthorpe and Kings Siding (27.4648°S 151.7864°E).

== History ==
The town was named after pastoralist brothers Colonel Henry Venn King and George Beresford King, of the Gowrie pastoral property.

St Gregory's Anglican Church in Meringandan was consecrated on Sunday 12 September 1886 by Bishop William Webber. It was located on a 1-acre (0.40 ha) piece of land near the railway station, donated by Mr Foland. It was built by Mr Maag and was 18 by 38 feet (5.5 by 11.6 m) and could seat 150 people. In 1905 it was relocated to Kingsthorpe where it was re-consecrated at St Gregory's by Archbishop St Clair Donaldson on 20 October 1905. The church was closed circa 1982.

Gowrie Mountain Provisional School opened on 30 May 1901, becoming Gowrie Mountain State School on 1 January 1909. It closed in 1967. It was on a 5-acre (2.0 ha) site at 95 Gowrie Mountain School Road (27.5072°S 151.8026°E), formerly within Gowrie Mountain but now within Kingsthorpe.

Kingsthorpe State School opened on 10 July 1911.

Kingsthorpe was in the Shire of Rosalie until 2008, when the shire was amalgamated into the new Toowoomba Region local government area.

== Demographics ==
In the 2011 census, the locality of Kingsthorpe had a population of 1,820 people.

In the 2016 census, the locality of Kingsthorpe had a population of 1,867 people.

In the 2021 census, the locality of Kingsthorpe had a population of 2,159 people.

== Education ==
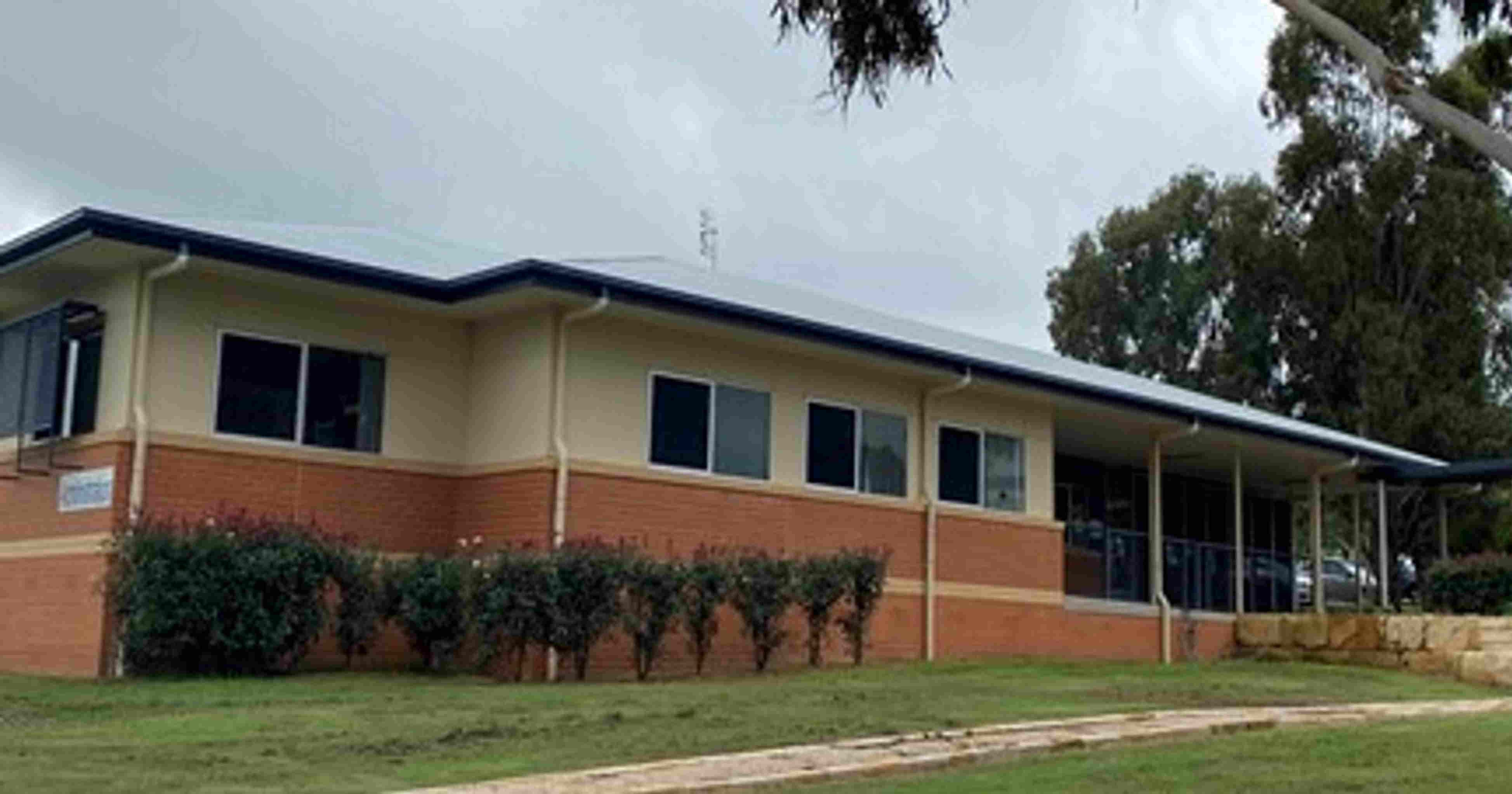
Kingsthorpe State School, 2023

Kingsthorpe State School is a government primary (Prep-6) school for boys and girls at 50 Goombungee Road (27.4719°S 151.8145°E). In 2017, the school had an enrolment of 187 students with 13 teachers (12 full-time equivalent) and 12 non-teaching staff (7 full-time equivalent).

There is no secondary school in Kingsthorpe. The nearest government secondary schools are Oakey State High School in Oakey, Highfields State Secondary College in Highfields, and Wilsonton State High School in Wilsonton Heights (in Toowoomba).

== Amenities ==
Library services in Kingsthorpe are provided by the Toowoomba Regional Council's mobile library service. The van visits Kingsthorpe State School and Kingsthorpe Village Green every Wednesday.

Kingsthorpe features a number of parks with recreation areas, play equipment, and amenities, including Rosalie Walk, Settlers Park, Village Green, and Stoney Ridge Park. The Recreational Reserve has a large sporting oval, tennis courts, picnic facilities with an electric barbeque, and a clubhouse with a canteen and amenities.

The Kingsthorpe branch of the Queensland Country Women's Association meets at 2 Gowrie Street (beside the Kingsthorpe and District Memorial Hall).

== Attractions ==
Mount Kingsthorpe Bushland Reserve is on a hill in the south-east of the locality (27.4799°S 151.8316°E). Rising to 600 metres (2,000 ft), there are expansive views from the top. Access is between 29 and 33 Emmanulla Road.
