= Members of the Queensland Legislative Assembly, 1908–1909 =

This is a list of members of the 17th Legislative Assembly of Queensland from February 1908 to October 1909, as elected at the 1908 state election held on 5 February 1908.

The Philp Ministry did not command a majority on the floor of the Assembly during its short term of government, and the Assembly was dissolved, resulting in gains for both the Kidstonites and Labour, and the return of William Kidston as Premier. However, in late 1908, the two non-Labour parties merged into a new grouping known as the Liberals, also sometimes identified as the Ministerial party (a generic form referring to supporters of the Ministry). As not all members of the original parties supported the new Government, Kidston called another election — the third in 29 months — for 2 October 1909.

Name	Party (pre-1908)	Party (post-1908)	Electorate	Term in office
John Adamson	Labour	Labour	Maryborough	1907–1909; 1911–1917
Peter Airey	Kidston	Opposition	South Brisbane	1901–1907; 1908–1909
Frank Allen^{[1]}	N/A	Labour	Bulloo	1909–1912
John Appel	Conservative	Liberal	Albert	1908–1929
William Drayton Armstrong	Conservative	Liberal	Lockyer	1893–1904; 1907–1918
George Philip Barber	Labour	Labour	Bundaberg	1901–1935
George Powell Barnes	Farmers' Rep.	Liberal	Warwick	1908–1935
Walter Barnes	Conservative	Liberal	Bulimba	1901–1915; 1918–1933
Edward Barton	Kidston	Liberal	Brisbane North	1908–1909
Joshua Thomas Bell	Kidston	Liberal	Dalby	1893–1911
James Blair	Kidston	Opposition	Ipswich	1902–1915
David Bowman	Labour	Labour	Fortitude Valley	1899–1902; 1904–1916
James Brennan	Kidston	Liberal	North Rockhampton	1907–1912
John Dunmore Campbell^{[2]}	Conservative	Liberal	Moreton	1899–1909
Richard John Cottell	Kidston	Liberal	Toowong	1908–1911
Henri Cowap	Kidston	Liberal	Fitzroy	1902–1909
Harry Coyne	Labour	Labour	Warrego	1908–1923
James Cribb	Conservative	Liberal	Bundamba	1893–1896; 1899–1915
Digby Denham	Conservative	Liberal	Oxley	1902–1915
Henry Douglas	Kidston	Opposition	Cook	1907–1915
Edward Barrow Forrest	Conservative	Liberal	Brisbane North	1899–1912
James Forsyth^{[2]}	N/A	Liberal	Moreton	1899–1907; 1909–1918
George Fox	Conservative	Liberal	Normanby	1877–1878; 1901–1914
Kenneth Grant	Kidston	Liberal	Rockhampton	1902–1915
Francis Grayson	Conservative	Liberal	Cunningham	1904–1920
Donald Gunn	Independent	Liberal	Carnarvon	1907–1920
William Hamilton	Labour	Labour	Gregory	1899–1915
Patrick Hanran	Conservative	Liberal	Townsville	1899–1909
Herbert Hardacre	Labour	Labour	Leichhardt	1893–1919
Arthur Hawthorn	Kidston	Liberal	Enoggera	1902–1911
Robert Herbertson	Kidston	Opposition	Port Curtis	1904–1909
David Hunter	Kidston	Liberal	Woolloongabba	1908–1912
John Hunter	Labour	Labour	Maranoa	1907–1919
John Huxham	Labour	Labour	South Brisbane	1908–1909, 1912–1924
George Jackson	Kidston	Liberal	Kennedy	1893–1909
Charles Moffatt Jenkinson	Conservative	Opposition	Fassifern	1898–1902; 1903–1909
Alfred Jones	Labour	Labour	Burnett	1904–1909, 1915–1917, 1922–1932
Francis Kenna	Kidston	Opposition	Bowen	1902–1909
Denis Keogh	Conservative	Liberal	Rosewood	1896–1902; 1904–1911
George Kerr	Kidston	Opposition	Barcoo	1893–1909
William Kidston	Kidston	Liberal	Rockhampton	1896–1911
Edward Land	Labour	Labour	Balonne	1904–1927
John Leahy^{[1]}	Conservative	Liberal	Bulloo	1893–1909
William Lennon	Labour	Labour	Herbert	1907–1920
Vincent Lesina	Labour	Labour	Clermont	1899–1912
Donald MacKintosh	Kidston	Liberal	Cambooya	1899–1915
Peter McLachlan	Labour	Labour	Fortitude Valley	1908–1912, 1915–1920, 1923–1929
John Mann	Kidston	Opposition	Cairns	1904–1912
William Maxwell	Kidston	Liberal	Burke	1899–1909
John May	Labour	Labour	Flinders	1907–1917
William Mitchell	Labour	Labour	Maryborough	1904–1909
William Moore	Conservative	Liberal	Murilla	1898–1904; 1907–1909
Daniel Mulcahy	Labour	Labour	Gympie	1901–1912
John Mullan	Labour	Labour	Charters Towers	1908–1912, 1918–1941
William Murphy	Kidston	Opposition	Croydon	1904–1907; 1908–1918
Thomas Nevitt	Labour	Labour	Carpentaria	1907–1912
Walter Paget	Conservative	Liberal	Mackay	1901–1915
John Payne	Labour	Labour	Mitchell	1905–1928
Andrew Lang Petrie	Conservative	Liberal	Toombul	1893–1926
Robert Philp	Conservative	Liberal	Townsville	1886–1915
Colin Rankin	Kidston	Liberal	Burrum	1905–1918
Vernon Redwood	Kidston	Opposition	Drayton & Toowoomba	1907–1909
Robert Roberts	Kidston	Liberal	Drayton & Toowoomba	1907–1934
George Ryland	Labour	Labour	Gympie	1899–1912
William Ryott Maughan	Labour	Labour	Ipswich	1898–1899; 1904–1912
Henry Plantagenet Somerset	Conservative	Liberal	Stanley	1904–1920
James Stodart	Conservative	Liberal	Logan	1896–1918
Richard Sumner	Kidston	Opposition	Nundah	1907–1909
Edward Swayne	Conservative	Liberal	Mackay	1907–1935
William Thorn	Farmers' Rep.	Liberal	Aubigny	1894–1904; 1908–1912
Harry Walker	Conservative	Liberal	Wide Bay	1907–1947
John White	Conservative	Liberal	Musgrave	1903–1904; 1907–1915
Vern Winstanley	Labour	Labour	Charters Towers	1908–1932
Michael Woods	Kidston	Opposition	Woothakata	1902–1909

^{1} On 20 January 1909, John Leahy, the Liberal member for Bulloo, died. Labour candidate Frank Allen won the resulting by-election on 27 March 1909.
^{2} On 27 May 1909, John Dunmore Campbell, the Liberal member for Moreton, died. Liberal candidate James Forsyth won the resulting by-election on 19 June 1909.

== See also ==
- 1908 Queensland state election
- Second Kidston Ministry (Kidston/Liberal) (1908–1911)
