= Second Kidston ministry =

The Second Kidston Ministry was the 25th ministry of the Government of Queensland and was led by Premier William Kidston. It succeeded the Second Philp Ministry on 18 February 1908, 13 days after the 1908 state election. The ministry was followed by the Denham Ministry on 7 February 1911 following Kidston's retirement from politics.

At first the ministry represented only his own "Kidstonites" party, but from October 1908 reflected a merger of that party with Robert Philp's conservative party as Kidston had concluded that co-operation with the Labour Party was no longer possible.

== First ministry ==
On 18 February 1908 the Governor, the Rt Hon Viscount Chelmsford, designated eight principal executive offices of the Government, and appointed the following Members of the Parliament of Queensland to the Ministry as follows:

Office	Minister
Premier; Chief Secretary	William Kidston
Deputy Premier; Secretary for Public Instruction	Andrew Henry Barlow, MLC
Attorney-General; Secretary for Mines	James Blair
Secretary for Public Lands	Joshua Thomas Bell
Treasurer	Peter Airey
Secretary for Agriculture	Thomas O'Sullivan, MLC
Home Secretary	Arthur Hawthorn
Secretary for Railways; Secretary for Public Works	George Kerr

== Second ministry ==
Following the merger of the Kidston and Philp parties, a new ministry was formed on 29 October 1908.

Office	Minister
Premier; Chief Secretary	William Kidston
Deputy Premier; Secretary for Public Instruction	Andrew Henry Barlow, MLC
Home Secretary	Joshua Thomas Bell
Secretary for Public Lands	Digby Denham
Attorney-General	Thomas O'Sullivan, MLC
Treasurer	Arthur Hawthorn
Secretary for Mines; Secretary for Public Works	John Appel
Secretary for Railways; Secretary for Agriculture	Walter Paget

== Third ministry ==
Another major reshuffle took place on 22 June 1909. One junior minister, George Jackson, subsequently lost his parliamentary seat at the 1909 state election, necessitating the reshuffle of his portfolios on 22 October 1909.

Office	Minister
Premier; Chief Secretary	William Kidston
Deputy Premier; Secretary for Public Lands	Digby Denham
Attorney-General	Thomas O'Sullivan, MLC
Treasurer	Arthur Hawthorn
Secretary for Public Instruction; Secretary for Public Works (from 22 October 1909)	Walter Barnes
Home Secretary; Secretary for Mines (from 22 October 1909)	John Appel
Secretary for Agriculture and Stock; Secretary for Railways	Walter Paget
Secretary for Mines; Secretary for Public Works	George Jackson (29 June 1909 – 22 October 1909)
Minister without portfolio	Andrew Henry Barlow, MLC

Preceded by Philp Ministry	Second Kidston Ministry; 1908–1911	Succeeded by Denham Ministry
