= Members of the Queensland Legislative Assembly, 1907–1908 =

This is a list of members of the 16th Legislative Assembly of Queensland from May 1907 to February 1908, as elected at the 1907 state election held on 18 May 1907.

The Kidstonites, led by Premier William Kidston in the days before organised political parties and consisting of former Labour and Liberal MPs, won the election; however, Kidston resigned his commission in protest at the Governor's refusal to appoint more members to the Queensland Legislative Council in order to facilitate the passage of key reform measures. The Conservative Opposition leader, Robert Philp, was commissioned to form a government, but it could not command a majority on the floor of the Assembly, and ultimately the Assembly was dissolved and another election called.

Name	Party	Electorate	Term in office
John Adamson	Labour	Maryborough	1907–1909; 1911–1917
William Drayton Armstrong	Conservative	Lockyer	1893–1904; 1907–1918
George Philip Barber	Labour	Bundaberg	1901–1935
Hon Walter Barnes	Conservative	Bulimba	1901–1915; 1918–1933
Hon Joshua Thomas Bell	Kidston	Dalby	1893–1911
Hon James Blair	Kidston	Ipswich	1902–1915
George Blocksidge	Conservative	Woolloongabba	1907–1908
David Bowman	Labour	Fortitude Valley	1899–1902; 1904–1916
Thomas Bouchard	Conservative	South Brisbane	1904–1908; 1909–1915
James Brennan	Kidston	North Rockhampton	1907–1912
John Cameron	Conservative	Brisbane North	1893–1896; 1901–1908
Vincent Creagh	Conservative/Independent	Croydon	1907–1908
Hon John Dunmore Campbell	Conservative	Moreton	1899–1909
Henri Cowap	Kidston	Fitzroy	1902–1909
James Cribb	Conservative	Bundamba	1893–1896; 1899–1915
Hon Digby Denham	Conservative	Oxley	1902–1915
Henry Douglas	Kidston	Cook	1907–1908; 1908–1915
Edward Barrow Forrest	Conservative	Brisbane North	1899–1912
George Fox	Conservative	Normanby	1877–1878; 1901–1914
Kenneth Grant	Kidston	Rockhampton	1902–1915
Francis Grayson	Kidston/Conservative	Cunningham	1904–1920
Donald Gunn	Independent	Carnarvon	1907–1920
William Hamilton	Labour	Gregory	1899–1915
Patrick Hanran	Conservative	Townsville	1899–1909
Herbert Hardacre	Labour	Leichhardt	1893–1919
Hon Arthur Hawthorn	Kidston	Enoggera	1902–1911
Robert Herbertson	Kidston	Port Curtis	1904–1909
John Hunter	Labour	Maranoa	1907–1919
George Jackson	Kidston	Kennedy	1893–1909
Charles Moffatt Jenkinson	Conservative	Fassifern	1898–1902; 1903–1909
Alfred Jones	Labour	Burnett	1904–1909, 1915–1917, 1922–1932
Francis Kenna	Kidston	Bowen	1902–1909
Denis Keogh	Conservative	Rosewood	1896–1902; 1904–1911
Hon George Kerr	Kidston	Barcoo	1893–1909
Hon William Kidston	Kidston	Rockhampton	1896–1911
Edward Land	Labour	Balonne	1904–1927
John Leahy	Conservative	Bulloo	1893–1909
Hon Patrick Leahy	Conservative	Warrego	1902–1908
William Lennon	Labour	Herbert	1907–1920
Vincent Lesina	Labour	Clermont	1899–1912
Edward Macartney	Conservative	Toowong	1900–1908; 1909–1920
Donald McIntyre	Kidston	Aubigny	1907–1908
Donald MacKintosh	Kidston	Cambooya	1899–1915
John McMaster	Conservative	Fortitude Valley	1885–1899; 1901–1904; 1907–1908
John Mann	Kidston	Cairns	1904–1912
William Maxwell	Kidston	Burke	1899–1909
John May	Labour	Flinders	1907–1917
Joe Millican	Conservative	Charters Towers	1907–1908
William Mitchell	Labour	Maryborough	1904–1909
William Moore	Conservative	Murilla	1898–1904; 1907–1909
Daniel Mulcahy	Labour	Gympie	1901–1912
Thomas Nevitt	Labour	Carpentaria	1907–1912
Hon Thomas O'Sullivan	Kidston	Warwick	1906–1908
Walter Paget	Conservative	Mackay	1901–1915
William Paull	Conservative	Charters Towers	1905–1908
John Payne	Labour	Mitchell	1905–1928
Andrew Lang Petrie	Conservative	Toombul	1893–1926
Hon Robert Philp	Conservative	Townsville	1886–1915
Thomas Plunkett	Kidston	Albert	1888–1896; 1899–1908
Colin Rankin	Kidston	Burrum	1905–1918
Vernon Redwood	Kidston	Drayton & Toowoomba	1907–1909
Robert Roberts	Kidston	Drayton & Toowoomba	1907–1934
George Ryland	Labour	Gympie	1899–1912
William Ryott Maughan	Labour	Ipswich	1898–1899; 1904–1912
Henry Plantagenet Somerset	Conservative	Stanley	1904–1920
Hon William Stephens	Conservative	South Brisbane	1888–1904; 1907–1908
James Stodart	Conservative	Logan	1896–1918
Richard Sumner	Kidston	Nundah	1907–1909
Edward Swayne	Conservative	Mackay	1907–1935
Harry Walker	Conservative	Wide Bay	1907–1947
John White	Conservative	Musgrave	1903–1904; 1907–1915
Michael Woods	Kidston	Woothakata	1902–1909

== See also ==
- 1907 Queensland state election
- First Kidston Ministry (Kidston) (1906–1907)
- Second Philp Ministry (Conservative) (Nov 1907–Feb 1908)
