= First Kidston ministry =

The First Kidston Ministry was the 23rd ministry of the Government of Queensland and was led by Premier William Kidston, who led a Labour–Liberal coalition. It succeeded the Morgan ministry on 19 January 1906 upon the appointment of Arthur Morgan as president of the Queensland Legislative Council. The Labour Party split in 1907, with Kidston and several other moderate Labour members combining with the remaining Liberals in a new party, the "Kidstonites".

Despite maintaining the confidence of the Legislative Assembly at the 1907 election, the Ministry fell when Kidston resigned on 12 November 1907 after failing to have sympathetic members appointed to the Council. It was succeeded by the short-lived Second Philp ministry headed by his conservative opponent Robert Philp on 19 November.

== The Ministry ==
On 19 January 1906, the Governor, Lord Chelmsford, designated eight principal executive offices of the Government, and appointed the following Members of the Parliament of Queensland to the Ministry as follows. On 4 February 1907, Digby Denham left the Ministry and joined the opposition Conservative party. Peter Airey lost his parliamentary seat at the 1907 election held on 18 May 1907, but was retained as a minister without portfolio from 3 July 1907.

Office	Minister
Premier; Chief Secretary; Treasurer	William Kidston
Deputy Premier; Secretary for Public Instruction	Andrew Henry Barlow, MLC
Attorney-General; Secretary for Mines	James Blair
Secretary for Public Lands; Secretary for Railways (6 February – 3 July 1907)	Joshua Thomas Bell
Secretary for Agriculture; Secretary for Railways	Digby Denham (until 4 February 1907)
Home Secretary (until 3 July 1907); Minister without portfolio (from 3 July 1907)	Peter Airey
Secretary for Public Works; Secretary for Agriculture (from 6 February 1907)	Thomas O'Sullivan
Home Secretary	Arthur Hawthorn (from 3 July 1907)
Secretary for Railways	George Kerr (from 3 July 1907)

Preceded by Morgan ministry	First Kidston ministry 1906–1907	Succeeded by Second Philp ministry
