= Leader of the Opposition (Queensland) =

Australian political position

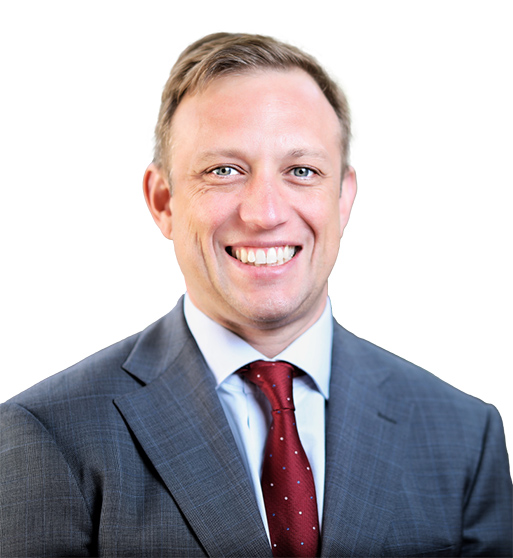
- Incumbent; Steven Miles since 28 October 2024
- Member of: Legislative Assembly
- Term length: While leader of the largest political party not in government
- Inaugural holder: Thomas Glassey
- Formation: 30 August 1898 (official designation)
- Deputy: Cameron Dick, Deputy Leader of the Opposition

The leader of the opposition in Queensland is the leader of the largest minority political party or coalition of parties, known as the Opposition, in the Parliament of Queensland. Prior to 1898, opposition to the government of the day was less organised. Thus the Queensland Parliamentary Record does not designate leaders of the opposition before then. The leader is responsible for managing the Opposition and has a role in administering the Legislative Assembly through the Committee of the Legislative Assembly.

== List of leaders of the opposition ==
No.	Name	Portrait	Affiliation	Constituency	Term of office		Elections	Premier
1	Thomas Glassey		Labor	Bundaberg	30 August 1898	12 May 1899	–	Byrnes; 1898
1	Thomas Glassey		Labor	Bundaberg	30 August 1898	12 May 1899	1899	Dickson; 1898–1899
2	Anderson Dawson		Labor	Charters Towers	12 May 1899	1 December 1899	–	Dickson; 1898–1899
3	Robert Philp		Ministerial	Townsville	1 December 1899	7 December 1899	–	Dawson; 1899
(2)	Anderson Dawson		Labor	Charters Towers	7 December 1899	16 July 1900	–	Philp; 1899–1903
4	W. H. Browne		Labor	Croydon	16 July 1900	17 September 1903	1902	Philp; 1899–1903
(3)	Robert Philp		Conservative	Townsville	17 September 1903	28 June 1904	–	Morgan; 1903–1906
5	Arthur Rutledge		Conservative	Maranoa	28 June 1904	27 August 1904	1904	Morgan; 1903–1906
(3)	Robert Philp		Conservative	Townsville	19 September 1904	19 November 1907	–	Morgan; 1903–1906
(3)	Robert Philp		Conservative	Townsville	19 September 1904	19 November 1907	–	Kidston; 1906–1907
(3)	Robert Philp		Conservative	Townsville	19 September 1904	19 November 1907	1907	Kidston; 1906–1907
6	William Kidston		Kidstonites	Rockhampton	19 November 1907	15 February 1908	1908	Philp; 1907–1908
(3)	Robert Philp		Conservative	Townsville	15 February 1908	29 October 1908	–	Kidston; 1908–1911
7	David Bowman		Labor	Fortitude Valley	16 November 1908	6 September 1912	1909	Kidston; 1908–1911
7	David Bowman		Labor	Fortitude Valley	16 November 1908	6 September 1912	1912	Denham; 1911–1915
8	T. J. Ryan		Labor	Barcoo	6 September 1912	22 May 1915	1915	Denham; 1911–1915
9	Edward Macartney		Liberal	Toowong	24 June 1915	8 September 1915	–	Ryan; 1915–1919
10	James Tolmie		Liberal	Toowoomba	8 September 1915	15 February 1918	–	Ryan; 1915–1919
10	James Tolmie		National	Toowoomba	8 September 1915	15 February 1918	–	Ryan; 1915–1919
(9)	Edward Macartney		National	Toowong	15 February 1918	28 January 1920	1918	Ryan; 1915–1919
(9)	Edward Macartney		National	Toowong	15 February 1918	28 January 1920	–	Theodore; 1919–1925
11	William Vowles		National	Dalby	28 January 1920	11 July 1923	–	Theodore; 1919–1925
11	William Vowles		Country	Dalby	28 January 1920	11 July 1923	1920; 1923	Theodore; 1919–1925
12	Charles Taylor		United	Windsor	11 July 1923	19 April 1924	–	Theodore; 1919–1925
13	Arthur Edward Moore		Country	Aubigny	19 April 1924	11 May 1929	–	Theodore; 1919–1925
13	Arthur Edward Moore		Country	Aubigny	19 April 1924	11 May 1929	–	Gillies; 1925
13	Arthur Edward Moore		CPNP	Aubigny	19 April 1924	11 May 1929	1926	McCormack; 1925–1929
14	William Forgan Smith		Labor	Mackay	27 May 1929	11 June 1932	1932	Moore; 1929–1932
(13)	Arthur Edward Moore		CPNP	Aubigny	15 August 1932	15 July 1936	1935	Forgan Smith; 1932–1942
(13)	Arthur Edward Moore		Country	Aubigny	15 August 1932	15 July 1936	–	Forgan Smith; 1932–1942
15	Ted Maher		Country	West Moreton	15 July 1936	21 May 1941	1938; 1941	Forgan Smith; 1932–1942
16	Frank Nicklin		Country	Murrumba; Landsborough	21 May 1941	15 August 1957	–	Forgan Smith; 1932–1942
16	Frank Nicklin		Country	Murrumba; Landsborough	21 May 1941	15 August 1957	1944	Cooper; 1942–1946
16	Frank Nicklin		Country	Murrumba; Landsborough	21 May 1941	15 August 1957	1947; 1950	Hanlon; 1946–1952
16	Frank Nicklin		Country	Murrumba; Landsborough	21 May 1941	15 August 1957	1953; 1956	Gair; 1952–1957
16	Frank Nicklin		Country	Murrumba; Landsborough	21 May 1941	15 August 1957	1957	Gair; 1952–1957
17	Les Wood		Labor	North Toowoomba	15 August 1957	14 April 1958	–	Nicklin; 1957–1968
18	Jim Donald		Labor	Bremer	14 April 1958	18 August 1958	–	Nicklin; 1957–1968
19	Jack Duggan		Labor	North Toowoomba; Toowoomba West	18 August 1958	12 October 1966	1960; 1963; 1966	Nicklin; 1957–1968
20	Jack Houston		Labor	Bulimba	12 October 1966	1 July 1974	–	Nicklin; 1957–1968
20	Jack Houston		Labor	Bulimba	12 October 1966	1 July 1974	–	Pizzey; 1968
20	Jack Houston		Labor	Bulimba	12 October 1966	1 July 1974	–	Chalk; 1968
20	Jack Houston		Labor	Bulimba	12 October 1966	1 July 1974	1969; 1972	Bjelke-Petersen; 1968–1987
21	Perc Tucker		Labor	Townsville West	1 July 1974	19 December 1974	1974	Bjelke-Petersen; 1968–1987
22	Tom Burns		Labor	Lytton	19 December 1974	28 November 1978	1977	Bjelke-Petersen; 1968–1987
23	Ed Casey		Labor	Mackay	28 November 1978	20 October 1982	1980	Bjelke-Petersen; 1968–1987
24	Keith Wright		Labor	Rockhampton	20 October 1982	29 August 1984	1983	Bjelke-Petersen; 1968–1987
25	Nev Warburton		Labor	Sandgate	29 August 1984	2 March 1988	1986	Bjelke-Petersen; 1968–1987
25	Nev Warburton		Labor	Sandgate	29 August 1984	2 March 1988	–	Ahern; 1987–1989
26	Wayne Goss		Labor	Logan	2 March 1988	2 December 1989	–	Ahern; 1987–1989
26	Wayne Goss		Labor	Logan	2 March 1988	2 December 1989	1989	Cooper; 1989
27	Russell Cooper		National	Roma	2 December 1989	9 December 1991	–	Goss; 1989–1996
28	Rob Borbidge		National	Surfers Paradise	10 December 1991	19 February 1996	1992; 1995	Goss; 1989–1996
29	Peter Beattie		Labor	Brisbane Central	19 February 1996	29 June 1998	1998	Borbidge; 1996–1998
(28)	Rob Borbidge		National	Surfers Paradise	29 June 1998	2 March 2001	2001	Beattie; 1998–2007
30	Mike Horan		National	Toowoomba South	2 March 2001	4 February 2003	–	Beattie; 1998–2007
31	Lawrence Springborg		National	Southern Downs	4 February 2003	18 September 2006	2004; 2006	Beattie; 1998–2007
32	Jeff Seeney		National	Callide	18 September 2006	29 January 2008	–	Beattie; 1998–2007
32	Jeff Seeney		National	Callide	18 September 2006	29 January 2008	–	Bligh; 2007–2012
(31)	Lawrence Springborg		National	Southern Downs	29 January 2008	2 April 2009	2009	Bligh; 2007–2012
(31)	Lawrence Springborg		Liberal National	Southern Downs	29 January 2008	2 April 2009		Bligh; 2007–2012
33	John-Paul Langbroek		Liberal National	Surfers Paradise	2 April 2009	22 March 2011	–	Bligh; 2007–2012
(32)	Jeff Seeney^{1}		Liberal National	Callide	22 March 2011	28 March 2012	2012	Bligh; 2007–2012
34	Annastacia Palaszczuk		Labor	Inala	28 March 2012	14 February 2015	2015	Newman; 2012–2015
(31)	Lawrence Springborg		Liberal National	Southern Downs	14 February 2015	6 May 2016	–	Palaszczuk; 2015–2023
35	Tim Nicholls		Liberal National	Clayfield	6 May 2016	12 December 2017	2017	Palaszczuk; 2015–2023
36	Deb Frecklington		Liberal National	Nanango	12 December 2017	12 November 2020	2020	Palaszczuk; 2015–2023
37	David Crisafulli		Liberal National	Broadwater	12 November 2020	28 October 2024	–	Palaszczuk; 2015–2023
37	David Crisafulli		Liberal National	Broadwater	12 November 2020	28 October 2024	2024	Miles; 2023–2024
38	Steven Miles		Labor	Murrumba	28 October 2024	incumbent	–	Crisafulli; 2024–present

Notes

^{1} On 2 April 2011, Campbell Newman was elected to lead the LNP into the 2012 Queensland state election, but was not recognised as the leader of the opposition as he was not a Member of Parliament during the 53rd Parliament.
