= Denham ministry =

The Denham Ministry was the 26th ministry of the Government of Queensland and was led by Premier Digby Denham, who led the Ministerialist party consisting of a mixture of liberals and conservatives. It succeeded the Kidston Ministry on 7 February 1911. The ministry was followed by the Ryan Ministry on 1 June 1915 after the government was defeated by the Labor Party at the 1915 state election on 22 May, at which several of the ministers including Denham himself lost their seats.

On 7 February 1911, the Governor, Sir William MacGregor, designated eight principal executive offices of the Government, and appointed the following Members of the Parliament of Queensland to the Ministry as follows:

| Office | Minister |
|---|---|
| Premier; Chief Secretary | Digby Denham |
| Deputy Premier; Attorney-General | Thomas O'Sullivan, MLC |
| Treasurer; Secretary for Public Works | Walter Barnes |
| Home Secretary; Secretary for Mines | John Appel^{[1]} (until 26 February 1915) |
| Secretary for Railways | Walter Paget (until 6 April 1915) |
| Secretary for Public Instruction | James Blair (from 3 September 1912) |
| Secretary for Public Instruction (until 3 September 1912) (from 26 February 1915:) Home Secretary Secretary for Mines | Kenneth Grant |
| Secretary for Public Lands | Edward Macartney (until 11 December 1912) |
| Secretary for Agriculture and Stock (until 11 December 1912); Secretary for Public Lands (from 11 December 1912) | James Tolmie |
| Secretary for Agriculture and Stock | John White (from 11 December 1912) |
| Secretary for Railways | Colin Rankin (from 6 April 1915) |
| Minister without portfolio | Andrew Henry Barlow (until 29 March 1915); Henry Douglas (from 6 April 1915) |

^{1} John Appel resigned from the Ministry after aligning with the new Farmers' Union party. Kenneth Grant, a former minister, was appointed in his place.

| Preceded by Kidston Ministry | Denham Ministry; 1911–1915 | Succeeded by Ryan Ministry |
