= Second Philp ministry =

The Second Philp Ministry was the 24th ministry of the Government of Queensland and was led by Premier Robert Philp, who led the Conservative party. It succeeded the Second Kidston ministry on 19 November 1907 following Kidston's resignation on 12 November 1907. The Ministry lost a vote of no-confidence in the Legislative Assembly by 37 to 29 on its first day, and Philp asked for and obtained a dissolution of Parliament. At the 5 February 1908 election, the Conservative party lost seven Assembly seats including those of two of the ministers (Leahy and Stephens), and on 14 February Philp resigned. The Ministry formally concluded on 18 February 1908, and was succeeded by the Second Kidston ministry.

== The Ministry ==
On 19 November 1907, the Governor, Lord Chelmsford, designated eight principal executive offices of the Government, and appointed the following Members of the Parliament of Queensland to the Ministry as follows:

Office	Minister
Premier; Chief Secretary; Treasurer	Robert Philp
Deputy Premier; Home Secretary	Digby Denham
Secretary for Public Lands	Walter Barnes
Secretary for Railways	John Dunmore Campbell
Secretary for Public Works; Secretary for Mines	Patrick Leahy
Minister for Justice^{[1]}	Francis Power, MLC
Secretary for Agriculture; Secretary for Public Instruction	William Stephens
Minister without portfolio	William Villiers Brown, MLC

^{1} The Minister of Justice fulfilled all duties usually performed by the Attorney-General.

Preceded by First Kidston ministry	Philp Ministry; 1907–1908	Succeeded by Second Kidston ministry
