= 1915 Queensland state election =

- 22 May 1915

All 72 seats in the Legislative Assembly of Queensland 37 Assembly seats were needed for a majority
- Registered: 302,061
- Turnout: 88.14 (▲12.62 pp)
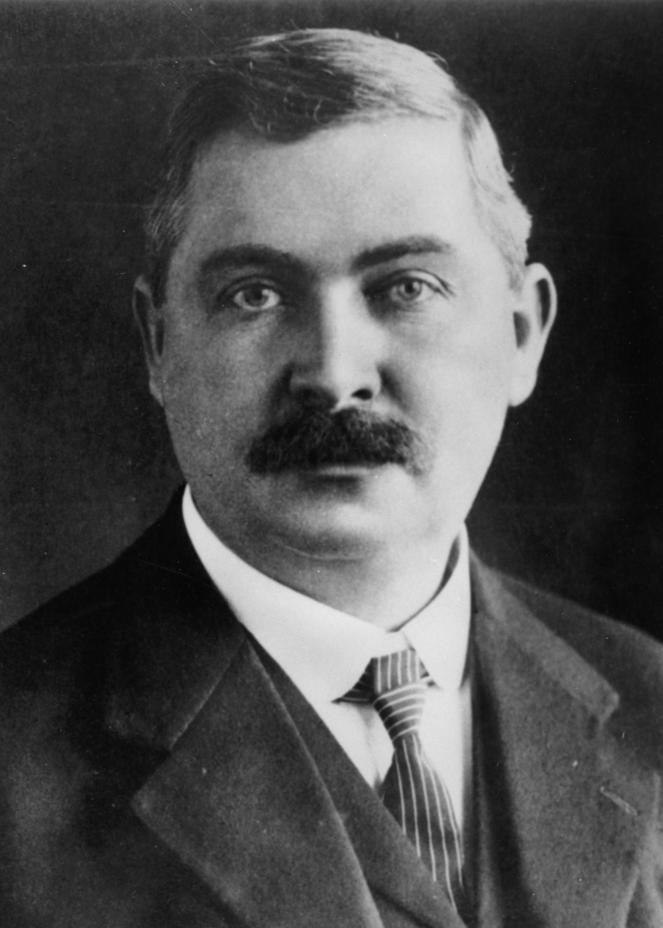

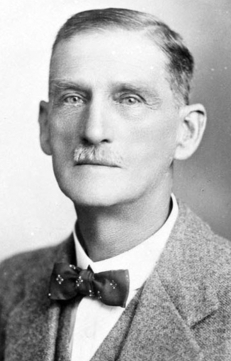
| | First party | Second party | Third party |
|---|---|---|---|
| | | | FU |
| Leader | T. J. Ryan | Digby Denham | No leader |
| Party | Labor | Liberal | Farmers' Union |
| Leader since | 6 September 1912 | 7 February 1911 | N/A |
| Leader's seat | Barcoo | Oxley (lost seat) | N/A |
| Last election | 25 seats, 46.70% | 46 seats, 51.37% | Did not contest |
| Seats won | 45 | 21 | 5 |
| Seat change | ▲20 | ▼25 | ▲5 |
| Popular vote | 136,419 | 109,985 | 13,233 |
| Percentage | 52.06% | 41.97% | 5.05% |
| Swing | ▲5.36 | ▼4.73 | ▲5.05 |
- Legislative Assembly after the election
Premier before election
Digby Denham
Liberal
Elected Premier
T. J. Ryan
Labor

Elections were held in the Australian state of Queensland on 22 May 1915 to elect the 72 members of the state's Legislative Assembly.

The election was the second for the Liberal government of Digby Denham, who had been premier since 7 February 1911. The opposition Labor Party, led by T. J. Ryan, had two previous Premiers — Anderson Dawson in 1899 and William Kidston in 1906 — but the former did not command a majority of parliamentary support, while the latter maintained it by splitting the Labor Party. Labor had never before held majority government.

The election was the first in Australia to be conducted using compulsory voting due to Denham's concern that Trade Unions were effectively mobilising the ALP vote; he felt that compulsory voting would ensure a more level playing field. However, it turned out that the change to compulsory voting was not enough to save Denham's premiership.

The election resulted in the defeat of the government, and Queensland's first majority Labor government. All except two members of the Ministry up for election, including Denham himself, lost their seats.

== Key dates ==
| Date | Event |
|---|---|
| 15 April 1915 | The Parliament was dissolved. |
| 15 April 1915 | Writs were issued by the Governor to proceed with an election. |
| 28 April 1915 | Close of nominations. |
| 22 May 1915 | Polling day, between the hours of 8am and 6pm. |
| 1 June 1915 | The Denham Ministry resigned and the Ryan Ministry was sworn in. |
| 21 June 1915 | The writ was returned and the results formally declared. |
| 13 July 1915 | Parliament resumed for business. |

== Results ==
The election saw a landslide to Labor from the 1912 election.

Queensland state election, 22 May 1915 Legislative Assembly << 1912–1918 >>
| Enrolled voters | 302,061^{[1]} | | | | |
| Votes cast | 266,240 | | Turnout | 88.14 | +12.62 |
| Informal votes | 4,188 | | Informal | 1.57 | +0.38 |
Summary of votes by party
| Party | Primary votes | % | Swing | Seats | Change |
| Labor | 136,419 | 52.06 | +5.36 | 45 | +20 |
| Liberals | 109,985 | 41.97 | –4.73 | 21 | –25 |
| Farmers' Union | 13,233 | 5.05 | +5.05 | 5 | + 5 |
| Independent | 2,415 | 0.92 | –0.82 | 1 | ± 0 |
| Total | 262,052 | | | 72 | |

^{1} 335,195 electors were enrolled to vote at the election, but 8 seats (11.1% of the total) were uncontested—6 Labor seats representing 24,564 enrolled voters, one Liberal seat representing 3,999 voters, and one Farmers' Union seat representing 4,571 voters.

== Seats changing party representation ==
This table lists changes in party representation at the 1915 election.

| Seat | Incumbent member | Party | New member | Party |
|---|---|---|---|---|
| Albert | John Appel | Liberal | John Appel | Farmers' Union |
| Aubigny | Alfred Luke | Liberal | Arthur Moore | Farmers' Union |
| Bowen | Edwin Caine | Liberal | Charles Collins | Labor |
| Bremer | James Cribb | Liberal | Frank Cooper | Labor |
| Bulimba | Walter Barnes | Liberal | Hugh McMinn | Labor |
| Charters Towers | Robert Williams | Liberal | William Wellington | Labor |
| Cook | Henry Douglas | Liberal | Henry Ryan | Labor |
| Drayton | William Bebbington | Liberal | William Bebbington | Farmers' Union |
| Enoggera | Richard Trout | Liberal | William Lloyd | Labor |
| Fitzroy | Kenneth Grant | Liberal | Harry Hartley | Labor |
| Gympie | George Mackay | Liberal | Thomas Dunstan | Labor |
| Ipswich | James Blair | Liberal | David Gledson | Labor |
| Kurilpa | James Allan | Liberal | William Hartley | Labor |
| Mackay | Walter Paget | Liberal | William Smith | Labor |
| Maryborough | Edward Corser | Liberal | Alfred Jones | Labor |
| Merthyr | Thomas Welsby | Liberal | Peter McLachlan | Labor |
| Mount Morgan | James Crawford | Liberal | James Stopford | Labor |
| Musgrave | John White | Liberal | Thomas Armfield | Labor |
| Nanango | Robert Hodge | Liberal | Robert Hodge | Farmers' Union |
| Normanby | Edward Archer | Liberal | Jens Peterson | Labor |
| Oxley | Digby Denham | Liberal | Thomas Jones | Labor |
| Pittsworth | Donald Mackintosh | Liberal | Percy Bayley | Farmers' Union |
| Port Curtis | John Kessell | Liberal | George Carter | Labor |
| South Brisbane | Thomas Bouchard | Liberal | Edgar Free | Labor |
| Townsville | Robert Philp | Liberal | Daniel Ryan | Labor |
| Windsor | Hugh Macrossan | Liberal | Herbert McPhail | Labor |

- Members listed in italics did not recontest their seats.

== Aftermath ==
This was the start of a period of Labor hegemony over the Assembly which lasted until 1957; the only breach was the Moore ministry of the 1929–1932 period.

== See also ==
- Candidates of the Queensland state election, 1915
- Members of the Queensland Legislative Assembly, 1912–1915
- Members of the Queensland Legislative Assembly, 1915–1918
- Denham Ministry
- Ryan Ministry
