= Liberal Party (Queensland, 1908) =

Defunct political party in Queensland, Australia

- Leader: William Kidston (1908-1911); Digby Denham (1911-1915); Edward Macartney (1915); James Tolmie (1915-1917)
- Founded: 1908
- Dissolved: 1917
- Merger of: Conservative Party; Kidstonites
- Merged into: National Party
- Ideology: Liberalism (Australian); Liberal conservatism
- Political position: Centre-right

The Liberal Party was a political party in the Australian state of Queensland in the early 20th century. It combined the main non-Labor forces, the Kidstonites of William Kidston and the Conservative Party led by Robert Philp, similar to the federal Commonwealth Liberal Party whose fusion it preceded. The Liberals held government from their formation in 1908 until defeat in 1915 after which they combined with other elements in the state to form the National Party.

== History ==
The Liberals were formed after a period of flux in Queensland state politics in which multiple parties and factions had operated with both the 1907 and 1908 elections returning Legislative Assemblies with three groupings of approximately equal weight. William Kidston had served as Premier of Queensland since 1906, breaking with the Labor Party in 1907 to form his own "Kidstonites" grouping. The Kidstonites initially governed with the external support of Labor but in the two broke over bills on private railway construction which relied on the support of Robert Philp's Conservative faction. Increasingly the Kidstonites and the Conservatives were drawn together and, following a trip by Kidston to the United Kingdom, in October 1908 the two groups merged; this merger preceded the similar federal merger of anti-Labor forces as the Commonwealth Liberal Party by seven months. However not all of the Kidstonite MLAs accepted the merger, and a group called the "Independent Opposition" emerged, headed by former Attorney General James Blair and including former Labor leaders Peter Airey and George Kerr. The fused party revived the name "Liberals", previously used by the followers of Samuel Griffith, Premier in the 1880s & 1890s.

Kidston became leader of the new party whilst Philp retired to the backbenches, although other prominent followers of his such as Digby Denham served in the cabinet. The new party governed for a year before another state election at which they increased their number of seats whilst the Independent Opposition was reduced to a small remnant. The government pushed further reforms including electoral reform based on reasonably equal sized electorates and the consolidation & simplification of land legislation. In early 1911 Kidston retired from politics, to be succeeded by Denham. The same year saw the creation of the People's Progressive League, an extra-parliamentary organisation to support the government.

Under Denham the party faced a number of divisions. Rural Liberals organised internally as the Farmers' Parliamentary Union, expressing discontent that would later boil over and lead to the emergence of a separate party. A liquor bill was blocked by the Queensland Legislative Council in 1911 and a major constitutional crisis and split in the Liberals was only averted due to a tramway and general strike in Brisbane that began in January 1912. Denham took a hard law & order line against the strike, even when the federal government declined his request to supply armed forces. An early election was called in April at which the Liberals increased their seats, albeit with losses in Brisbane.The government passed the Industrial Peace Act that took a hard line against the unions. The government took an increasingly hardline approach in the face of a revived Labor Party, but faced declining popularity.

In 1914 compulsory voting was introduced for state elections in the hope of shoring up support. However the party continued to stumble. Rural discontent continued with the result that in the 1915 election dissatisfaction with the Denham government led to the Queensland Farmers' Union running its own candidates, five of whom were elected and formed a distinct separate Country Party grouping in the Legislative Assembly of Queensland. The 1915 election saw the Liberals swept from power, losing over half their seats with Denham himself and many other ministers personally defeated. In opposition the party was briefly led by Edward Macartney, and then by James Tolmie, both former ministers.

The impact of Labor winning the election and their actions in government resulted in the opposition forces soon looking to ally. The National Political Council was formed in 1916 to co-ordinate activities between opposition groups and proved the foundation for further integration. The Australian Labor Party split of 1916 had only a minor impact in the state with Premier T. J. Ryan working hard to successfully keep the party together in the state with only limited losses and instead the emphasis remained on the opposition groups with the Liberals and Country Party coming together in July 1917 as the National Party. Tolmie became the leader of the new party.

== Leaders ==
Leader	Date started	Date finished
William Kidston	22 October 1908	7 February 1911
Digby Denham	7 February 1911	1 June 1915
Edward Macartney	24 June 1915	8 September 1915
James Tolmie	8 September 1915	6 July 1917
(Merged into the National Party)	6 July 1917	

== Election results ==
Election	Leader	Votes	%	Seats	+/–	Position	Government
1909	William Kidston	107,370	50.91	41 / 72	▲4	1st	Majority government
1912	Digby Denham	110,981	51.37	46 / 72	▲5	1st	Majority government
1915	Digby Denham	109,985	41.97	21 / 72	▼25	▼2nd	Opposition

== Bibliography ==
- Fitzgerald, Ross (1984). From 1915 to the Early 1980s: A History of Queensland. University of Queensland Press. ISBN 9780702217340.
- Hughes, Colin A. (1980). The Government of Queensland. University of Queensland Press. ISBN 978-0702215155.
