= T. J. Ryan =

Australian politician (1876–1921)

The Honourable T. J. Ryan KC
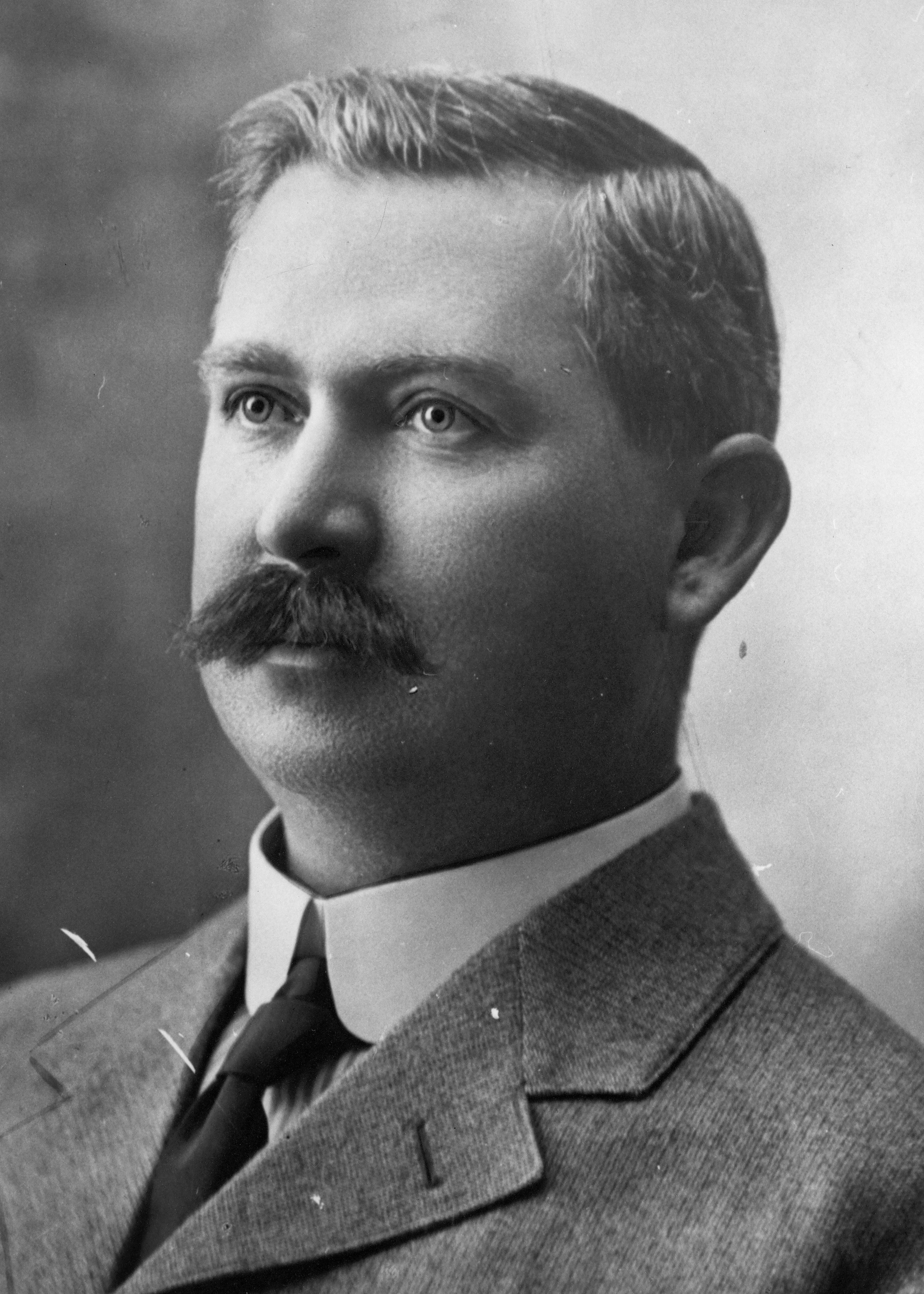
- Ryan in 1916

Assistant Leader of the Labor Party
- In office 9 September 1920 – 1 August 1921
- Leader: Frank Tudor
- Preceded by: office established
- Succeeded by: Matthew Charlton

Member of the Australian Parliament for West Sydney
- In office 13 December 1919 – 1 August 1921
- Preceded by: Con Wallace
- Succeeded by: William Lambert

19th Premier of Queensland
- In office 1 June 1915 – 22 October 1919
- Monarch: George V
- Governor: Hamilton Goold-Adams
- Deputy: Ted Theodore
- Preceded by: Digby Denham
- Succeeded by: Ted Theodore

Leader of the Opposition in Queensland
- In office 6 September 1912 – 1 June 1915
- Premier: Digby Denham
- Deputy: Ted Theodore
- Preceded by: David Bowman
- Succeeded by: Edward Macartney

Leader of the Labor Party in Queensland
- In office 6 September 1912 – 22 October 1919
- Deputy: Ted Theodore
- Preceded by: David Bowman
- Succeeded by: Ted Theodore

Member of the Queensland Legislative Assembly for Barcoo
- In office 2 October 1909 – 14 October 1919
- Preceded by: George Kerr
- Succeeded by: Frank Bulcock

Personal details
- Born: Thomas Joseph Ryan; 1 July 1876 Port Fairy, Colony of Victoria
- Died: 1 August 1921 (aged 45) Barcaldine, Queensland, Australia
- Cause of death: Pneumonia
- Resting place: Toowong Cemetery
- Party: Labor
- Spouse: Lily Virginia Cook (m. 1910)
- Children: 2
- Education: South Melbourne College; Xavier College, Melbourne
- Alma mater: University of Melbourne (BA, LLB)
- Occupation: Barrister; Teacher

Thomas Joseph Ryan KC (1 July 1876 – 1 August 1921) was an Australian politician who served as Premier of Queensland from 1915 to 1919, as leader of the state Labor Party. He resigned to enter federal politics, sitting in the House of Representatives for the federal Labor Party from 1919 until his premature death less than two years later.

Ryan was born in Port Fairy, Victoria, to Irish immigrant parents. He studied arts and law at the University of Melbourne, and worked for several years as a teacher at various private schools around Australia. He eventually settled in Queensland and entered the legal profession, working as a barrister in Brisbane. Ryan was elected to the Queensland Legislative Assembly in 1909, and became leader of the Labor Party in 1912. He led the party to victory at the 1915 state election, the first time it had secured majority government in Queensland.

As premier, Ryan led a reforming government that implemented many of the planks in the Labor platform, including the expansion of workers' rights, the implementation of price controls, and the establishment of new state-owned enterprises. After the Labor Party split of 1916, Queensland had the only remaining Labor government in Australia, giving Ryan a national profile. His government was re-elected at the 1918 state election but, in the following year, Ryan resigned to enter federal politics, winning the Division of West Sydney in New South Wales at the 1919 federal election. He was widely seen as the heir apparent to the Labor Party's federal leader, Frank Tudor, who was in poor health. Ryan's sudden death from pneumonia, at the age of 45, was seen as a major blow for the labour movement.

== Early life ==
Ryan was born on 1 July 1876 in Port Fairy, Victoria. He was the fifth of six children born to Timothy Joseph Ryan, an illiterate Irish labourer who had migrated to Victoria in 1860 and become a small farmer, and his Irish wife Jane (née Cullen). His mother died in 1883.

Ryan began his education at the Pretty Hill State School before winning a scholarship to attend Xavier College in Melbourne. He transferred to South Melbourne College at the age of 14 for financial reasons and worked as a pupil-teacher. He went on to study at the University of Melbourne, graduating Bachelor of Arts in 1897. Ryan subsequently moved to Tasmania where he taught classics at Launceston Church Grammar School, also completing a Bachelor of Laws by correspondence in 1899. He moved to Queensland in the same year where he taught at Maryborough Grammar School until 1900 and then at Rockhampton Grammar School from 1901 to 1903.

In 1901, Ryan was admitted to practise as a barrister in Queensland and established his own legal practice. He was active in workers' compensation cases which "[built] his reputation among the trade unions and awakened him politically". In 1903 he was elected president of the Rockhampton branch of the Australian Natives' Association.

== Queensland politician ==
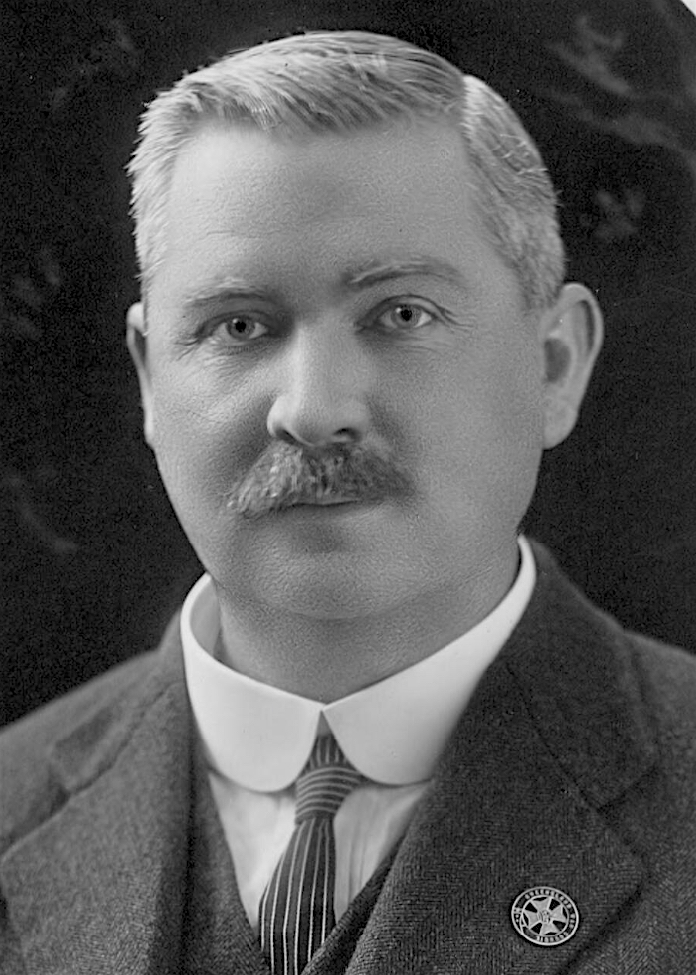
Ryan in 1920

At the 1903 federal election, Ryan stood unsuccessfully as an independent Protectionist candidate in the seat of Capricornia. He joined the Labor Party in 1904, and was the party's candidate in state seat of Rockhampton North at the 1907 state election, but was again unsuccessful. At the state election in October 1909, he was elected to the Legislative Assembly of Queensland as Labor member for Barcoo. He retained the seat for 10 years and, after the 1912 election, he was chosen as leader of the Labor Party, following the resignation of David Bowman.

After the party's success in the 1915 election, the Ryan government became the first majority Labor government in Queensland. Some of the eight members of his Cabinet had connections with the early ALP of the 1880s and the Shearers' Strike. His government provided the example which would see Labor in power in Queensland almost continuously until 1957.

Major reform of labour laws and agricultural policy was part of the Ryan legacy. His government came to power with a large majority, with Ryan as premier, chief secretary, and attorney-general. An era of progressive industrial legislation and the expansion of state enterprise began. Among the measures passed were the Industrial Arbitration Act, Labour Exchanges Act, Workers' Compensation Act, Inspection of Machinery and Scaffolding Act, and Factories and Shops Amendment Act.

However, where the Ryan government particularly broke fresh ground was the entry of the state into trading activities. Pastoral stations were purchased and run as going concerns, and many retail butchers' shops were opened in Brisbane and other parts of Queensland. These proved to be popular; selling meat at lower prices than elsewhere. A state insurance department was also established while sugarcane price boards were set up which provided fair returns for growers and fair wages for sugar workers. Women were given the right to stand for parliament, and industrial reforms were carried out which gave workers (according to one historian) a "new deal".

Ryan showed good generalship at the 1918 election and, despite a split in the Labor Party over conscription for overseas service, Ryan's government was returned with a large majority. The defection of Prime Minister Billy Hughes and a significant number of other Labor politicians to the non-Labor side, including New South Wales Premier William Holman, left Ryan as the head of the only Labor government at any level in Australia. As such, he was instrumental in leading the fight against conscription in the plebiscites launched by Hughes in 1916 and 1917.

Friction between Hughes and Ryan almost led to violence in November 1917, when the Australian federal government conducted a raid on the Government Printing Office in Brisbane, to confiscate copies of Hansard that covered debates in the Queensland Parliament during which anti-conscription sentiments had been aired. On 29 November 1917, Billy Hughes travelled to Warwick, southern Queensland, to campaign in support of the 1917 Australian conscription referendum. An egg was thrown at Hughes, resulting in his decision to form the Australian Federal Police.

The State Library of Queensland holds several collections providing insight into the complexity and divisiveness of the conscription debate at the time, but the Stable Collection 1917–1991 containing a surviving copy of Hansard No. 37 is considered a treasure among them.

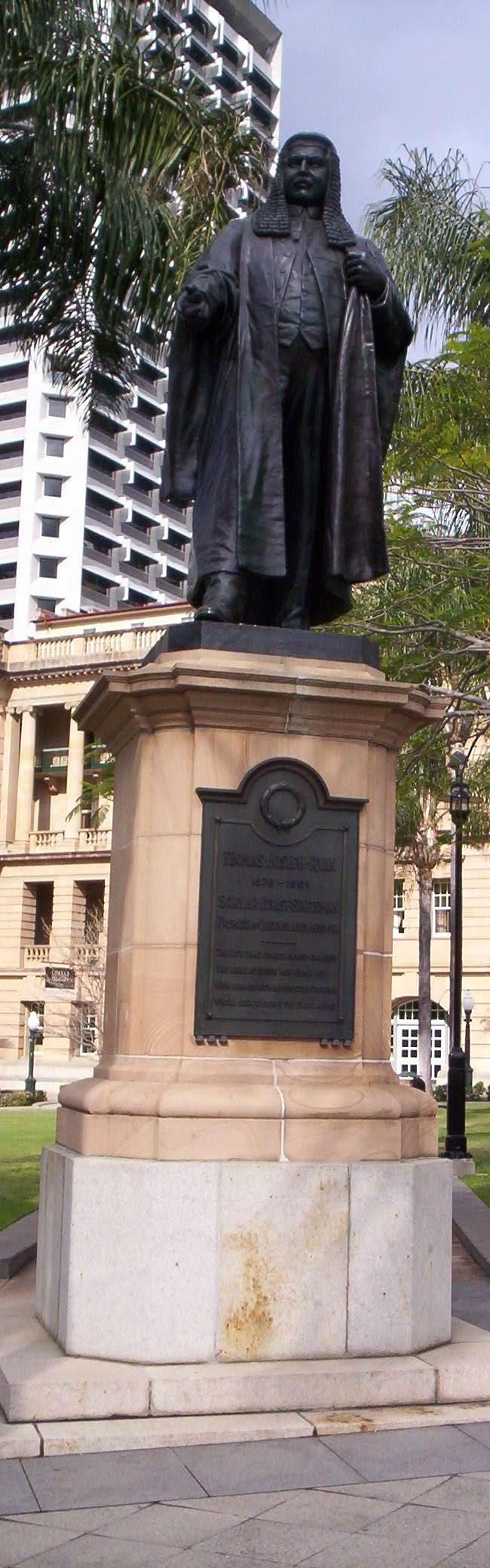
Statue of Thomas J. Ryan in Queens Gardens, Brisbane

== Federal politician ==
Ryan was asked by a resolution of a special federal Labor conference to enter federal politics, the only occasion that such a motion has been passed. He was campaign director for the Labor Party during the 1919 Federal election, and was elected to the House of Representatives in the Federal Parliament as the member for West Sydney. In 1920, he was appointed King's Counsel. He had been widely touted as a likely Labor leader before his premature death.

In 1920, Ryan was elected Assistant Leader of the Labor Party. This position was effectively the Deputy Leader of the party in the House of Representatives, as the Deputy Leadership was held by senator Albert Gardiner. Ryan held this position until his death.

Although a big man physically, Ryan was not strong in health. Weakened by influenza while he was in England at the time of the 1918 flu pandemic, he suffered repeatedly thereafter from bronchial and nasal infections. Furthermore, he seldom took a holiday and was tired from overwork. In July 1921, he set out to campaign for the Labor candidate William Dunstan in the by-election for the federal seat of Maranoa. He was sick at the start and his condition worsened during the long trip. On 1 August 1921, he died in Glenco Hospital, Barcaldine, Queensland, of pneumonia. His body was taken by train to Brisbane, past crowds gathered at each station. Archbishops Duhig and Mannix presided over his funeral in St Stephen's Cathedral and his burial in Toowong Cemetery.

== Personal life ==
Ryan married Lily Virginia Cook in 1910. She survived him with a son and a daughter and, in 1944, was appointed the Queensland government representative in Melbourne. Ryan was a Catholic and good friends of Archbishop of Brisbane James Duhig.

== Legacy ==
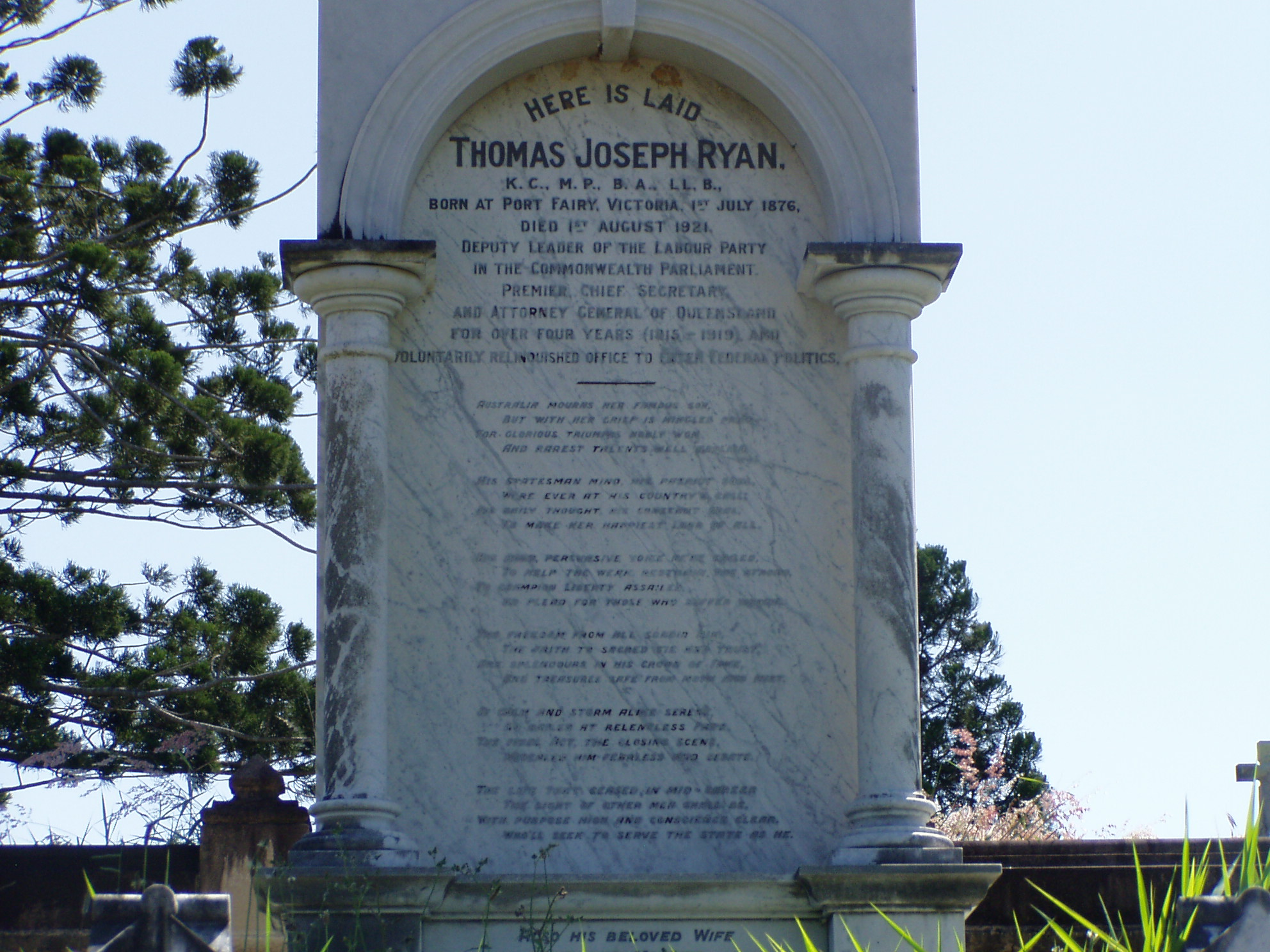
T. J. Ryan's headstone at Brisbane's Toowong Cemetery

The early death of such a capable leader was a great blow to the Labor movement. Ryan was described as urbane, amiable and approachable, and his personality had allowed him to win the confidence and trust of people in all ranks, from the governor of the Bank of England to militant unionists. He could hit hard with sarcasm when challenged by foes such as Hughes, yet he remained friendly with numerous fellow parliamentarians, including some of his firmest conservative opponents. The Queensland parliamentary officer and historian, Charles Bernays, regarded Ryan as the greatest parliamentary leader he had observed: "an earnest exponent of the faith that was in him, and a generous big-hearted fighter". Many other historians believe that Ryan, a much bolder figure than federal Labor leader Frank Tudor, would have been Australia's fourth ALP Prime Minister, had he lived just a few years more. A memorial fund collected money to erect a ten-foot (3 m) bronze statue which stands in Queen's Park, Brisbane, near the Old Executive Building. The wording on the metal plaque on the pedestal of the statue describes him as: "Scholar - Jurist - Statesman".

The Federal electoral division of Ryan is named after him, and a Ryan medal was struck for candidates obtaining the highest pass in the annual state scholarship examination.

== See also ==
- Ryan Ministry
- TJ Ryan Foundation

== Bibliography ==
- Queensland Political Portraits 1859-1952, University of Queensland Press, 1978
- Murphy, D. J. (1975). T. J. Ryan: A Political Biography. University of Queensland Press. ISBN 0702209929.
- Serle, Percival (1949). "Ryan, Thomas Joseph". Dictionary of Australian Biography. Sydney: Angus & Robertson.
- Lunney, Mark (2017). "The Limits of Political Libel: The Ryan v Argus Libel Trial" (PDF). Melbourne University Law Review. 41 (2): 758–792.

Political offices
Preceded by Digby Denham	Premier of Queensland; 1915–1919	Succeeded by Ted Theodore
Preceded by David Bowman	Leader of the Opposition of Queensland; 1912–1915	Succeeded by Edward Macartney
Preceded by David Bowman	Leader of the Labor Party in Queensland; 1912–1919	Succeeded by Ted Theodore
Parliament of Queensland
Preceded by George Kerr	Member for Barcoo; 1909–1919	Succeeded by Frank Bulcock
Parliament of Australia
Preceded by Con Wallace	Member for West Sydney; 1919–1921	Succeeded by William Lambert
