= Ryan ministry =

27th ministry of the Queensland Government

The Ryan Ministry was the 27th ministry of the Government of Queensland and was led by Premier T. J. Ryan of the Labor Party. It was the first majority Labor government in Queensland's history. It succeeded the Denham Ministry on 1 June 1915, following the latter's defeat at the 1915 state election on 22 May. The Theodore Ministry succeeded it on 22 October 1919 following T. J. Ryan's resignation from the Queensland Parliament to run for federal politics.

== First Ministry ==
On 1 June 1915, the Governor, Sir Hamilton Goold-Adams, designated eight principal executive offices of the Government and appointed the following Members of the Parliament of Queensland to the Ministry. They had been chosen by a caucus meeting of the Labor Party the previous day. Initially, as Labor was opposed to the Queensland Legislative Council entirely, it did not assign a portfolio to it; however, it ultimately appointed William Hamilton to the council on 10 July 1915 and assigned him the Mines portfolio.

During the term, David Bowman, a former leader of the Labor Party, died; John Adamson left the Ministry and the Labor Party over the conscription issue; and Hamilton was appointed president of the Legislative Council, with Alfred Jones replacing him both as the government's representative in the council and as a minister.

Office	Minister
Premier; Chief Secretary; Attorney-General; Secretary for Mines (until 10 July 1915); Home Secretary (10–23 March 1916)	T. J. Ryan
Deputy Premier; Treasurer; Secretary for Public Works	Ted Theodore
Home Secretary	David Bowman (until 25 February 1916)
Secretary for Agriculture and Stock	William Lennon
Secretary for Public Lands	John McEwan Hunter
Secretary for Railways	John Adamson (until 2 October 1916)
Secretary for Public Instruction	Herbert Hardacre
Minister without office (until 10 July 1915); Secretary for Mines (from 10 July 1915)	William Hamilton, MLC (8 June 1915 – 15 February 1917)
Minister without office (until 23 March 1916); Home Secretary (from 23 March 1916)	John Huxham (from 10 July 1915)
Secretary for Railways	Harry Coyne (from 13 October 1916)
Secretary for Mines	Alfred Jones, MLC (from 15 February 1917)
Minister without office	John Fihelly (from 10 July 1915)

== Second Ministry ==
The ministry was reconstituted on 30 April 1918 following the 1918 election.

Office	Minister
Premier; Chief Secretary; Attorney-General	T. J. Ryan
Deputy Premier; Treasurer; Secretary for Public Works	Ted Theodore
Secretary for Agriculture and Stock	William Lennon
Secretary for Public Instruction	Herbert Hardacre
Home Secretary	John Huxham
Secretary for Railways	John Fihelly
Secretary for Public Lands	Harry Coyne
Secretary for Mines	Alfred Jones, MLC
Minister without office	William Gillies

== Third Ministry ==
The ministry was altered on 9 September 1919 following the resignations of Herbert Hardacre and William Lennon; the following ministers served until the end of the ministry on 22 October 1919.

Office	Minister
Premier; Chief Secretary; Attorney-General	T. J. Ryan
Deputy Premier; Treasurer; Secretary for Public Works	Ted Theodore
Secretary for Public Instruction	John Huxham
Secretary for Railways	John Fihelly
Secretary for Public Lands	Harry Coyne
Secretary for Mines	Alfred Jones, MLC
Secretary for Agriculture and Stock	William Gillies
Home Secretary	William McCormack
Minister without office	James Larcombe

Preceded by Denham Ministry	Ryan Ministry; 1915–1919	Succeeded by Theodore Ministry
