= Richard Trout =

Australian politician

Member of the Queensland Legislative Assembly for Enoggera
- In office 25 February 1911 – 22 May 1915
- Preceded by: Arthur Hawthorn
- Succeeded by: William Lloyd

Personal details
- Born: Richard Trout; 18 December 1851 Exeter, Devon, England
- Died: 30 June 1932 (aged 80) Ashgrove, Queensland, Australia
- Resting place: Toowong Cemetery
- Party: Ministerial
- Spouse: Sophie Anne Newman (m.1872 d.1937)
- Occupation: Company director

Richard Trout (18 December 1851 – 30 June 1932) was a company director and member of the Queensland Legislative Assembly.

== Biography ==
Trout was born in Exeter, Devon, to John Trout and his wife Sarah (née Tree). He came to Australia at an early age and was educated at Brisbane State School. He worked at the government printer before trying his hand at mining at Palmer and became a director of Sturmfels Ltd, a wool broking company.

On 3 February 1872 he married Sophie Anne Newman (died 1937) at the residence of the bride's father, The Oval and together had five sons and five daughters. He died at Ashgrove, Brisbane, and his funeral proceeded from Cumestree, his Ashgrove home to the Toowong Cemetery.

== Political career ==
Trout, for the Ministerialists, won the 1911 by-election for the seat of Enoggera following the resignation of Arthur Hawthorn who had become a member of the Queensland Legislative Council. He defeated the Labor candidate, William Lloyd by 145 votes.

He held Enoggera until losing to Lloyd at the 1915 state election.

Parliament of Queensland
Preceded by Arthur Hawthorn	Member for Enoggera; 1911–1915	Succeeded by William Lloyd
