= Thomas O'Sullivan =

Australian politician (1856–1953)

The Honourable Thomas O'Sullivan KC
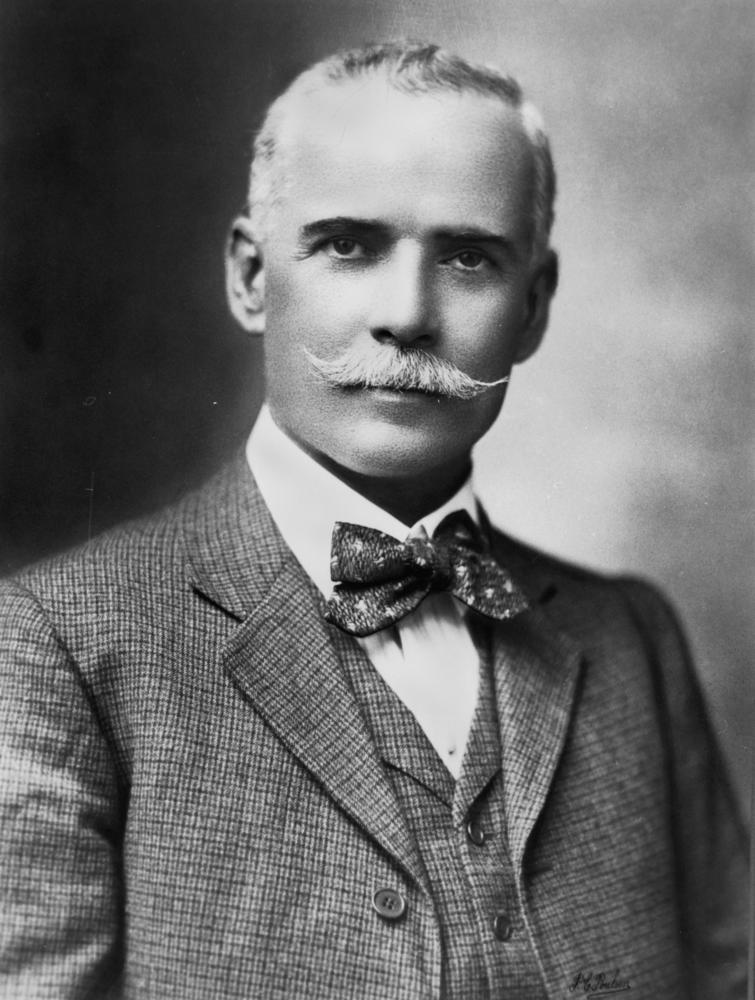

Member of the Queensland Legislative Council
- In office 24 September 1903 – 25 January 1906
- In office 18 February 1908 – 9 December 1915

Member of the Queensland Legislative Assembly for Warwick
- In office 27 August 1904 – 18 May 1907
- Preceded by: Arthur Morgan
- Succeeded by: George Barnes

Personal details
- Born: Thomas O'Sullivan; 13 December 1856 Ipswich, Queensland, Australia
- Died: 22 February 1953 (aged 96) Brisbane, Queensland, Australia
- Resting place: Toowong Cemetery
- Party: Kidstonites
- Spouse: Rosanna Mellin (m.1886 d.1937)
- Relations: Patrick O'Sullivan (father)
- Occupation: Solicitor, Barrister, Justice of the Supreme Court of Queensland

Thomas O'Sullivan QC (13 December 1856 – 22 February 1953) was a barrister, Justice of the Supreme Court of Queensland, and member of both the Queensland Legislative Council and Queensland Legislative Assembly.

== Early years ==
O'Sullivan was born at Ipswich, Queensland, to Patrick O'Sullivan, himself a future member of the Queensland Parliament, and his wife, Mary (née Real). He was educated at the local state school and at St. Mary's College, Ipswich. In 1873, O'Sullivan began his legal career in Ipswich, being employed by, and later articled to, Charles Frederick Chubb, Solicitor. Two years later he moved to Brisbane, being articled to Robert Little, but returned to Ipswich to look after his brother's legal business after his death in 1877. He was admitted as a solicitor in September 1878.

== Legal career ==
Moving back to Brisbane in 1886, O'Sullivan went into partnership with Charles Bedell Lilley, son of Sir Charles Lilley, and after the partnership finished O'Sullivan continued on with the business while also studying for the Bar and was admitted in 1900. In 1911, he was made a KC.

In 1915, O'Sullivan was appointed as a District Court judge, and made chairman of the Central Sugar Cane Prices Board. In 1922, he was made a judge in the Supreme Court of Queensland, serving until his retirement in 1926. During this time he was a member of the Court of Industrial Arbitration and chairman of the Land Appeal Court.

== Political career ==
O'Sullivan contested the electorate of Stanley, the seat his father had represented, at the 1899 election, losing to the Ministerialist candidate, Frederick Lord.

Within a week of having become premier in 1903, Arthur Morgan appointed O'Sullivan to the Queensland Legislative Council. During his term he was the Government Representative in the Legislative Council.

He resigned from the Council in January, 1906 to contest the seat of Warwick in a by-election to replace Arthur Morgan, who had resigned to join the Legislative Council. This time he was successful, winning by 449 votes to 435 against his competitor, George Barnes. He was appointed Secretary for Public Works in January 1906, serving until February 1907 when he was also given role of Agriculture, serving until November 1907.

In the 1908 election, O'Sullivan was once again up against Barnes, this time the latter was successful, winning by 1297 votes to 1206.

Within two weeks of losing his seat, O'Sullivan was reappointed to the Legislative Council, the Premier this time being William Kidston. He immediately returned to the role of Secretary for Agriculture in 1908, and then in October of that year he was made Attorney-General and remained in the position until June, 1915. He resigned in December 1915 to take up his appointment to the District Courts.

== Personal life ==
On 20 January 1886, O'Sullivan married Rosanna Mellin (d. 1937) at St Mary's Cathedral in Sydney. He had been a President of the Queensland Irish Association and the Johnsonian Club and was a member of the Constitutional Club.

Survived by three sons and two daughters, O'Sullivan died at his home in February 1953. He was accorded a state funeral, which was held at St Stephen's Cathedral and proceeded to the Toowong Cemetery.

Parliament of Queensland
Preceded by Arthur Morgan	Member for Warwick; 1906–1908	Succeeded by George Barnes
