= Pupil-teacher =

Training program for teachers

Pupil teacher was a training program in wide use before the twentieth century, as an apprentice system for teachers. With the emergence in the beginning of the nineteenth century of education for the masses, demand for teachers increased. By 1840, it had become evident that the academic preparation of students for teacher training in a college system was inadequate. In 1846, Britain formalised a pupil-teacher system, focusing on training middle-class teachers, in which a senior pupil of at least thirteen years old, served as an apprentice, typically for five years, to learn the teaching profession. Pupil-teachers acted as a teacher of younger children, learning from observation and practical application, while simultaneously completing their own educations.

It was widely criticised for its inability to provide adequate professional preparation, in the 1870s and 1880s, pupil teachers began being offered instruction at centres nationwide throughout Britain, which were designed to improve their training. The centres provided professional training by the best teachers in the elementary school system, but were not standardised. Most students who participated in centre programmes spent half of their training on theory at the centralised school and half of their training with hands-on teaching in schools.

In the Anglo-Caribbean, the system was widely used until the 1950s, offering students contracts of a specific period. The most promising primary students were selected for recruitment as educators. In exchange for offsetting the costs of their own education, they assisted teachers in instructing younger classmates. Upon completing their own education, pupil teachers were required to pass examinations to begin their own independent teaching. In some cases, the pupil teacher system was used as a stepping-stone to provide a basis of payment for secondary education before students were able to attend regular normal school training. While in theory, the Caribbean pupil-teacher program operated as an apprentice system, because there was an extreme shortage of teachers, in actuality, pupil-teachers often served as a full member of the teaching staff, having little time to attend to their own studies.

== See also ==
- Monitorial system
