= Peter Airey =

Australian politician

The Hon Peter Airey
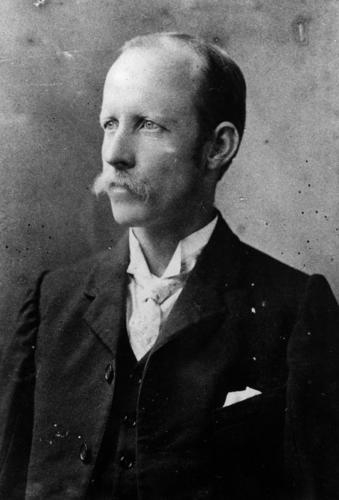

21st Treasurer of Queensland
- In office 18 February 1908 – 29 October 1908
- Preceded by: Robert Philp
- Succeeded by: Arthur Hawthorn
- Constituency: Brisbane South

Member of the Queensland Legislative Assembly for Flinders
- In office 13 July 1901 – 18 May 1907
- Preceded by: Charles McDonald
- Succeeded by: John May

Member of the Queensland Legislative Council
- In office 3 July 1907 – 13 January 1908

Member of the Queensland Legislative Assembly for Brisbane South
- In office 5 February 1908 – 2 October 1909
- Preceded by: William Stephens
- Succeeded by: John Huxham

Personal details
- Born: Peter Airey; 9 January 1865 Barrow-in Furness, Lancashire, England
- Died: 10 August 1950 (aged 85) Birkdale, Queensland, Australia
- Party: Independent
- Other political affiliations: Labour Party, Kidstonites
- Spouse: Martha Watts Lintern (m.1897 d.1965)
- Occupation: Teacher, writer, farmer

Peter Airey (9 January 1865 – 10 August 1950) was a Treasurer of Queensland, a member of the Queensland Legislative Council, and a member of the Queensland Legislative Assembly. Airey was also known as a poet and as a short story writer, publishing a number of pieces in various periodicals from 1888.

== Early life ==
Airey was born at Barrow-in Furness, Lancashire, in 1865 to Peter Airey and his wife Mary (née Akrigg). After his mother died, he travelled to Maryborough, Queensland with his father and brother in 1875. Three years later he was a pupil-teacher at Bundaberg North before being appointed an assistant teacher at Maryborough in 1883.

Airey then taught at several schools across southern and central Queensland including Bundamba, Rockhampton, Mount Morgan, Charters Towers, and Brisbane. He became president of the East Moreton Teachers' Association and led his colleagues in publicly demanding substantial salary increases. In February 1901, Airey was sent to Hughenden as head-teacher, allegedly as punishment for his demands.

== Political career ==
Representing the Labour Party, Airey was elected unopposed for the seat of Flinders. He was soon Whip and secretary of the parliamentary Labour Party and in 1903 he was elected the party leader and president of the central political executive.

Appointed Secretary for Mines & Public Works for nine days in 1904, Airey was then made Home Secretary, and remained in this role till July 1907. Having left the Labour party for the "Kidstonites", he was defeated at the 1907 Queensland state election by John May but was almost immediately appointed to the Queensland Legislative Council, remaining there for six months until he resigned to successfully contest the seat of Brisbane South at the extraordinary 1908 Queensland state election.

Airey was made Treasurer in February 1908 but was dropped from cabinet in October 1908 and, losing his seat in 1909, he retired from state politics. He was a member of the Cleveland Shire Council in 1924–27 and then quit politics altogether.

== Writing career ==
Airey was a very prolific poet writing under the pen-names "P. Luftig", "Philander Flam" and "Furness Born" as well as his own, although no collection of his works has been published to date. The Bulletin described his verse in 1904 as "a task entered upon as doggedly and conscientiously as the correction of school exercises and with as little poetic inspiration", but admitted occasional flights of something better.

== Personal life ==
Airey married Martha Watts Lintern in 1897 and together had 9 children. He retired to Birkdale and died there in 1950.

Political offices
Preceded by Robert Philp	Treasurer of Queensland; 1908	Succeeded by Arthur Hawthorn
Parliament of Queensland
Preceded by Charles McDonald	Member for Flinders; 1901–1907	Succeeded by John May
Preceded by William Stephens	Member for Brisbane South; 1908–1909	Succeeded by John Huxham
