= John Appel =

Australian politician (1859–1929)

The Hon John Appel
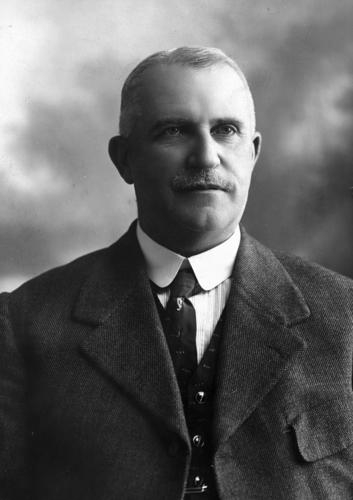

Member of the Queensland Legislative Assembly for Albert
- In office 5 February 1908 – 19 March 1929
- Preceded by: Thomas Plunkett Sr.
- Succeeded by: Thomas Plunkett Jr.

Personal details
- Born: John George Appel; 15 March 1859 South Brisbane, Queensland, Australia
- Died: 19 March 1929 (aged 70) Clayfield, Queensland, Australia
- Resting place: South Brisbane Cemetery
- Party: Country and Progressive National Party
- Other political affiliations: Ministerial, Queensland United Party, Queensland Farmers' Union, National
- Spouse: Ruth Sutherland (m.1879 d.1935)
- Occupation: Solicitor, Farmer

John George Appel (1859–1929) was an Australian politician, lawyer, and farmer. He served from 1908 to 1929 as a delegate for the electoral district of Albert and from 1909 to 1915 as the Secretary of Mine and Public Works and Home Secretary of Queensland.

== Early life ==
John George Appel was born on 15 March 1859 in Brisbane, Queensland, to George Appel and Maria Jane Appel, née Haussmann. He received his education first at Brisbane Normal School on Adelaide Street in Brisbane and then at the Brisbane Grammar School. After further instruction at a private school run by Reverend D. A’Court, he passed the preliminary bar examination for solicitors and was articled to G.V. Hellicar, of the law firm Thompson & Hellicar, on 3 June 1875. After five years, he passed his finals and was admitted to the bar on 3 August 1880. On 18 March 1879, he had married Ruth Sutherland, the daughter of James Sutherland of Brisbane.

Appel practiced law in Brisbane for some time until moving to Ipswich, Queensland as a partner of James Howard Gill, who had previously married Appel's sister, Annie Louise. In 1885 Gill became a crown solicitor and Appel continued the practice alone until 1887, when bad health forced him to Townsville. Appel was a freemason and in 1888–1889, while living in Townsville, he was master of the North Australian Lodge No. 1, United Grand Lodge of Queensland.

== Political and farming career ==
In 1889 Appel quit the practice of law for good and moved to a farm in Nerang, at Glencoe, where he both farmed and operated a dairy. During this time he owned two houses, one at Hamilton and one at Elston, near his farm. He quickly became involved in local politics at Hamilton, serving on the Hamilton Shire Council from 1890 to 1908 and as chairman twice during that period. He also served as Hamilton's mayor two times, and was on the Nerang Shire Council from 1902 to 1908. In addition, he was active in the agricultural community as president of the Southport Horticultural and Agricultural Association and member of the Queensland Fish Board.

During his career as a local politician, Appel made several attempts to transition to national politics, first standing for the electorate of Nundah as an Independent Liberal Democrat in 1893 and then again in 1907 for the electorate of Albert, losing both campaigns. In February 1908, however, he won the seat of Albert and held it until his death in 1929.

On 29 October 1908 he became Secretary for Mines and Public Works under Queensland Premier William Kidston and then became Home Secretary instead on 29 June 1909. On 22 October 1909 he once again received the Mines portfolio and was both Mines Secretary and Home Secretary until 26 February 1915 when, due to a disagreement with then-Premier Digby Denham, he resigned. During his time in the ministry, his most significant achievements were health legislation and codification of the Local Authorities Act.

He next became involved in the Queensland Farmers' Union, the forerunner of the Country Party, and led it in the Legislative Assembly from 1915 until 1918.

== Later life ==
On 19 March 1929, he died at Clayfield and was buried in South Brisbane Cemetery. He was survived by his wife Ruth, two daughters, and a son.

One of his homes, Windermere at Ascot, was listed on the Queensland Heritage Register on 21 October 1992.

Parliament of Queensland
Preceded by Thomas Plunkett Sr.	Member for Albert; 1908–1929	Succeeded by Thomas Plunkett Jr.
