= 1908 Queensland state election =

← 1907	5 February 1908	1909 →

All 72 seats in the Legislative Assembly of Queensland 37 Assembly seats were needed for a majority
- Turnout: 78.91 (▲7.30 pp)
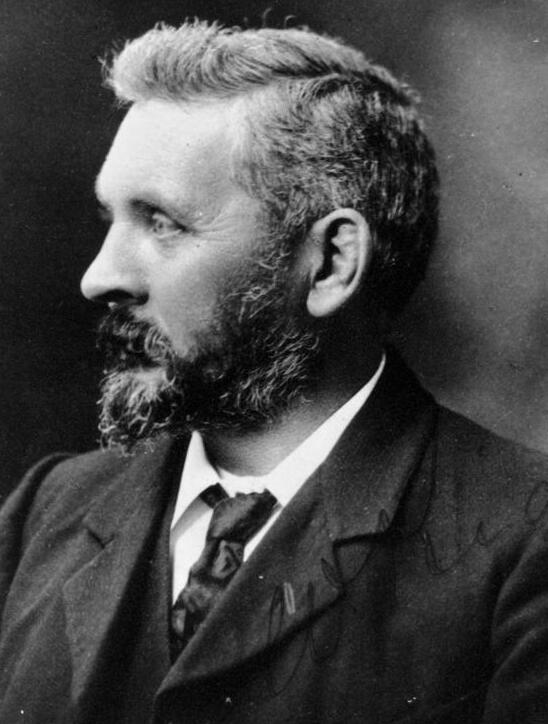

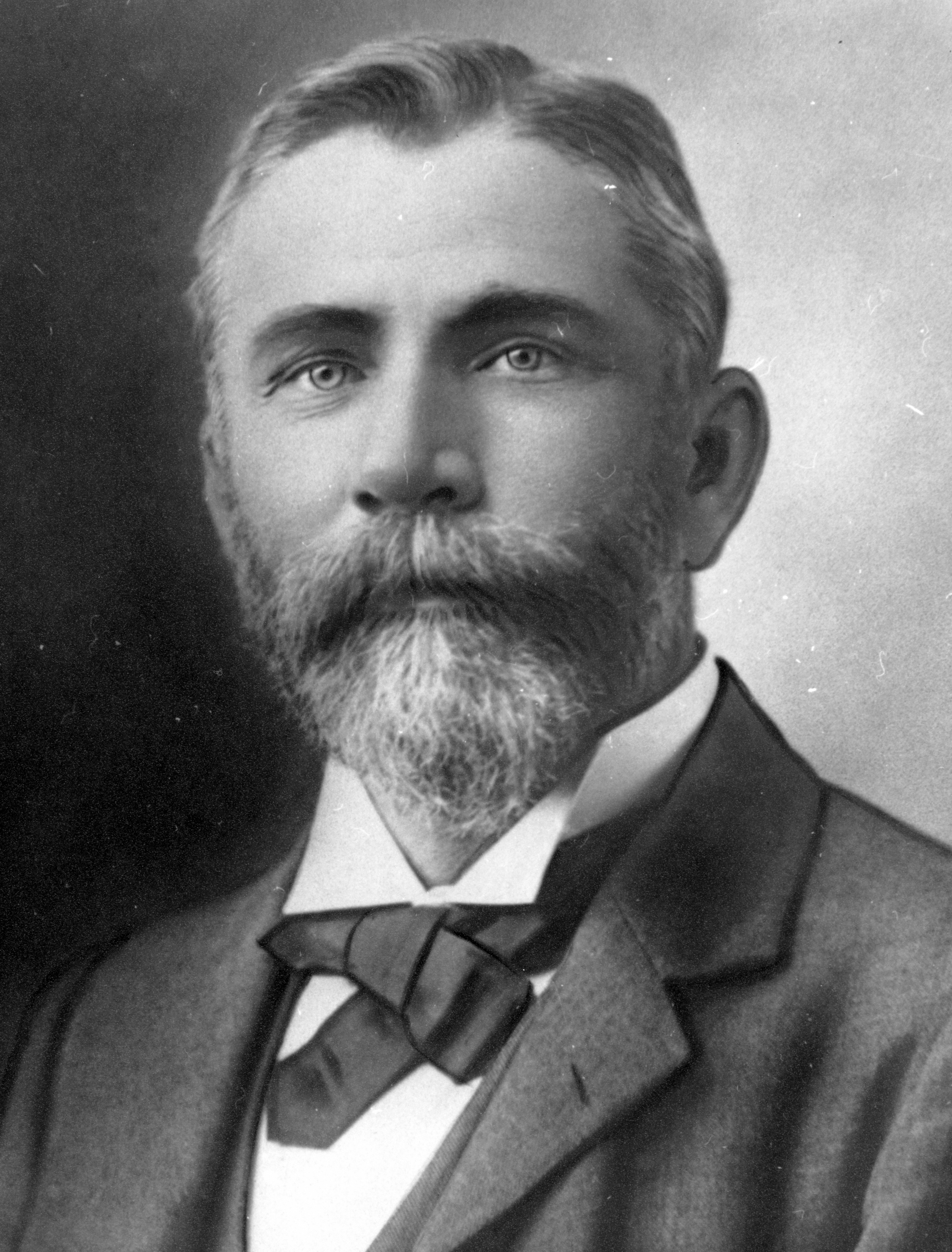

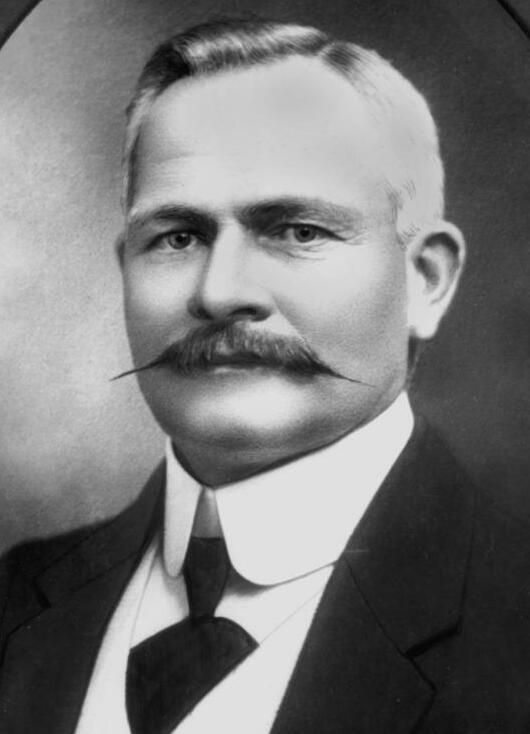
	First party	Second party	Third party
Leader	William Kidston	Robert Philp	David Bowman
Party	Kidstonites	Conservative	Labour
Leader since	19 January 1906	19 September 1904	15 April 1907
Leader's seat	Rockhampton	Townsville	Fortitude Valley
Last election	24 seats, 31.88%	29 seats, 40.58%	18 seats, 26.39%
Seats won	25	22	22
Seat change	▲1	▼7	▲4
Popular vote	44,997	75,563	55,771
Percentage	24.04%	40.37%	29.80%
Swing	▼7.84	▼0.21	▲3.41
Premier before election
Robert Philp
Conservative
Resulting Premier
William Kidston
Kidston Party

Elections were held in the Australian state of Queensland on 5 February 1908 to elect the 72 members of the state's Legislative Assembly. The election, held less than 9 months after the previous election, was made necessary by a series of events which had seen former premier William Kidston, who commanded a majority on the floor of the Assembly, resign following an attempt to convince the governor of Queensland to appoint sympathetic members to the Queensland Legislative Council, which had blocked key legislative measures. Following Kidston's resignation, Opposition leader Robert Philp was sent for and formed a ministry, but the ministry almost immediately lost a vote of no confidence in the Assembly, and as such, a new election had to be called.

This election used contingent voting, at least in the single-member districts.

Five districts were two-seat districts - Mackay, Marlborough, North Brisbane, Rockhampton and South Brisbane. In the two-member constituencies, plurality block voting was used -- electors could cast two valid votes but were allowed to "plump".

== Key dates ==
Date	Event
12 November 1907	Premier William Kidston resigned, and Robert Philp was sent for to form a ministry.
19 November 1907	The First Kidston Ministry resigned, and the Second Philp Ministry was sworn in.
31 December 1907	The Parliament was dissolved.
3 January 1908	Writs were issued by the governor to proceed with an election.
15 January 1908	Close of nominations.
5 February 1908	Polling day, between the hours of 8am and 6pm.
18 February 1908	The Second Philp Ministry resigned and the Second Kidston Ministry was sworn in.
26 February 1908	The writ was returned and the results formally declared.
3 March 1908	Parliament resumed for business.

== Results ==
The Kidstonites contested only 32 of the 72 seats, compared to 55 at the previous election.

Queensland state election, 5 February 1908 Legislative Assembly << 1907–1909 >>
Enrolled voters	175,823^{[1]}				
Votes cast	138,747		Turnout	78.91	+7.30
Informal votes	1,466		Informal	1.06	–0.61
Summary of votes by party
Party	Primary votes	%	Swing	Seats	Change
Conservative	75,563	40.37	–0.21	22	– 7
Labour	55,771	29.80	+3.41	22	+ 4
Kidstonites	44,997	24.04	–7.84	25	+ 1
Farmers Rep.	6,749	3.61	+3.61	2	+ 2
Independent	4,078	2.18	+1.04	1	± 0
Total	187,158^{[2]}			72	

^{1} 205,892 electors were enrolled to vote at the election, but 12 seats (16.7% of the total) representing 30,069 voters were uncontested—six Labor seats, five Conservatives and one Kidston.
^{2} In 11 electorates, voters had two votes each, so the total number of votes exceeds the total number of voters.

== See also ==
- Members of the Queensland Legislative Assembly, 1907–1908
- Members of the Queensland Legislative Assembly, 1908–1909
- Second Philp Ministry
- Second Kidston Ministry
