= Treasurer of Queensland =

Government position in an Australian state

- Coat of Arms of Queensland

- Flag of Queensland
- Incumbent; David Janetzki since 1 November 2024
- Queensland Treasury
- Style: The Honourable
- Member of: Parliament; Cabinet; Executive Council
- Reports to: Premier of Queensland
- Seat: 1 William Street, Brisbane
- Nominator: Premier of Queensland
- Appointer: Governor of Queensland on the advice of the premier
- Term length: At the governor's pleasure
- Formation: 15 December 1859
- First holder: Sir Robert Mackenzie, 10th Baronet

Treasurer of Queensland is the title held by the Cabinet minister who is responsible for the Queensland Treasury, and by extension, all financial matters of the Queensland Government.

== List of Queensland treasurers ==
No.	Portrait	Treasurer	Party	Title	Term start	Term end	Term in office
1		Robert Mackenzie	No party	Colonial Treasurer	15 December 1859	4 August 1862	2 years, 232 days
2		Thomas Moffatt	No party	Colonial Treasurer	4 August 1862	2 October 1864	2 years, 59 days
3		Joshua Bell	No party	Colonial Treasurer	22 December 1864	20 July 1866	1 year, 210 days
4		John McLean	No party	Colonial Treasurer	21 July 1866	16 December 1866	148 days
5		John Douglas	No party	Colonial Treasurer	19 December 1866	21 May 1867	153 days
6		Thomas Stephens	No party	Colonial Treasurer	21 May 1867	15 August 1867	86 days
(1)		Robert Mackenzie	No party	Colonial Treasurer	15 August 1867	25 November 1868	1 year, 102 days
7		Thomas Fitzgerald	No party	Colonial Treasurer	25 November 1868	27 January 1869	63 days
(6)		Thomas Stephens	No party	Colonial Treasurer	27 January 1869	3 May 1870	1 year, 96 days
8		Robert Ramsay	No party	Colonial Treasurer	3 May 1870	28 March 1871	329 days
(3)		Joshua Bell	No party	Colonial Treasurer	28 March 1871	8 January 1874	2 years, 286 days
9		William Hemmant	No party	Colonial Treasurer	8 January 1874	5 June 1876	2 years, 149 days
10		James Dickson	Ministerialist	Colonial Treasurer	5 June 1876	21 January 1879	2 years, 230 days
11		Thomas McIlwraith	Ministerialist	Colonial Treasurer	21 January 1879	5 January 1882	2 years, 349 days
12		Archibald Archer	Independent	Colonial Treasurer	5 January 1882	13 November 1883	1 year, 312 days
13		James Garrick	No party	Colonial Treasurer	13 November 1883	31 December 1883	48 days
(10)		James Dickson	Ministerialist	Colonial Treasurer	31 December 1883	17 August 1887	3 years, 229 days
14		Samuel Griffith	No party	Colonial Treasurer	17 August 1887	13 June 1888	301 days
(11)		Thomas McIlwraith	Ministerialist	Colonial Treasurer	13 June 1888	30 November 1888	170 days
15		William Pattison	No party	Colonial Treasurer	30 November 1888	19 November 1889	354 days
16		John Donaldson	Ministerialist	Colonial Treasurer	19 November 1889	12 August 1890	266 days
(11)		Thomas McIlwraith	Ministerialist	Colonial Treasurer	12 August 1890	27 March 1893	2 years, 227 days
17		Hugh Nelson	Ministerialist	Colonial Treasurer	27 March 1893	6 August 1896	4 years, 340 days
17		Hugh Nelson	Ministerialist	Treasurer	6 August 1896	2 March 1898	4 years, 340 days
18		Robert Philp	Ministerialist	Treasurer	2 March 1898	1 December 1899	1 year, 274 days
19		William Kidston	Labour	Treasurer	1 December 1899	7 December 1899	6 days
(18)		Robert Philp	Ministerialist	Treasurer	7 December 1899	1 February 1901	1 year, 56 days
20		Thomas Cribb	Ministerialist	Treasurer	1 February 1901	17 September 1903	2 years, 228 days
(19)		William Kidston	Labour	Treasurer	17 September 1903	18 May 1907	4 years, 63 days
(19)		William Kidston	Kidstonites	Treasurer	18 May 1907	19 November 1907	4 years, 63 days
(18)		Robert Philp	Conservative	Treasurer	19 November 1907	18 February 1908	91 days
21		Peter Airey	Kidstonites	Treasurer	18 February 1908	29 October 1908	254 days
22		Arthur Hawthorn	Liberal	Treasurer	29 October 1908	7 February 1911	2 years, 101 days
23		Walter Barnes	Liberal	Treasurer	7 February 1911	1 June 1915	4 years, 114 days
24		Ted Theodore	Labor	Treasurer	1 June 1915	9 March 1920	4 years, 282 days
25		John Fihelly	Labor	Treasurer	9 March 1920	8 February 1922	1 year, 336 days
(24)		Ted Theodore	Labor	Treasurer	8 February 1922	26 February 1925	3 years, 18 days
26		William Gillies	Labor	Treasurer	26 February 1925	22 October 1925	238 days
27		William McCormack	Labor	Treasurer	22 October 1925	21 May 1929	3 years, 211 days
(23)		Walter Barnes	CPNP	Treasurer	21 May 1929	17 June 1932	3 years, 27 days
28		William Smith	Labor	Treasurer	17 June 1932	12 April 1938	5 years, 299 days
29		Frank Cooper	Labor	Treasurer	12 April 1938	27 April 1944	6 years, 15 days
30		Ned Hanlon	Labor	Treasurer	27 April 1944	7 March 1946	1 year, 314 days
31		James Larcombe	Labor	Treasurer	7 March 1946	10 May 1950	4 years, 64 days
32		Vince Gair	Labor	Treasurer	10 May 1950	17 January 1952	1 year, 252 days
33		Ted Walsh	Labor	Treasurer	17 January 1952	26 April 1957	5 years, 207 days
33		Ted Walsh	Queensland Labor	Treasurer	26 April 1957	12 August 1957	5 years, 207 days
34		Thomas Hiley	Liberal	Treasurer	12 August 1957	23 December 1965	8 years, 133 days
35		Gordon Chalk	Liberal	Treasurer	23 December 1965	13 August 1976	10 years, 234 days
36		William Knox	Liberal	Treasurer	13 August 1976	15 December 1978	2 years, 124 days
37		Llew Edwards	Liberal	Treasurer	15 December 1978	18 August 1983	4 years, 246 days
38		Joh Bjelke-Petersen	National	Treasurer	19 August 1983	1 December 1987	4 years, 104 days
39		Mike Ahern	National	Treasurer	1 December 1987	25 September 1989	1 year, 298 days
40		Russell Cooper	National	Treasurer	25 September 1989	7 December 1989	73 days
41		Keith De Lacy	Labor	Treasurer	7 December 1989	19 February 1996	6 years, 74 days
42		Joan Sheldon	Liberal	Treasurer	19 February 1996	26 June 1998	2 years, 127 days
43		David Hamill	Labor	Treasurer	29 June 1998	21 February 2001	2 years, 237 days
44		Terry Mackenroth	Labor	Treasurer	22 February 2001	25 July 2005	4 years, 153 days
45		Peter Beattie	Labor	Treasurer	28 July 2005	2 February 2006	189 days
46		Anna Bligh	Labor	Treasurer	2 February 2006	13 September 2007	1 year, 223 days
47		Andrew Fraser	Labor	Treasurer	13 September 2007	26 March 2012	4 years, 195 days
48		Tim Nicholls	Liberal National	Treasurer	26 March 2012	14 February 2015	2 years, 325 days
49		Curtis Pitt	Labor	Treasurer	14 February 2015	12 December 2017	2 years, 301 days
50		Jackie Trad	Labor	Treasurer	12 December 2017	10 May 2020	2 years, 150 days
51		Cameron Dick	Labor	Treasurer	11 May 2020	28 October 2024	4 years, 170 days
52		David Janetzki	Liberal National	Treasurer	1 November 2024	Incumbent	1 year, 311 days

== See also ==
- Politics of Queensland
