= 1909 Queensland state election =

- 2 October 1909

All 72 seats in the Legislative Assembly of Queensland 37 Assembly seats were needed for a majority
- Turnout: 72.67 (▼6.24 pp)
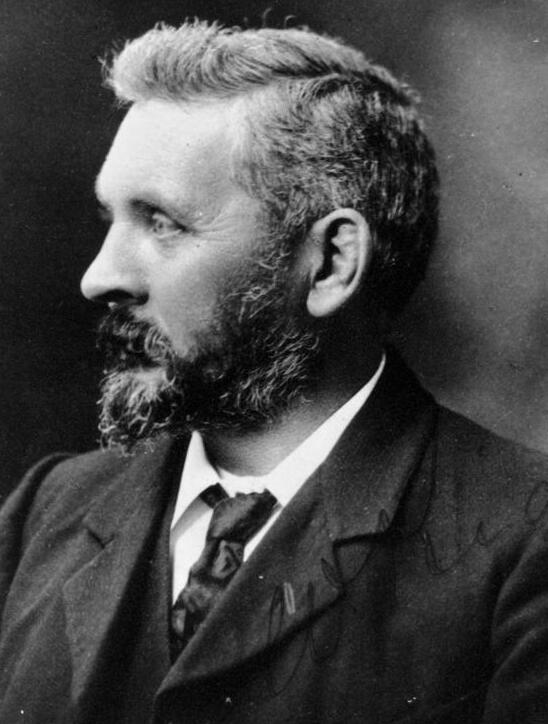

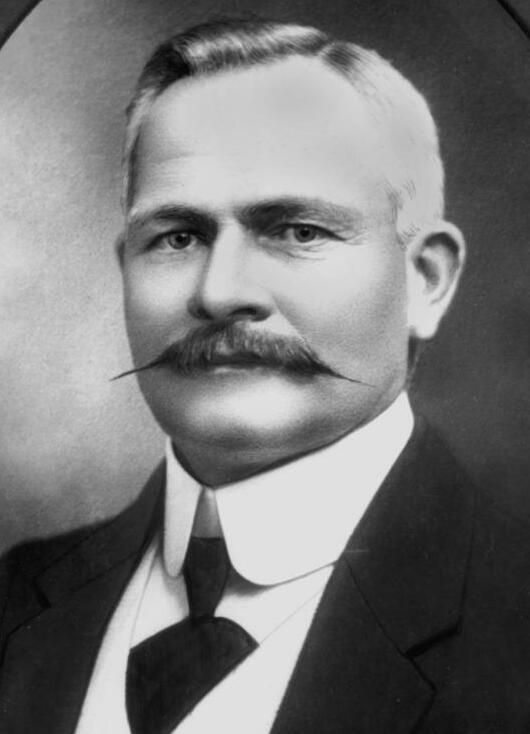
	First party	Second party
Leader	William Kidston	David Bowman
Party	Liberal	Labour
Leader's seat	Rockhampton	Fortitude Valley
Last election	New party	23 seats, 29.80%
Seats won	41	27
Seat change	▲4	▲4
Popular vote	107,370	77,712
Percentage	50.91%	36.85%
Swing	▲10.32	▲6.77
Premier before election
William Kidston
Liberal
Elected Premier
William Kidston
Liberal

Elections were held in the Australian state of Queensland on 2 October 1909 to elect the members of the state's Legislative Assembly.

This election used contingent voting, at least in the single-member districts.

Five districts were two-seat districts - Mackay, Marlborough, North Brisbane, Rockhampton and South Brisbane. In the two-member constituencies, plurality block voting was used -- electors could cast two valid votes but were allowed to "plump".

== Key dates ==
The elections were held on 2 October 1909.

== Results ==
Queensland state election, 2 October 1909 Legislative Assembly << 1908–1912 >>
Enrolled voters	242,754				
Votes cast	210,912		Turnout	72.67%	
Informal votes	1,652		Informal		
Summary of votes by party
Party	Primary votes	%	Swing	Seats	Change
Liberals	107,370	50.91%	+10.32	41	+4
Labour	77,712	36.85%	+6.77	27	+4
Opposition	22,439	10.64%		4	+4
Independent	3,391	1.61%	+0.94	0	-1
Total	210,912			72	

== See also ==
- Members of the Queensland Legislative Assembly, 1909–1912
