= Arthur Hawthorn =

Australian politician

The Honourable Arthur Hawthorn
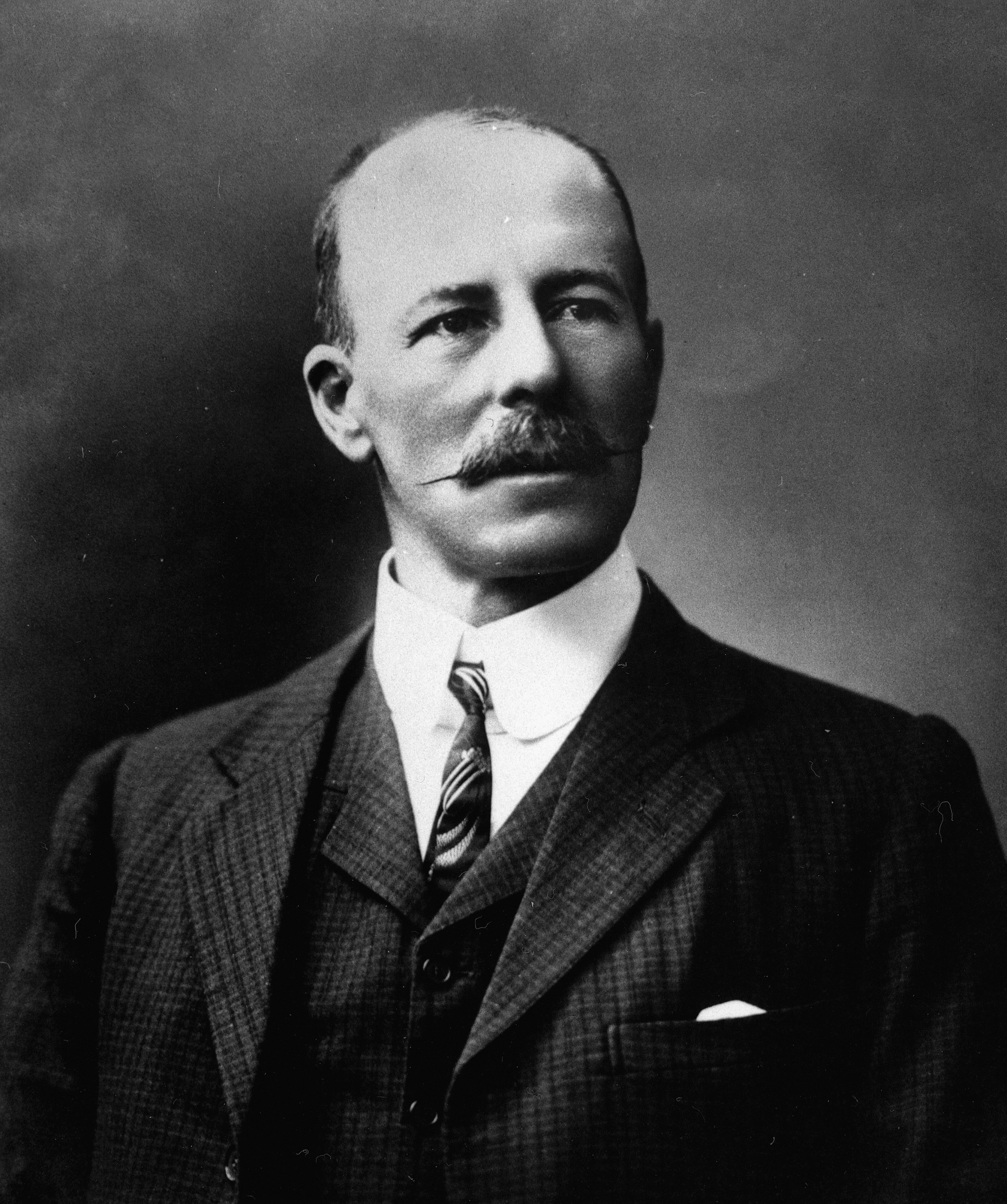

22nd Treasurer of Queensland
- In office 29 October 1908 – 7 February 1911
- Preceded by: Peter Airey
- Succeeded by: Walter Barnes
- Constituency: Enoggera

Member of the Queensland Legislative Assembly for Enoggera
- In office 11 March 1902 – 7 February 1911
- Preceded by: Matthew Reid
- Succeeded by: Richard Trout

Member of the Queensland Legislative Council
- In office 11 February 1911 – 23 March 1912
- In office 1 July 1912 – 23 March 1922

Personal details
- Born: Arthur George Clarence Hawthorn; 31 October 1859 Hobart Town, Tasmania, Australia
- Died: 6 May 1934 (aged 74) Brisbane, Queensland, Australia
- Resting place: Toowong Cemetery
- Party: Ministerial
- Spouse: Mary Stewart (m.1894 d.1949)
- Occupation: Solicitor

Arthur George Clarence Hawthorn (31 October 1859 – 6 May 1934) was a solicitor, and member of both the Queensland Legislative Council and Queensland Legislative Assembly.

== Early life ==
Hawthorn was born in October 1859 at Hobart Town, Tasmania, to George Hawthorn, shipmaster, and his wife Isabella Marie Louise (née Steele). Educated at Hobart High School, he was articled to three separate firms before being admitted as a solicitor in 1884 and immediately received an offer from Brisbane solicitor, Thomas Macdonald-Paterson to join him as a partner in the firm Macdonald-Patterson, Fitzgerald & Hawthorn. The firm was later to become Hawthorn & Byram in 1900, Hawthorn & Lightoller in 1916, and A. G. C. Hawthorn & Co. in 1931.

== Political career ==
Hawthorn was elected to the Ithaca Shire Council in 1899, and rose to be president in 1901. From 1901 until 1904 he was also an executive of the Local Authorities' Association of Queensland.

At the 1902 Queensland elections, Hawthorn, representing the Ministerialists, contested the seat of Enoggera, soundly defeating the sitting Labour member, Matthew Reid. During his time as member, Hawthorn was twice Home Secretary, for eight months in 1907 and for four months in 1908. On 29 October 1908, Hawthorn was appointed Treasurer of Queensland, remaining in the role until his resignation from the Legislative Assembly on 7 February 1911.

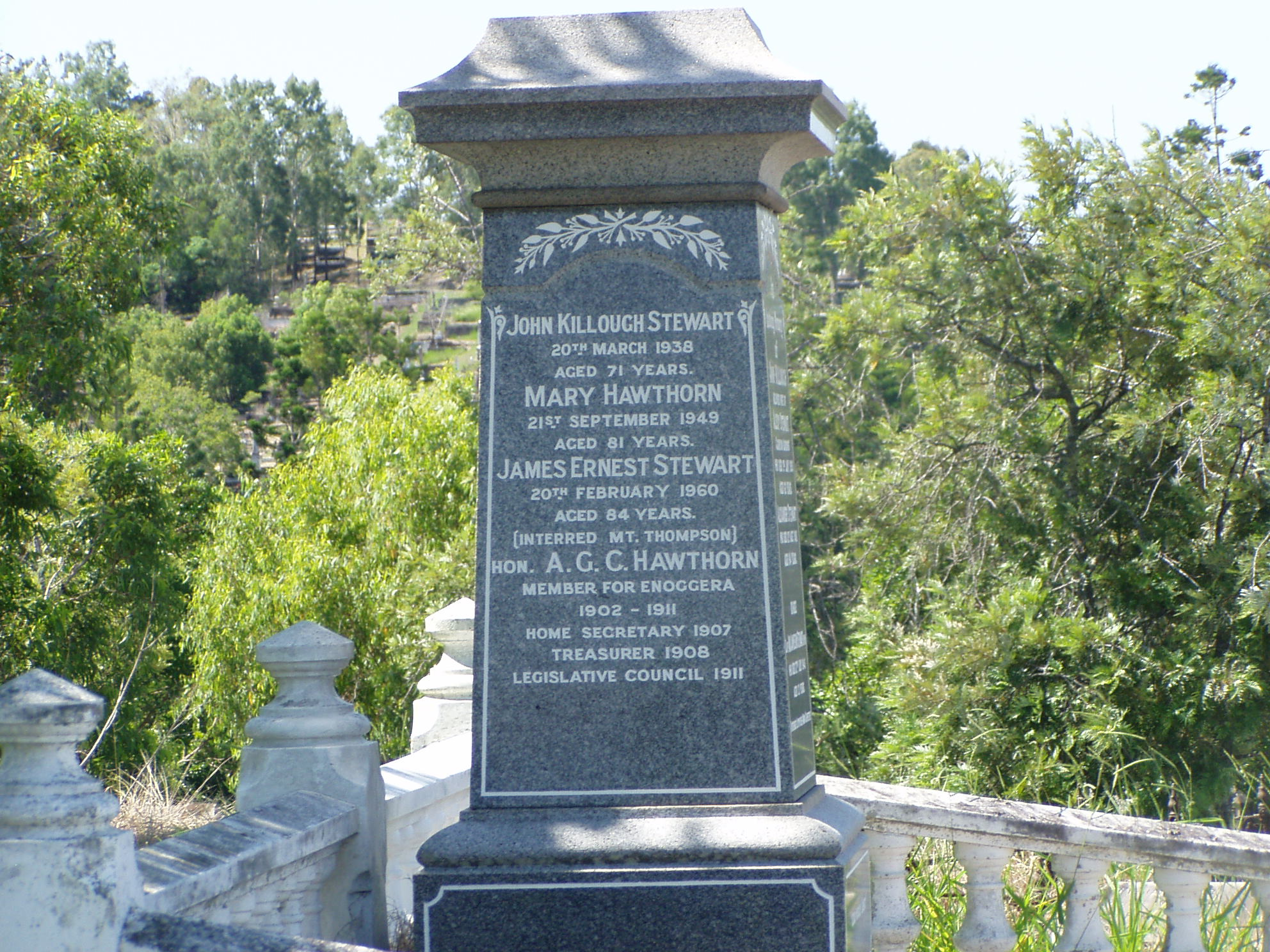
Headstone of Arthur George Clarence Hawthorn

Four days after his resignation, Hawthorn was appointed to the Legislative Council, but resigned on 23 March 1912 to unsuccessfully contest the seat of Ithaca at the 1912 Queensland state election where he was defeated by the Labor candidate, John Gilday. Three months later, he was once again appointed to the Council, this time remaining there till it was abolished in March 1922.

== Personal life ==
Hawthorn married Mary Stewart (died 1949) at Glen Lyon on 12 December 1894 and together had two daughters, Alice and Dorothy. He died in May 1934 and his funeral proceeded from Farnborough, his home in Ashgrove to the Toowong Cemetery.

Parliament of Queensland
Preceded by Matthew Reid	Member for Enoggera; 1902–1911	Succeeded by Richard Trout
Political offices
Preceded by Peter Airey	Treasurer of Queensland; 1908–1911	Succeeded by Walter Barnes
