= Digby Denham =

Australian politician (1859–1944)

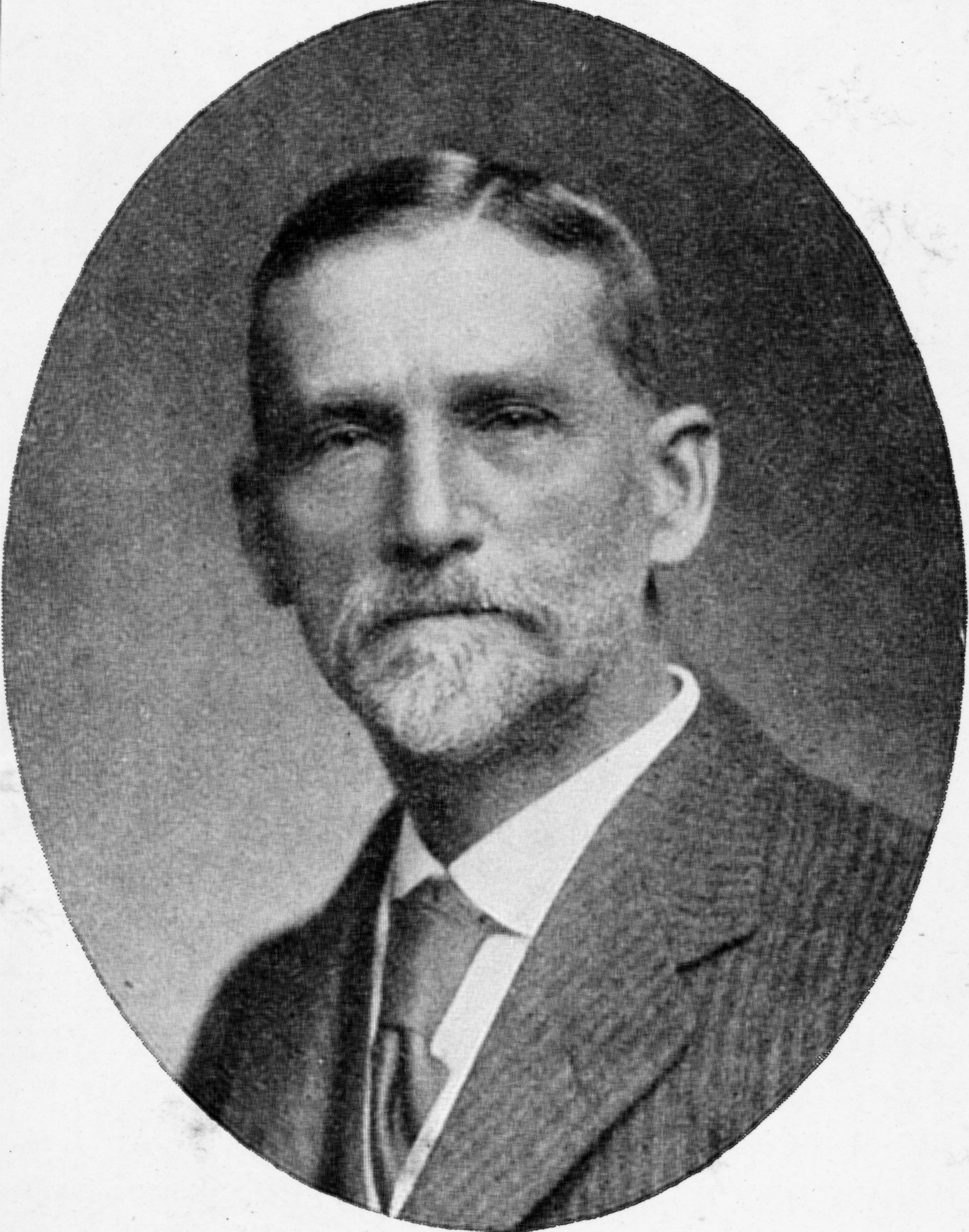

18th Premier of Queensland
- In office 7 February 1911 – 1 June 1915
- Deputy: Thomas O'Sullivan
- Preceded by: William Kidston
- Succeeded by: T. J. Ryan

Deputy Premier of Queensland
- In office 22 June 1909 – 7 February 1911
- Preceded by: Andrew Henry Barlow
- Succeeded by: Thomas O'Sullivan
- In office 19 November 1907 – 18 February 1908
- Preceded by: Andrew Henry Barlow
- Succeeded by: Andrew Henry Barlow

Member of the Queensland Legislative Assembly for Oxley
- In office 3 July 1902 – 22 May 1915
- Preceded by: Samuel Grimes
- Succeeded by: Thomas Jones

Personal details
- Born: Digby Frank Denham; 25 January 1859 Langport, Somerset, England
- Died: 10 May 1944 (aged 85) Annerley, Brisbane, Australia
- Resting place: South Brisbane Cemetery
- Party: Ministerial
- Other political affiliations: Liberal Party
- Spouse: Alice Maud Knight

Digby Frank Denham (25 January 1859 – 10 May 1944) was a politician and businessman in Queensland, Australia. He was a Premier of Queensland and Member of the Queensland Legislative Assembly. He was the first of only two Queensland Premiers to lose their own seat at a general election.

== Early life ==
Denham was born in Langport, Somerset, England on 25 January 1859 to William Denham, a baker, and his wife Edna Grace, née Cooke. He studied at Langport Grammar School before being indentured to a drapery firm in July 1873. In 1881 Denham migrated to South Australia where he formed a business partnership in Mallala with a commercial traveller, George Cable Knight. He married Knight's sister Alice Maud at North Adelaide on 16 April 1884: they were to have two daughters and a son.

Denham moved to Sydney in 1885 to form a partnership in John Melliday & Co. He opened a branch of the firm in Brisbane in 1886, and then bought out the firm in partnership with his brother in 1890, renaming it to Denham Bros, Produce and Grain Merchants. He became involved in several other companies over the following years and by the early 1900s he was chairman of the New Swanbank Colliery Co. and one of the leading businessmen in Brisbane.

== Politics ==
From February 1892 until 1902, Denham served as a member, and for four years as chairman, of the Stephens Divisional Board (later the Shire of Stephens) based in Annerley.

He was a member of the Legislative Assembly of Queensland from 1902 until 1915 representing the seat of Oxley, and was Premier of Queensland from 7 February 1911 to 1 June 1915.

In June 1902 he was elected to the Legislative Assembly of Queensland for Oxley. He campaigned in opposition to a state income tax which Robert Philp's government had proposed, although by the time he became premier in 1911, he had concluded that it was not high enough.

In September 1903 Philp's government resigned when its income tax measures were narrowly passed with three supporters, including Denham, crossing the floor. A Liberal-Labour coalition government headed by Arthur Morgan was formed and Denham was appointed Home Secretary and Secretary for Agriculture portfolios in the new administration. In April 1904, Denham became Secretary for Agriculture and Public Works, and in 1906 took on Agriculture and Railways as part of William Kidston's government.

In February 1907, sensing that a new anti-Labour coalition could be formed, he resigned his portfolios. Ultimately, Kidston resigned as Premier in November 1907 following the Governor's refusal to appoint sympathetic members to the Queensland Legislative Council, and Philp formed a new conservative ministry in November. Denham, now Home Secretary, became the Deputy Premier. However, the Ministry did not command the support of a majority of Parliament, and failed almost immediately, with a new election in February 1908 returning government to Kidston's party. However, later that year, Kidston amalgamated his own party with Philp's as the Liberals, and Denham returned to the ministry as Secretary for Public Lands. On 7 February 1911 he succeeded Kidston as Premier.

Denham's major contribution was the Land Act 1910, which consolidated 50 years of Acts and amendments as well as historic New South Wales legislation still in force in Queensland, and removed much confusion. He was widely praised for his grasp of the legislation.

While Denham commanded an easy majority in the Legislative Assembly, he did not always lead a united party – a parliamentary group known as the Farmers' Union emerged within the party in reaction to various legislation, while the Legislative Council refused to pass key legislation such as a 1911 liquor bill. A tramway and general strike erupted in Brisbane on 18 January 1912, and Denham enlisted the police and special constables to deal with the strikers, who were criticised for their violent handling of the dispute. When the Commonwealth refused his request to send in the armed forces, Denham contemplated landing troops from a German warship to assist. He called an election, in which his government lost seats in Brisbane (mostly to Labor) but won new seats in rural areas and retained office. The Industrial Peace Act 1912 established an Industrial Court which did not recognise trade unions.

The 1915 election saw the Liberal government swept out of power; 21 seats changed hands, with the main beneficiaries being the new Farmers' Union, an early precursor to the Country Party, and the Labor Party, which formed a majority government for the first time under T. J. Ryan. Denham lost his own seat in the election, as did several of his ministers. Denham was the first of only two Queensland Premiers to lose his seat in a general election, the other being Campbell Newman in the 2015 election.

== Later life ==
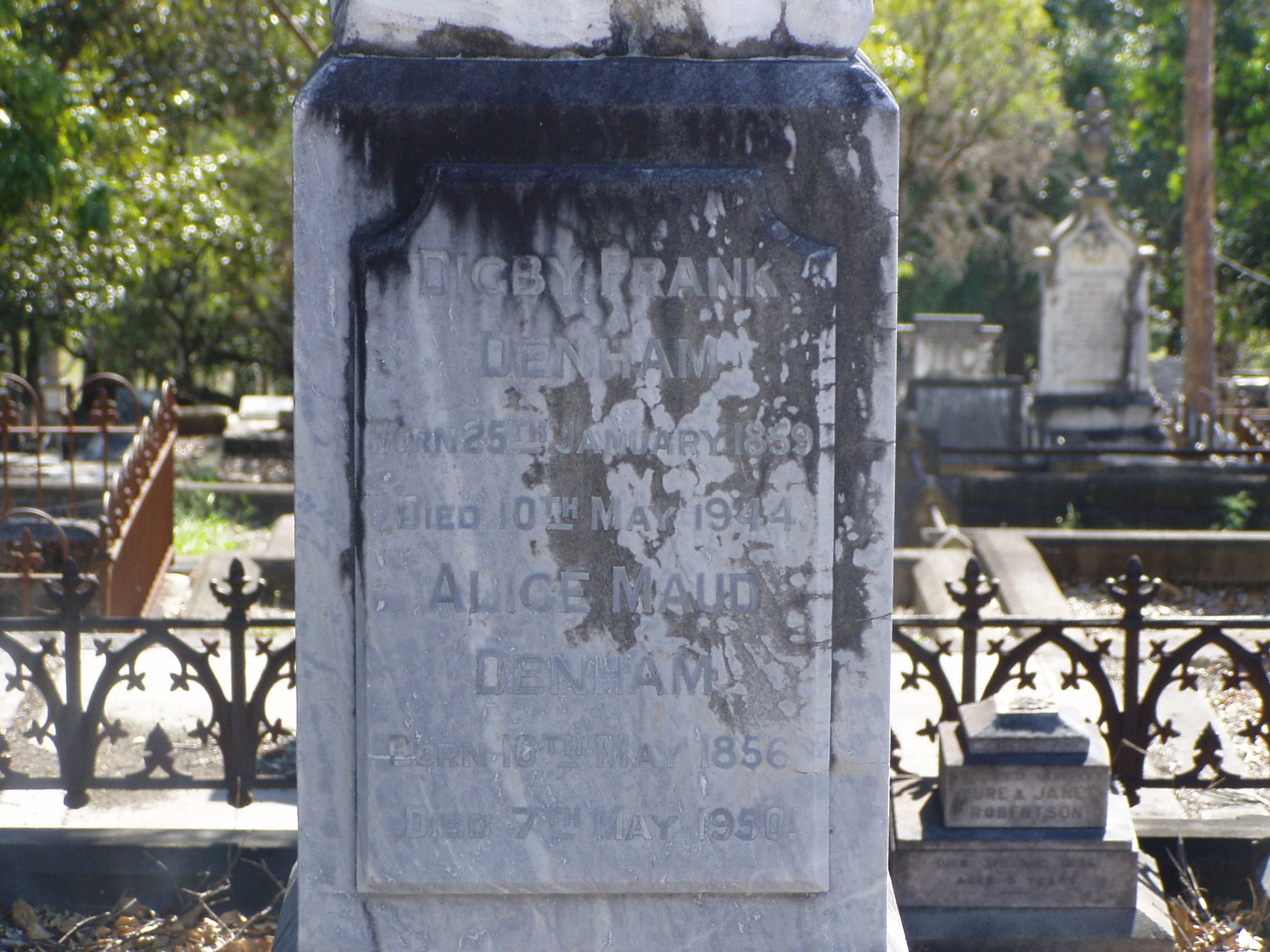
Digby Denham's headstone at Brisbane's South Brisbane Cemetery.

Denham returned to business, establishing new firms in the Maryborough area in the late 1920s. He keenly supported the establishment of the University of Queensland, the ambulance service and the Baptist Church in Queensland. He was Grand Master of the Loyal Orange Institution of Queensland and frequently took the chair with Oxley True Blues LOL 19 who met at the Orange Hall in Sherwood (although this was not his parent lodge).

Denham died on 10 May 1944 at Annerley, survived by his wife and children. His family declined a state funeral and on 12 May a private funeral service commenced at his home Ingleside at 391 Annerley Road, Annerley followed by his burial in the nearby South Brisbane Cemetery. At probate, his estate was valued at £44,085.

Denhams in Brisbane went into voluntary liquidation but the companies in Maryborough and Rockhampton continued.

His residence Ingleside is heritage-listed and is located at 391 Annerley Road, Annerley, close to the intersection of Denham Street, presumably named after him.

Political offices
Preceded by William Kidston	Premier of Queensland; 1911–1915	Succeeded by T. J. Ryan
Parliament of Queensland
Preceded by Samuel Grimes	Member for Oxley; 1902–1915	Succeeded by Thomas Jones
