= George Kerr (Australian politician) =

Australian politician

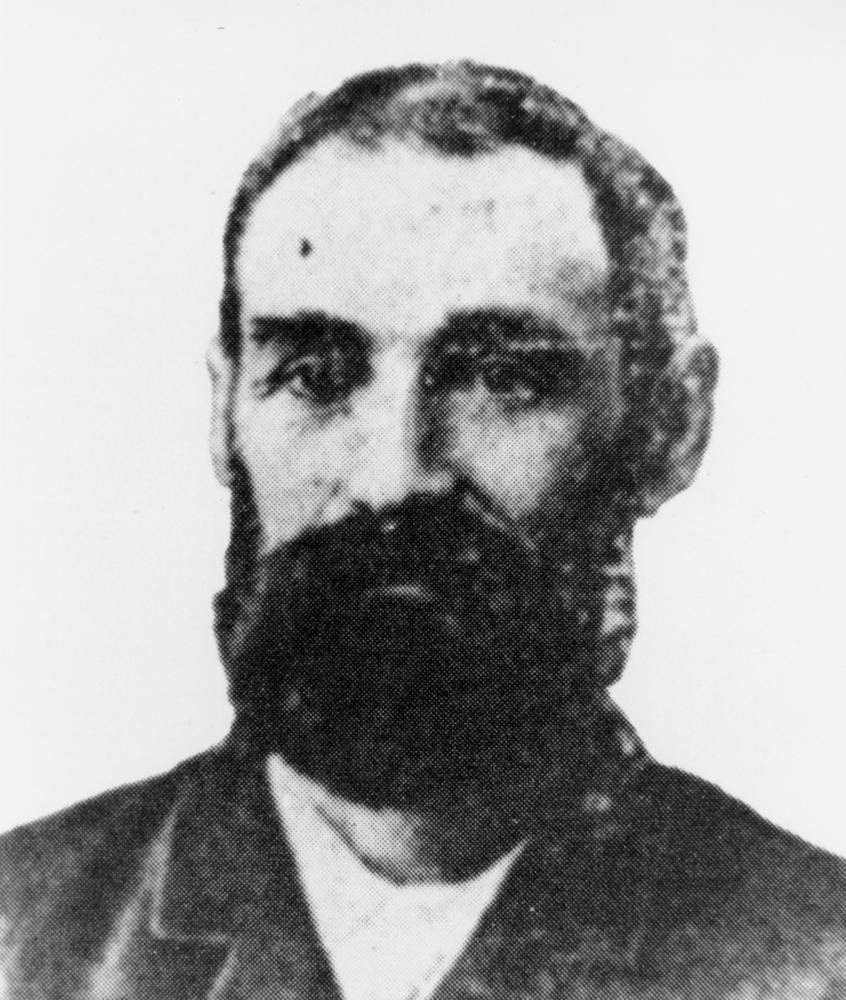

Member of the Queensland Legislative Assembly for Barcoo
- In office 20 May 1893 – 2 October 1909
- Preceded by: Tommy Ryan
- Succeeded by: T. J. Ryan

Personal details
- Born: George Kerr; 7 February 1853 Beadnell, Northumberland, England
- Died: 18 January 1930 (aged 76) Brisbane, Queensland, Australia
- Resting place: Toowong Cemetery
- Party: Labor
- Other political affiliations: Ministerial, Opposition, Independent
- Spouse(s): Florence McCulloch (m.1882 d.1883), Susan Jane Moore (nee Deacon) (m.1891)
- Occupation: Blacksmith, Grazier

George Kerr (1853–1930) was an Australian politician, grazier, and blacksmith. He was a Member of the Queensland Legislative Assembly and leader of the state Labor Party.

== Early life ==
Kerr was born on 7 February 1853 at Beadnell, Northumberland, England and after training to become a blacksmith moved to Queensland in 1877.

He became a mining speculator on the Croydon goldfields and then set up his own forge in Tambo, Queensland to service mining operations in the local region.

== Politics ==
Kerr became involved in local politics for the Labor, and in 1893 he was elected to represent the electoral district of Barcoo in the Legislative Assembly of Queensland and served in that post until 1909. He rose to senior positions within the party, culminating in his election as leader of the Queensland Parliamentary Labor Party in 1904 after the death of his predecessor William Browne. Kerr's leadership was complicated by a split in the party in 1905 in which he and other senior Labor figures opted to form a coalition with the Liberal Party to achieve statewide reforms. Although initially he commanded the confidence of the party, a state conference of the party in 1907 rejected Kerr's leadership and the Liberal-Labor coalition, opting to go into the 1907 state election alone. Kerr continued in parliament as an independent Labor member but was challenged by official Labor candidates until his defeat in his seat in 1909.

== Later life ==
Kerr died on 18 January 1930 in Brisbane and was buried in Toowong Cemetery.

Party political offices
Preceded by Billy Browne	Leader of the Labor Party in Queensland; 1904–1907	Succeeded by David Bowman
Parliament of Queensland
Preceded by Tommy Ryan	Member for Barcoo; 1893–1909	Succeeded by T. J. Ryan
