= Kidstonites =

- Leader: William Kidston
- Founded: May 1907
- Dissolved: October 1908
- Merged into: Liberals
- Ideology: Interventionism; Social democracy

The Kidstonites, also known as the Kidston Party, was a political party in the Australian state of Queensland in 1907 to 1908, formed by William Kidston. The party resulted from a split in the Queensland Labor Party and spent most of its existence in government, before merging with the conservative faction of Robert Philp in October 1908, to form the Liberal Party.

== History ==
In 1903, Queensland's long-running Continuous Ministry fell and was replaced by a coalition of liberals and Labor. The government was headed by Arthur Morgan and included two Labor members, though not the party leaders. In 1906, Morgan was succeeded as Premier by William Kidston, one of the Labor members of the government. However, Kidston grew increasingly dissatisfied with the official direction of the Labor Party as set by the 1905 party convention on the issues of collective ownership and Crown land sales, which he felt to be impractical and electorally unrealistic.

The 1906 federal election saw Labor do badly in Queensland at the hands of the Anti-Socialist Party, confirming Kidston's views as conflict grew between pursuing an efficient reformist government and the pursuit of Labor's stated interests and ideology. Kidston demanded greater loyalty to himself but the 1907 party convention reaffirmed the socialist objective, resulting in a split.

All but fourteen members of the Labor parliamentary party rallied to Kidston's banner, and in the 1907 state election, the Kidstonites won twenty-four seats. Because neither they nor Labor nor Robert Philp's Conservative group had a majority, a three-party system operated in the state over the next two years, with no party able to govern alone. Kidston secured some support from Labor on common issues, but the conservative Queensland Legislative Council obstructed much legislation. Kidston tried to appoint more supportive members to the council but the Governor of Queensland Lord Chelmsford refused, leading to Kidston's resignation. Philp formed a government which was promptly denied supply by parliament, and was forced to a new election in February 1908 at which the balance in the parliament was barely altered.

Kidston resumed office and, with the support of Labor, passed reforms including the Parliamentary Bills Referendum Act, which allowed for bills blocked repeatedly in the Council to be submitted to a referendum. Other legislation passed involved pensions, wages boards and electoral reform, but the alliance with Labor came to an end, and later bills, such as to allow private railway construction, were passed with the support of Philp's Conservatives. Increasingly, the Kidstonites and the Conservatives were drawn together and, in October 1908, they merged, reviving the name Liberal Party. Not all Kidstonite parliamentarians accepted the merger, and a group called the "Independent Opposition" emerged, headed by former Attorney General James Blair, which included former Labor leaders Peter Airey and George Kerr.

== Election results ==
Election	Leader	Votes	%	Seats	+/–	Position	Government
1907	William Kidston	62,898	31.88	24 / 72	▼7	▼2nd	Minority government
1908	William Kidston	46,848	25.03	25 / 72	▲1	▲1st	Minority government

== Bibliography ==
- Hughes, Colin A. (1980). The Government of Queensland. University of Queensland Press. ISBN 978-0702215155.
- Murphy, Denis Joseph; Joyce, Roger Bilbrough; Hughes, Colin A., eds. (1970). Prelude to Power: The Rise of the Labour Party in Queensland 1885-1915. Jacaranda Press. ISBN 9780701603120.
- Murphy, Denis Joseph (1975). Murphy, Denis Joseph (ed.). Labor in Politics: the state Labor parties in Australia 1880-1920. University of Queensland Press. pp. 127–228. ISBN 9780702209390.
