= William Kidston =

Australian bookseller and politician (1849–1919)

The Honourable William Kidston
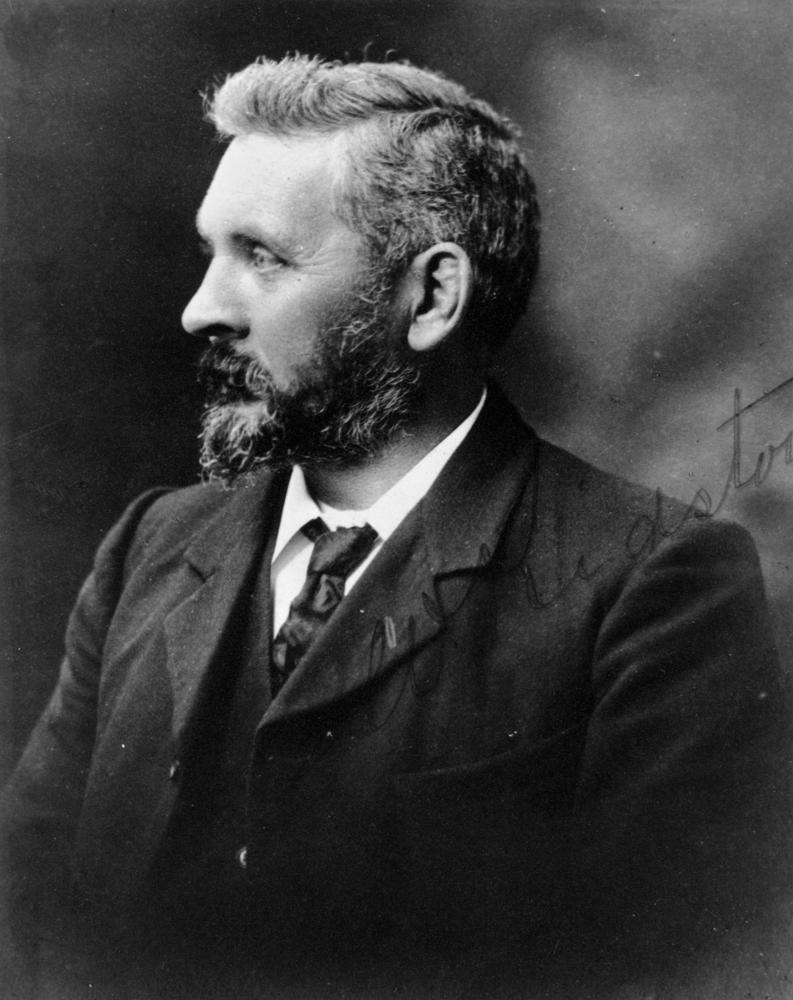

17th Premier of Queensland
- In office 19 January 1906 – 19 November 1907
- Preceded by: Arthur Morgan
- Succeeded by: Robert Philp
- Constituency: Rockhampton
- In office 18 February 1908 – 7 February 1911
- Preceded by: Robert Philp
- Succeeded by: Digby Denham
- Constituency: Rockhampton

19th Treasurer of Queensland
- In office 1 December 1899 – 7 December 1899
- Preceded by: Robert Philp
- Succeeded by: Robert Philp
- Constituency: Rockhampton
- In office 17 September 1903 – 19 November 1907
- Preceded by: Thomas Bridson Cribb
- Succeeded by: Robert Philp
- Constituency: Rockhampton

Leader of the Opposition of Queensland
- In office 19 November 1907 – 15 February 1908
- Preceded by: Robert Philp
- Succeeded by: Robert Philp

Member of the Queensland Legislative Assembly for Rockhampton
- In office 4 April 1896 – 7 February 1911 Serving with George Curtis, Kenneth Grant
- Preceded by: Archibald Archer
- Succeeded by: John Adamson

Personal details
- Born: William Kidston; 17 August 1849 Falkirk, Scotland, UK
- Died: 25 October 1919 (aged 70) Greenslopes, Brisbane, Queensland, Australia
- Resting place: South Rockhampton Cemetery
- Party: Liberals
- Other political affiliations: Labour, Kidstonites
- Spouse: Margaret Johnston Scott (m.1875 d.1910)
- Occupation: Bookseller

William Kidston (17 August 1849 – 25 October 1919) was an Australian bookseller, politician and Premier of Queensland, from January 1906 to November 1907 and again from February 1908 to February 1911.

== Early life ==
William Kidston was born in Falkirk, Scotland on 17 August 1849, the son of an ironworker. He became an apprentice ironmoulder at age 13. He married Margaret Scott in 1874. Dissatisfied with ironmoulding, he emigrated to New South Wales with his family in 1882, and moved again to Queensland, arriving in Rockhampton at 1883.

In Rockhampton, Kidston started a new career as a bookseller. During the early 1890s, growing industrial unrest pitted the newly formed trade union movement against the conservative colonial government led by Thomas McIlwraith in a series of strikes. The 1891 Australian shearers' strike led to the government deploying military forces. Kidston, a member of the local militia, was in strong support of the strikers, and received a court martial when he refused enrolment as a special constable in the anti-strike force.

== Ascent into Parliament ==
The unionists' defeat at the hands of the government prompted the labour movement to aim for political representation in the Parliament of Queensland. The Australian Labour Federation (ALF) sought to repeal the antiquated anti-striking laws that had been used against the strikers. Kidston wrote a poem, entitled The Ballot is the Thing, in support of the unionists' goals. Kidston became the main ALF figure in Rockhampton and campaigned for electoral reform – abolition of plural voting, and extension of the franchise. In addition to the cause of the labour movement, Kidston also supported the separatist organisations in Rockhampton that sought to make Central Queensland a separate colony. Kidston stood unsuccessfully as a separatist candidate for Rockhampton in 1893. In the elections of 1896 he was elected as an endorsed Labor candidate.

In Parliament, Kidston began agitating for a broad coalition of progressive elements to defeat the conservative "Continuous Ministry" now led by Hugh Nelson and achieve electoral reform. Such overtures met with little enthusiasm from either the Labor or Liberal elements. In 1899 he was re-elected and campaigned against Federation of the Australian colonies, believing that the proposed Constitution would disadvantage Queensland financially and disappointed by the provision leaving the creation of new states in the hands of the existing state parliaments. He was again re-elected in 1902, by which stage the separatist movement was dying down.

The faltering Ministerialists were beginning to fracture, and when Robert Philp resigned as premier following a narrow win on an important vote, Kidston briefly found himself Treasurer in 1899 in the world's first parliamentary labour government under Anderson Dawson. The government lasted only a week before it was defeated on the floor of parliament, an experience which convinced Kidston of the necessity of seeking support outside of the ALF proper.

In 1903 an alliance of disaffected Ministerialists, Liberals and the ALF brought down Philp's government and replaced him with Arthur Morgan. Kidston, a close friend of Morgan, again became treasurer. He was, along with William Browne, one of two Labor members of the ministry. After Browne's death in 1904, Kidston became the most senior Labor minister. The parliamentary situation, with equal numbers for both the Morgan-Kidston coalition and the ex-Ministerialists, proved unwieldy, and an election was called. Labor became the largest party in the parliament but Kidston was content to let Morgan retain the dominant role in the coalition.

== Premiership ==
By 1905, Kidston's collaboration with non-Labor elements had provoked criticism from sections of the Labor movement, and when the Labor convention in May endorsed a socialist objective, Kidston protested vigorously. When Hugh Nelson died in January 1906, Morgan took his place as president of the Queensland Legislative Council, which led to Kidston's ascension as premier. In May 1907, he announced the formation of his own political party, to which a majority of the Labor members in parliament declared allegiance.

The early years of Kidston's premiership were dominated by his fight with the conservative Legislative Council, which rejected much of his legislation. In 1908, when Kidston asked the governor, Lord Chelmsford, to appoint more Council members to secure passage of his legislation, Chelmsford refused and Kidston resigned in protest. Robert Philp was commissioned as premier but, without a majority in the Legislative Assembly, could not govern. Chelmsford attempted to dissolve the Assembly, but before he could do so, the Assembly blocked supply. The paralysis was ended when Chelmsford dissolved the Assembly, guaranteed supply in his capacity as governor, and called an election.

Kidston's party won the most seats, and formed a government with Labor's support. Kidston immediately acted to curtail the council's powers. He also proceeded with laws enacting electoral reform and the establishment of Wages Boards. However, he lost Labor's support when he authorised private railway construction in the state, but remained in office, supported by Philp's conservative grouping. In late 1908, presaging the Fusion in the Commonwealth Parliament, Kidston's and Philp's parties merged into one anti-Labor force. After several of his former supporters deserted him, Kidston called another election in October 1909, which his Liberal Party won comfortably.

After lengthy negotiations, Kidston succeeded in ensuring amendments to the Commonwealth Constitution to provide the States with returned customs and excise revenue. He enacted further electoral reform by redistributing electorate boundaries, abolishing dual-member electorates, and entrenching one vote one value, though that would later be undone through malapportionments by subsequent governments. As of 2020, he remains the last person to make a comeback as Premier of Queensland after losing the position.

In 1911, he resigned to take up a position as President of the Land Court, which he maintained until 1919.

He died in October that year in Coorparoo and was buried in South Rockhampton Cemetery.

Political offices
Preceded by Arthur Morgan	Premier of Queensland; 1906–1907	Succeeded by Robert Philp
Preceded by Robert Philp	Premier of Queensland; 1908–1911	Succeeded by Digby Denham
Preceded by Robert Philp	Leader of the Opposition of Queensland; 1907–1908	Succeeded by Robert Philp
Parliament of Queensland
Preceded by Archibald Archer	Member for Rockhampton; 1896–1911; Served alongside: George Curtis, Kenneth Grant	Succeeded by John Adamson
