= Electoral results for the district of Leichhardt (Queensland) =

Queensland, Australia, district election results

This is a list of electoral results for the electoral district of Leichhardt in Queensland state elections.

== Members for Leichhardt ==
Dual member electorate (1860–1873)
Member	Party	Term	Member	Party	Term
Robert Herbert	Unaligned	1860–1863	Charles Royds	Unaligned	1860–1864
Gordon Sandeman	Unaligned	1863–1870	Charles Royds	Unaligned	1860–1864
Gordon Sandeman	Unaligned	1863–1870	Edmund Royds	Unaligned	1864–1868
Gordon Sandeman	Unaligned	1863–1870	Charles Royds	Unaligned	1868–1872
John Scott	Unaligned	1870–1873	Charles Royds	Unaligned	1868–1872
John Scott	Unaligned	1870–1873	Edmund Royds	Unaligned	1872–1873

Single member electorate (1873–1878)
Member	Party	Term
Edmund Royds	Unaligned	1873–1875
Charles Haly	Unaligned	1876–1878

Dual member electorate (1878–1888)
Member	Party	Term	Member	Party	Term
William Sheffield Paul	Unaligned	1878–1879	John Scott	Unaligned	1878–1888
John MacFarlane	Unaligned	1879–1880	John Scott	Unaligned	1878–1888
Albrecht Feez	Unaligned	1880–1883	John Scott	Unaligned	1878–1888
Charles Dutton	Unaligned	1883–1888	John Scott	Unaligned	1878–1888

Single member electorate (1888–1932)
Member	Party	Term
William Sheffield Paul	Unaligned	1888–1893
Herbert Hardacre	Labour	1893–1919
Tom Foley	Labor	1919–1932

== Election results ==
=== Elections in the 1920s ===
1929 Queensland state election: Leichhardt
Party	Candidate	Votes	%	±%
Labor	Tom Foley	1,861	56.0	−5.4
CPNP	George Tuck	1,462	44.0	+5.4
Total formal votes		3,323		
Informal votes				
Turnout				
Labor hold		Swing	−5.4	

1926 Queensland state election: Leichhardt
Party	Candidate	Votes	%	±%
Labor	Tom Foley	2,565	61.4	+2.7
CPNP	Frederick Lodge	1,613	38.6	−2.7
Total formal votes		4,178	99.3	−0.1
Informal votes		30	0.7	+0.1
Turnout		4,208	83.3	+8.8
Labor hold		Swing	+2.7	

1923 Queensland state election: Leichhardt
Party	Candidate	Votes	%	±%
Labor	Tom Foley	2,521	58.7	−1.5
United	Charles Kingston	1,772	41.3	+1.5
Total formal votes		4,293	99.4	+0.4
Informal votes		25	0.6	−0.4
Turnout		4,318	74.5	+2.7
Labor hold		Swing	−1.5	

1920 Queensland state election: Leichhardt
Party	Candidate	Votes	%	±%
Labor	Tom Foley	2,902	60.2	−8.5
Country	Charles Kingston	1,922	39.8	+39.8
Total formal votes		4,824	99.0	−0.1
Informal votes		48	1.0	+0.1
Turnout		4,872	71.8	−3.5
Labor hold		Swing	−8.5	

=== Elections in the 1910s ===
1919 Leichhardt state by-election
Party	Candidate	Votes	%	±%
Labor	Tom Foley	2,152	57.6	−11.1
Primary Producers	Francis Brewer	1,584	42.4	+42.4
Total formal votes		3,736	99.5	+0.4
Informal votes		18	0.5	−0.4
Turnout		3,754		
Labor hold		Swing	−11.1	

1918 Queensland state election: Leichhardt
Party	Candidate	Votes	%	±%
Labor	Herbert Hardacre	2,811	68.7	−31.3
National	William Smout	1,278	31.3	+31.3
Total formal votes		4,089	99.1	
Informal votes		35	0.9	
Turnout		4,124	75.3	
Labor hold		Swing	N/A	

1915 Queensland state election: Leichhardt
Party	Candidate	Votes	%	±%
Labor	Herbert Hardacre	unopposed		
Labor hold		Swing		

1912 Queensland state election: Leichhardt
Party	Candidate	Votes	%	±%
Labor	Herbert Hardacre	1,702	74.8	
Liberal	William Fox	575	25.2	
Total formal votes		2,277	98.4	
Informal votes		36	1.6	
Turnout		2,313	61.9	
Labor hold		Swing		
