= November 1866 Clermont colonial by-election =

By-election held in Queensland, Australia

The Clermont colonial by-election, November 1866 was a by-election held on 13 November 1866 in the electoral district of Clermont for the Queensland Legislative Assembly.

== History ==
On 18 August 1866, Sydney Davis, the member for Clermont, resigned. Roderick Travers won the resulting by-election on 11 September 1866.

However, Travers declined to take the seat and resigned on 12 October 1866. A further by-election on 13 November 1866 was won by George Forbes.

== See also ==
- Members of the Queensland Legislative Assembly, 1863–1867
