= William Sheffield Paul =

Australian politician

William Paul

Member of the Queensland Legislative Assembly for Leichhardt
- In office 14 November 1878 – 24 Mar 1879 Serving with John Scott
- Preceded by: Charles Haly
- Succeeded by: John MacFarlane
- In office 5 May 1888 – 20 May 1893
- Preceded by: Charles Dutton
- Succeeded by: Herbert Hardacre

Personal details
- Born: William Sheffield Paul; October 1832 London, England
- Died: 30 November 1902 (aged 69 or 70) Deal, Kent, England
- Spouse: Maria Smith? (m.1899)
- Occupation: Pastoralist

William Sheffield Paul (1832–1902) was a politician in Queensland, Australia. He was a Member of the Queensland Legislative Assembly.

== Early life ==
William Sheffield Paul was the son of Edward Paul and Jane (née Sheffield) and attended City of London School in England. He migrated to Sydney in 1853 and commenced business with his brother as general merchants under E & W Paul. He migrated in 1862 to Queensland, became involved in Glendarriwill Station, Springsure; and became General shipping manager for Associated Collieries Newcastle, and from 1878; Manager for William Sloane & Co, Brisbane; he was involved in dividing runs commissioner under Crown Lands Act of 1884, Queensland; New South Wales government run appraiser, 1887.

== Politics ==
Paul was a member for Leichhardt in the Queensland Legislative Assembly from 1878 to 1879 and then again from 1888 to 1893.

== Later life ==
Paul was re-appointed as runs commissioner in Queensland, 1894–1897; then Clerk to the Queensland Government Agency, London, 1898–1902. He married Maria Smith on 1 July 1899 and they had a son and a daughter.

Paul died on 30 November 1902.

Parliament of Queensland
Preceded by Charles Haly	Member for Leichhardt; 1878–1879; Served alongside: John Scott	Succeeded by John MacFarlane
Preceded by Charles Dutton	Member for Leichhardt; 1888–1893	Succeeded by Herbert Hardacre
