= Edward Archer (politician) =

Australian politician (1871–1940)

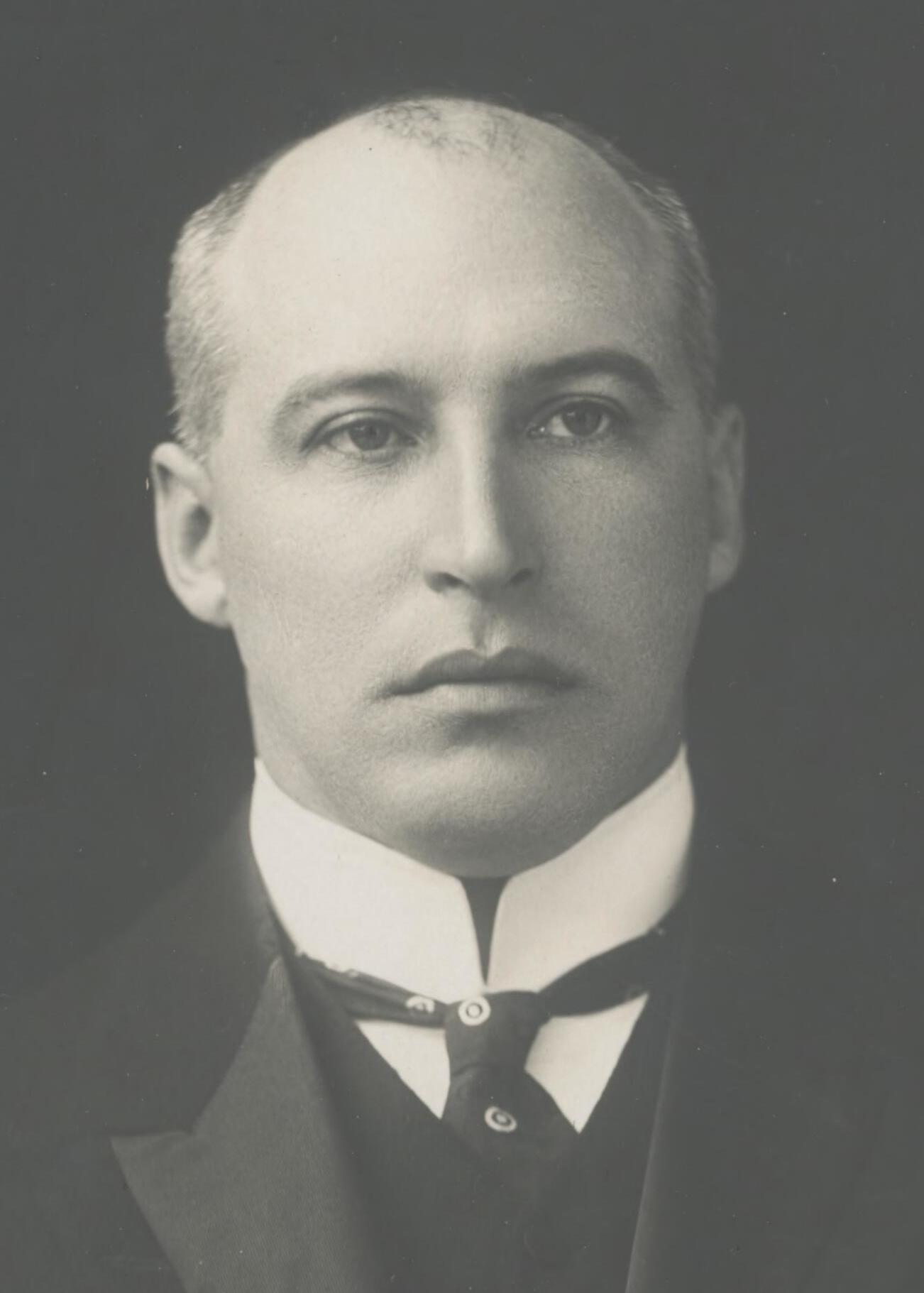

Member of the Australian Parliament for Capricornia
- In office 12 December 1906 – 13 April 1910
- Preceded by: David Thomson
- Succeeded by: William Higgs

Member of the Queensland Legislative Assembly for Normanby
- In office 5 March 1914 – 22 May 1915
- Preceded by: George Fox
- Succeeded by: Jens Peterson

Personal details
- Born: Edward Walker Archer; 12 December 1871 Croydon, England
- Died: 1 July 1940 (aged 68) Rockhampton, Queensland, Australia
- Resting place: The Archer family cemetery, Gracemere
- Party: Anti-Socialist (1906–09); Liberal (1909–10)
- Spouse: Ada Jessie Rhoades
- Relations: The Archer brothers (father and uncles)
- Occupation: Grazier

Edward Walker Archer (12 December 1871 – 1 July 1940) was an Australian politician of Queensland.

== Early life ==
Archer was born on 12 December 1871 in Croydon, Surrey, England. He was the son of David Archer and Susan (née Stubbs). His father, born in Scotland, was one of the Archer brothers – including Charles, Archibald, Thomas, Alexander, and Colin – who engaged in commercial activities in Scotland, Norway and Australia.

Archer was educated in London at Whitgift School and King's College School. He worked with the British India Steam Navigation Company in London from 1891 to 1894, then spent several years on the Canadian Prairies engaged in farming. He relocated to Australia in 1897, joining his brothers Robert and John as a partner in their business activities in Gracemere, Queensland. Archer was manager of the company's station at Targinnie, as well as a small gold mine within the boundaries of their lease. He was chairman of the Port Curtis Dairy Company Ltd from 1904 to 1907 and served terms on the Shire Councils for the Shire of Calliope and the Shire of Fitzroy.

== Politics ==
Archer was elected to the Australian House of Representatives electoral Division of Capricornia as an Anti-Socialist on 12 December 1906, serving until 13 April 1910. When he was sworn as an MP in February 1907, he chose to make an affirmation rather than swear an oath, making him the first member of the House of Representatives to do so.

Later, Archer changed to state politics, serving as member for the electorate of Normanby in the Legislative Assembly of Queensland between 5 March 1914 until the state election on 22 May 1915.

Parliament of Australia
Preceded by David Thomson	Member for Capricornia; 1906–1910	Succeeded by William Higgs
Parliament of Queensland
Preceded by George Fox	Member for Normanby; 1914–1915	Succeeded by Jens Peterson
