= Fowles =

Fowles is the surname of the following people:

- Colin Fowles (1953−1985), Jamaican-American soccer player
- Dennis Fowles (born 1951), Welsh runner
- Duncan Fowles (1893−1969), Australian rugby union player
- Edwin Fowles (1871−1945), Australia barrister and journalist
- Glenys Fowles (born 1941 or 1946), Australian operatic soprano
- Howard Fowles (1894−1973), Australian politician
- Ian Fowles (born 1979), American guitarist
- John Fowles (1926−2005), English writer
- Joseph Fowles (1809−1878), Australian artist and educator
- Leonard Fowles (1870−1939), English organist and choirmaster
- Mitchell Fowles (born 1970), English cricketer
- Nathan Fowles (born 1993), English rugby union player
- Stacie Fowles (born 1979), Canadian writer
- Sylvia Fowles (born 1985), American basketball player
- Will Fowles (born 1978), Australian politician
- William Fowles (1842−1880), Australian politician
