= 1865 Burnett colonial by-election =

The 1865 Burnett colonial by-election was a by-election held on 13 May 1865 in the electoral district of Burnett for the Queensland Legislative Assembly.

== History ==
On 15 April 1865, John Edwards, the member for Burnett, resigned. Charles Haly won the resulting by-election on 13 May 1865.

== See also ==
- Members of the Queensland Legislative Assembly, 1863–1867
