= 1890 Melbourne Cup =

- Melbourne Cup
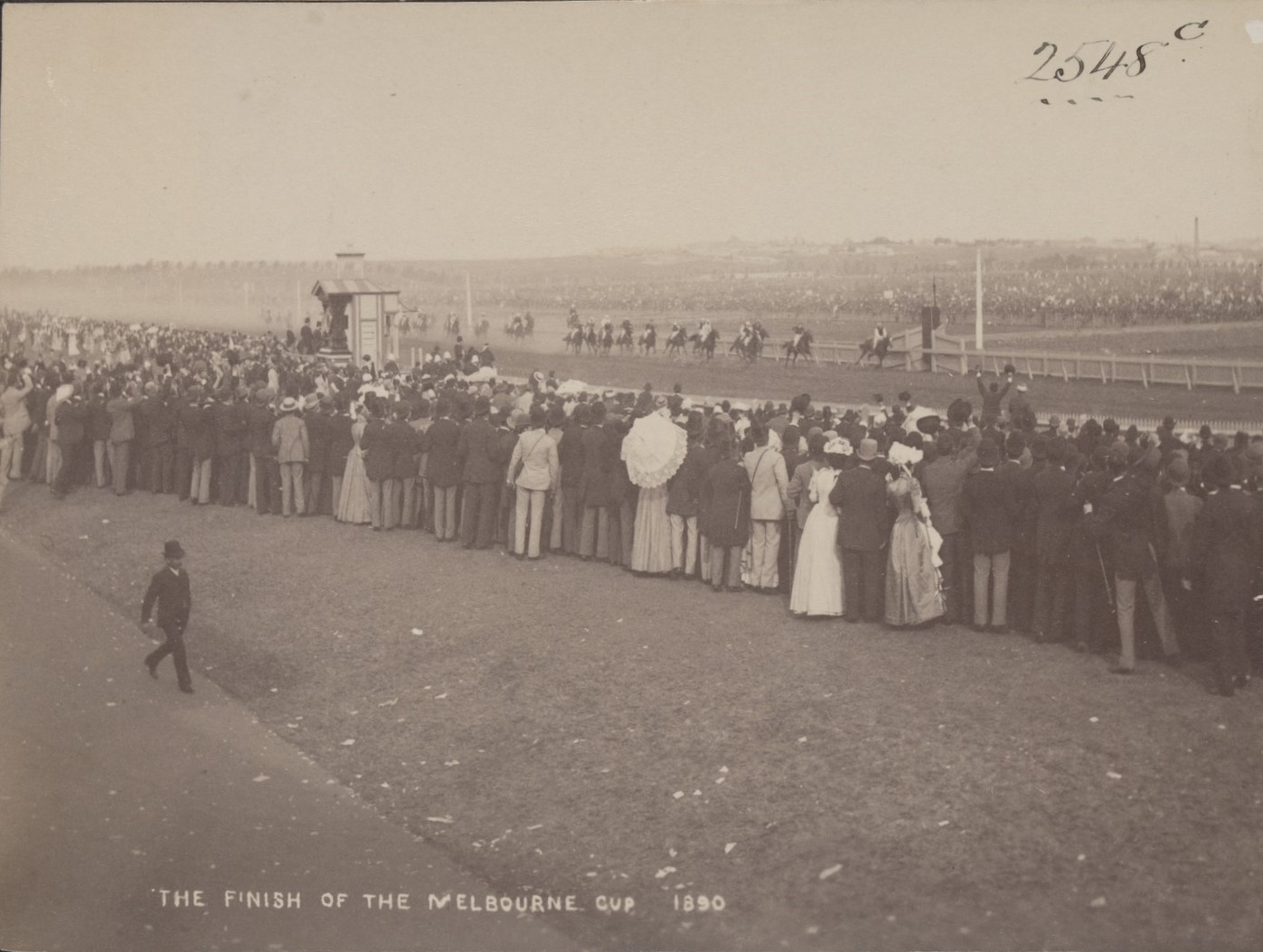
- Photograph of the finish of the race
- Location: Flemington Racecourse
- Date: 4 November 1890
- Distance: 2 miles
- Winning horse: Carbine
- Winning time: 3:28.25
- Final odds: 4/1
- Jockey: Robert Ramage
- Trainer: Walter Hickenbotham
- Owner: Donald Smith Wallace
- Surface: Turf
- Attendance: 85,000

The 1890 Melbourne Cup was a two-mile handicap horse race which took place on Tuesday, 4 November 1890.

This was the largest ever cup field with 39 runners. It was trainer Walter Hickenbotham's second out of four cup wins. The winner, Carbine, carried the top weight of 10 st 5 lb (65.75 kg). The placegetters were:

Place	Name	Jockey	Trainer
1	Carbine	Robert Ramage	Walter Hickenbotham
2	Highborn	J. Egan	
3	Correze	H. Moran	

== See also ==
- Melbourne Cup
- List of Melbourne Cup winners
- Victoria Racing Club
