= Alexander Archer (banker) =

Australian banker (1828–1890)

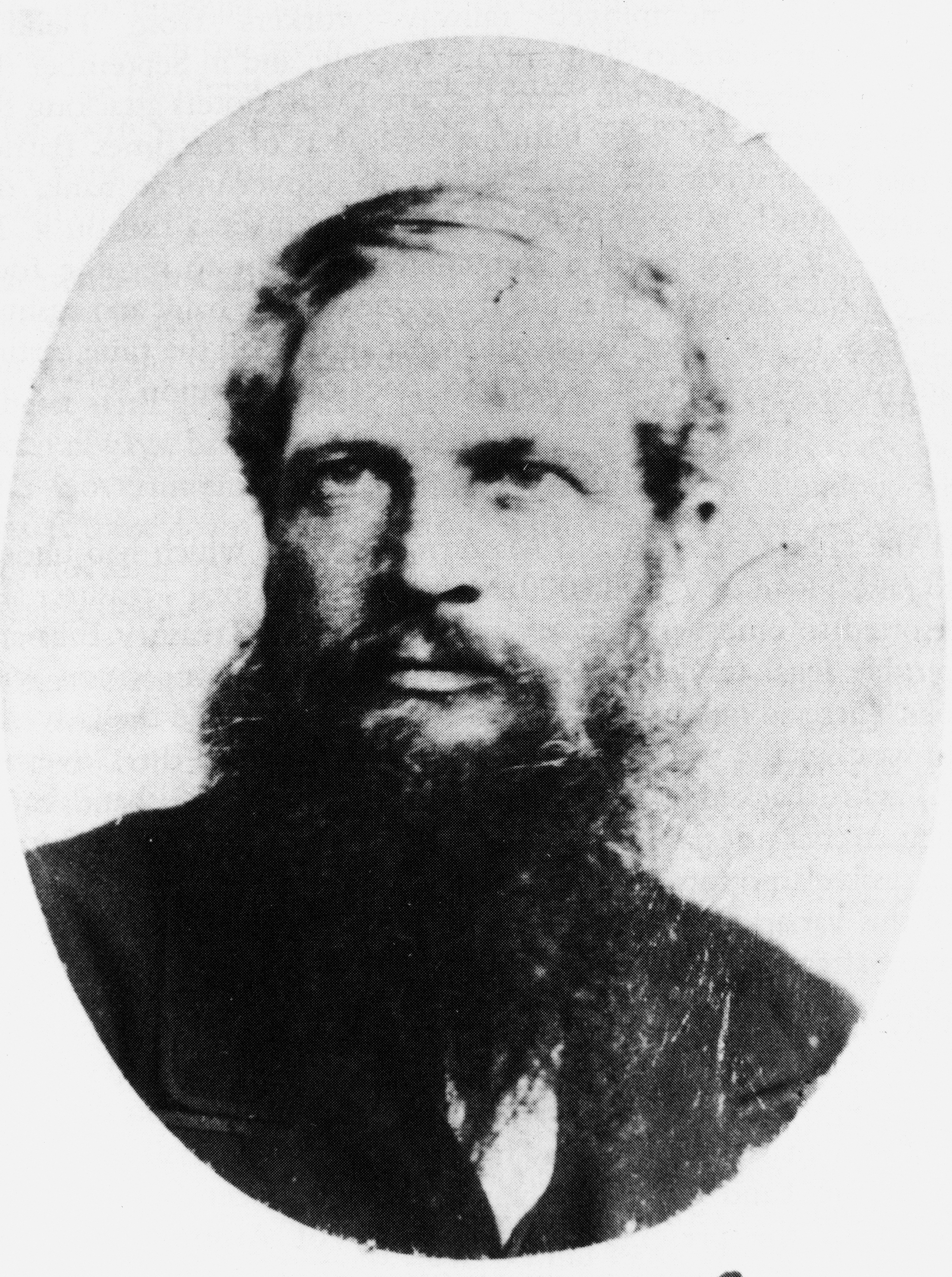
- Alexander 'Sandy' Archer, circa 1885
- Born: 10 April 1828; Larvik, Norway
- Died: 28 February 1890 (aged 61); Torres Strait

Alexander Archer (10 April 1828 – 28 February 1890) was an Australian banker and one of the Archer brothers.

== Early life ==
Alexander Archer was born on 10 April 1828 in Larvik, Norway. He was a younger brother of Archibald Archer (1820–1902) and Thomas Archer (1923–1905).

He was educated at Perth, Scotland.

== Bank of New South Wales ==
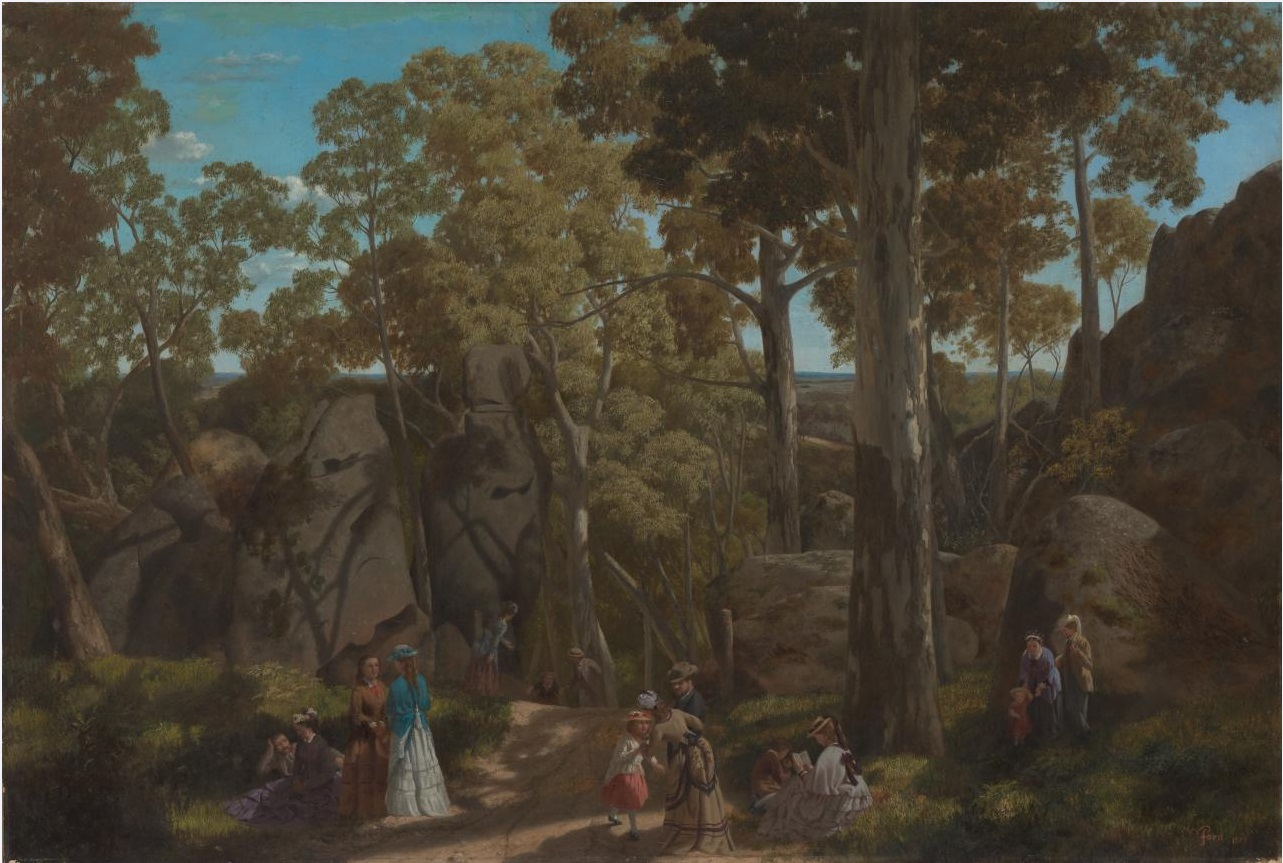
1875 painting of Hanging Rock by William Ford.

He left for Victoria in 1852, where he was appointed agent for the Bank of New South Wales at the goldfield "Ovens" (now Beechworth). He joined the bank on 21 June 1853.

He became manager at Kyneton, Victoria, in 1854, at Brisbane, Queensland, in 1864, and Inspector in 1867.

In 1857, Alexander purchased 100 acres of land in Victoria which included Hanging Rock.

In 1871, he married Mary Louisa (Minnie), the eldest daughter of Sir Robert Ramsay Mackenzie.

== RMS Quetta ==
After thirty-six years' service in the Bank, he left for England by the RMS Quetta, in February 1890, accompanied by his wife, and on 28 February 1890 they both died in the wreck of that ship at the entrance to Torres Strait. They are commemorated with a memorial window in the Quetta Memorial Church on Thursday Island.
