= 1869 Burnett colonial by-election =

The 1869 Burnett colonial by-election was a by-election held on 21 April 1869 in the electoral district of Burnett for the Queensland Legislative Assembly.

== History ==
On 6 April 1869, Robert Mackenzie, former premier and member for Burnett, retired from politics and departed for Europe. Charles Haly won the resulting by-election on 21 April 1869.

== See also ==
- Members of the Queensland Legislative Assembly, 1868–1870
