= George Fox (Australian politician) =

Australian politician

Member of the Queensland Legislative Assembly for Clermont
- In office 19 April 1877 – 5 December 1878
- Preceded by: Oscar de Satge
- Succeeded by: John Stevenson
- In office 13 April 1901 – 27 January 1914
- Preceded by: John Murray
- Succeeded by: Edward Archer

Personal details
- Born: George Fox; 1835 Croydon, Surrey, England
- Died: 27 January 1914 (aged 78-79) Brisbane, Queensland, Australia
- Resting place: South Brisbane Cemetery
- Party: Ministerialist
- Other political affiliations: Opposition
- Spouse: Annie Milburn Elliott (m.1867 d.1924)
- Occupation: Gold miner, Meatworks owner

George Fox was a politician in Queensland, Australia. He was a Member of the Queensland Legislative Assembly.

== Life ==
George Fox was born in 1835 at Croydon, Surrey, England and died in office in Queensland 27 January 1914. Details on George Fox MLA death are available.

== Politics ==
He represented the electoral district of Electoral district of Normanby (Queensland) from 19 Apr 1877 to 27 Jan 1914.

A further obituary from the Telegraph, Brisbane, Tuesday 27 January 1914.

== Family ==
He had three sons and one daughter.

Parliament of Queensland
Preceded by Oscar de Satge	Member for Clermont; 1877–1878	Succeeded by John Stevenson
Preceded by John Murray	Member for Clermont; 1901–1914	Succeeded by Edward Archer
