= Archer brothers =

19th-century European settlers in Queensland, Australia

The Archer brothers were among the earliest European settlers in Queensland, Australia. They were explorers and pastoralists. Seven sons of William Archer, a Scottish timber merchant, they spent varying amounts of time in the colony of New South Wales, mainly in parts of what later became Queensland. A substantial number of locations in Queensland were either named by or for them. They were, in order of birth:

Name	Birth – death	In Australia	Other details
Charles Archer	1813–1862	1841 – ??	Died in Norway
John Archer	1814–1857	1839 – ??	Returned to his occupation as a sailor. Lost at sea.
David Archer	1816–1900	1834 –1852	Did not return to Australia. Father of Australian federal MP Edward Archer.
William Archer	1818–1896	1838 – 1896	Died in Larvik, Norway
Archibald Archer	1820–1902	1860 – c.1897	Became a member of the Legislative Assembly of Queensland in 1867. Died in Larvik, Norway.
Thomas Archer	1823–1905	1838 –1849, 1854–1855, 1872–1880	Became Agent-General for Queensland in 1881. Appointed C.M.G in 1884. Father of William Archer, the theatre critic and translator of Ibsen's works.
Alexander Archer	1828–1890	1851 or 1852–1890	Bank manager, died with his wife Mary Louisa (daughter of Queensland Premier Robert Mackenzie) on the RMS Quetta in 1890
Colin Archer	1832–1921	1853–1861	Became a successful shipbuilder in Norway

== Brisbane River valley ==
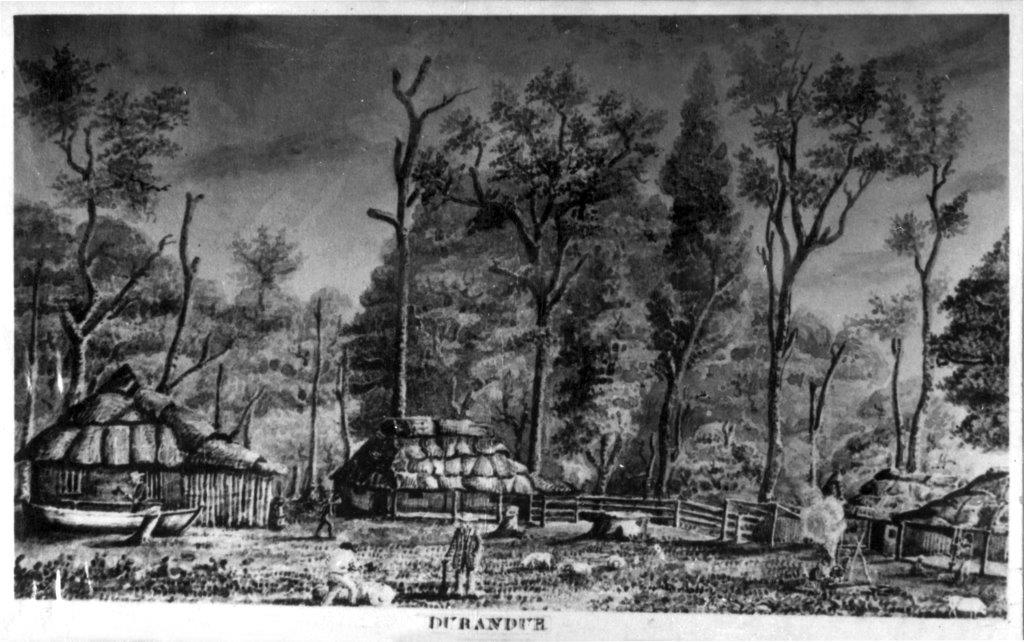
Sketch of Durundur Station by Charles Archer, 1843.

The first of the Archer brothers to settle in Australia was David, who arrived in Sydney in 1834. He was joined by William and Thomas in 1838. Together, they planned to seek pastoral land on the Darling Downs. Delays meant they would be too late to secure good land, so this venture did not proceed. In 1841 David and Thomas, joined by their brother John, travelled to the upper reaches of the Stanley River, an eastern tributary of the Brisbane River. There, near present-day Woodford, they established Durundur Station, a holding of 200 square miles (520 km^{2}), which is equal to 128,000 acres (51,800 ha). Durundur is an aboriginal name for the Moreton Bay ash (Eucalyptus tessellaris) The Archer name is seen in the main street of Woodford, and in Mount Archer about 12 km (7 mi) to the west.

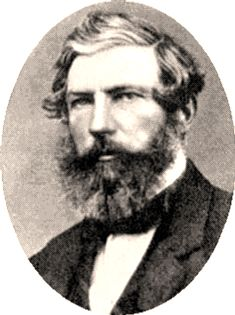
Charles Archer (1813–1862).

Charles Archer arrived in Australia in 1841, and joined his brothers at Durundur in 1843. He was accompanied by the explorer Ludwig Leichhardt, who stayed at Durundur for several months until early 1844. The country at Durundur proved unsuitable for sheep, leading the brothers to take up two runs further west in 1845. One of these was Cooyar, a holding of 71,660 acres (29,000 ha) on Cooyar Creek, a western tributary of the Brisbane River, near present-day Cooyar, 90 kilometres (56 mi) north of Toowoomba, on the New England Highway. The other was Emu Creek, a holding of 32,000 acres (12,950 ha) on Emu Creek, another western tributary of the Brisbane River.

== Burnett region ==
In 1847, Thomas Archer travelled west to the area named Fitzroy Downs by the explorer Thomas Mitchell, near present-day Roma, but did not claim any land. In 1848 he travelled north to the Burnett region, which resulted in two runs being acquired on the Burnett River in the names of David and Thomas Archer. One of these was named Eidsvold, after Eidsvoll, Norway, where the Archer family had land holdings. The present day town of Eidsvold was named for the nearby property. The other, named Coonambula, was south of Eidsvold on St John Creek, a tributary of the Burnett River.

Near the site of Eidsvold Station is present day Tolderodden Conservation Park. The association of the Archers with this name is the fact that Colin Archer was born in a house named Tollerodden, in Norway.

Although not on the Burnett River, Maryborough was the main port for the Burnett region, particularly for the export of wool. One of the houses of St Mary's College, Maryborough is named Archer in honour of the contribution of the pioneering family to the Burnett region.

== Fitzroy River ==
In 1853, Charles and William Archer were the first Europeans to explore the Fitzroy River, which they named in honour of Sir Charles FitzRoy, Governor of the Colony of New South Wales. They explored the river valley and marked proposed boundaries for a new run before returning to the Burnett region. In 1855 the brothers began farming a run on the Fitzroy River, naming it Gracemere Station in honour of Thomas Archer's bride, Grace, whom he had married in Scotland in 1853. Gracemere homestead was built in 1858, overlooking a shallow lagoon known variously as Padgole, Farris, and Gracemere. The present-day town of Gracemere was named for the station.

In 1860 Archibald Archer joined his brothers at Gracemere. At first both cattle and sheep were raised, but during the early 1870s the station switched entirely to cattle. The city of Rockhampton now stands on part of the original Gracemere run.

Mount Archer National Park is based on Mount Archer, near Rockhampton. The mountain was named in honour of Charles and William Archer, who had named the Berserker Range and Mount Sleipner (both names derived from Norse mythology) in 1853.

=== Gracemere in Google Maps ===
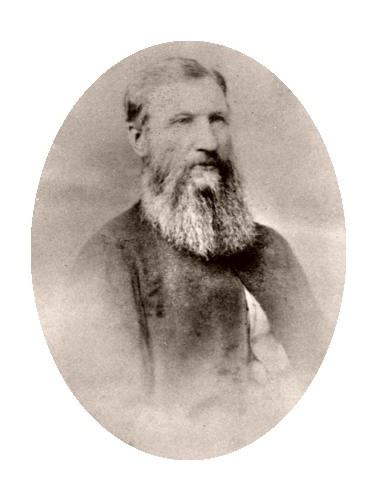
Archibald Archer (1820–1902).

Google Maps shows the central point of Gracemere as near the intersection of Lawrie St (Gavial Gracemere Rd) and Platen St. About 1,000 metres to the north is the intersection of Capricorn Highway and Archer Rd. With satellite imaging enabled, a tree-lined drive can be observed opposite Archer Rd. This extends west for about 2,000 metres to the Gracemere homestead buildings, on the eastern shore of the lagoon.

== Other details ==
John Archer was captain of the schooner "Letitia" in 1844, and then the schooner "Clarence". In 1847 Captain Archer acquired a job managing Lucknow Station in Gippsland, Victoria and his first wife was buried there the same year. John met his brother Thomas in San Francisco in 1848. John was captain of the "Harriett Nathan" and Thomas had gone to the California goldfields. From 1852 to 1854 John - "Captain Jack" - commanded the barque "Fair Tasmanian" on the Hobart-Twofold Bay route. He then captained the brig "Retriever" until he and his third wife were lost when the "Retriever" is believed to have foundered off the coast of New Zealand after departing Newcastle, Australia.

Archibald Archer was a member of the Queensland Legislative Assembly from 1867 to 1869, and from 1879 to 1895. He served as colonial treasurer and minister for education from 1882 to 1883. He was an advocate of the idea of having Central Queensland declared a separate state. In 1870 he accepted the job of Agent-General for Queensland, but resigned when he realised that his plan to present a petition from the advocates of separation to the Colonial Office was inconsistent with his holding of that job. He was replaced in early 1872 by Richard Daintree.

Thomas Archer was Agent-General for Queensland from 1881 to 1884 and from 1888 to 1890. He was appointed C.M.G. in 1884. While serving as Agent-General he published pamphlets designed to foster interest in Queensland.

Colin Archer was the first to sail a vessel – Ellida, a ketch of about twelve tons – up the Fitzroy River to the present site of Rockhampton. He was met by Charles, riding his horse Sleipner, on 1 September 1855. This event is commemorated by a statue of horse and rider on the river bank in Rockhampton. During later life he became a successful shipbuilder in Norway, where he built the Fram, the ship in which Fridtjof Nansen made the successful exploration of the North Polar Sea in 1893 – 1896. Jack Earl's boat, "Kathleen Gillett", which he sailed in the inaugural Sydney to Hobart yacht race on Boxing Day 1945, was based on designs by Colin Archer.

== See also ==
- Political families of Australia
