= Robert Ramage =

Robert Ramage may refer to:

- Robert Ramage (jockey) (1865−1925), Australian jockey
- Robert Ramage (chemist) (1935−2019), Scottish chemist

== See also ==
- Rob Ramage (George Robert Ramage, born 1959), Canadian ice hockey player
