= Charles Fitzsimmons =

Charles Fitzsimmons may refer to:

- Charles Fitzsimmons (politician) (1802–1876), member of the Queensland Legislative Assembly
- Charles B. Fitzsimons (1924–2001), actor and movie producer
