= John Stevenson (Queensland politician) =

Australian politician

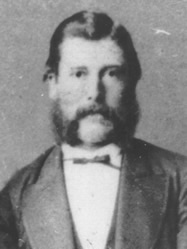

Member of the Queensland Legislative Assembly for Clermont
- In office 4 February 1876 – 22 November 1878
- Preceded by: Charles Graham
- Succeeded by: William Fowles
- In office 5 May 1888 – 6 May 1893
- Preceded by: Donald Wallace
- Succeeded by: John Cross

Member of the Queensland Legislative Assembly for Normanby
- In office 5 December 1878 – 5 May 1888
- Preceded by: George Fox
- Succeeded by: John Murray

Personal details
- Born: John Stevenson; 1843 Perth, Scotland
- Died: 15 August 1912 (aged 68–69) Brisbane, Queensland, Australia
- Resting place: South Brisbane Cemetery
- Spouse: Jane Palmer
- Occupation: Cattle station manager

John Stevenson (1843 – 15 August 1912) was a politician in Queensland, Australia. He was a Member of the Queensland Legislative Assembly.

== Politics ==
John Stevenson was elected to the Queensland Legislative Assembly for Clermont in a by-election on 4 February 1876. He held the seat until the 1878 colonial election.

He was then elected in Normanby on 5 December 1878, which he held until 5 May 1888 (the 1888 election).

He was then elected again in Clermont on 5 May 1888, which he held until 6 May 1893 (the 1893 election).

Stevenson died in Brisbane in 1912 and was buried in South Brisbane Cemetery.

Parliament of Queensland
Preceded by Charles Graham	Member for Clermont; 1876–1878	Succeeded by William Fowles
Preceded by George Fox	Member for Normanby; 1878–1888	Succeeded by John Murray
Preceded by Donald Wallace	Member for Clermont; 1888–1893	Succeeded by John Cross
