= Electoral district of Springsure =

Springsure Queensland—Legislative Assembly
- State: Queensland
- Created: 1872
- Abolished: 1877
- Namesake: Springsure, Queensland

Springsure was a Legislative Assembly electorate in the state of Queensland.

== History ==
Springsure was created by the Electoral Districts Act in 1872, but the seat existed for only the one Parliament before being abolished in the 1877 redistribution.

== Members ==
The following people represented Springsure:

Member	Party	Term
John Scott		4 November 1873 – 14 November 1878

== See also ==
- Electoral districts of Queensland
- Members of the Queensland Legislative Assembly by year
- Category:Members of the Queensland Legislative Assembly by name
