= 1888 Melbourne Cup =

Annual horse race in Victoria, Australia

- Melbourne Cup
- Location: Flemington Racecourse
- Date: 6 November 1888
- Distance: 2 miles
- Winning horse: Mentor
- Winning time: 3:30.75
- Final odds: 7/1
- Jockey: Mick O'Brien
- Trainer: Walter Hickenbotham
- Owner: Donald Smith Wallace
- Surface: Turf
- Attendance: 100,000

The 1888 Melbourne Cup was a two-mile handicap horse race which took place on Tuesday, 6 November 1888.

This year was the twenty-eighth running of the Melbourne Cup. This year the VRC lifted the sweepstakes for the Melbourne Cup making the Cup the most valuable race in the world at the time. This was the first of four Melbourne Cup wins for trainer Walter Hickenbotham.

Mentor’s Melbourne Cup was known as the Centennial Cup in the hundredth anniversary year of European settlement in Australia. Melbourne was at the height of a property boom: it was a time of extravagance and no expense spared. The VRC lifted the prize for the race by 3000 sovereigns making this the richest handicap race in the world. With the prize money, Mentor’s owner Donald Wallace purchased the rising New Zealand champion colt, Carbine, and raced him for the rest of his turf career. Trainer Walter Hickenbotham, born in Bathurst NSW, had only recently moved to Melbourne. Mentor was the first of his four Melbourne Cup winners. This was Mick O’Brien’s second Melbourne Cup win, having been successful on Sheet Anchor in 1885. O’Brien became the regular rider of Carbine until chronic asthma forced his retirement from the saddle in 1890. Mentor was a half-brother of Insomnia, dam of the great race mare, Wakeful. ( VRC WEBSITE )

In the days leading up to the 1888 Melbourne Cup, an Ipswich horse was involved in one of the biggest fleecing operations ever. I told a version of this story live on Ipswich’s West Bremer Radio.

For the uninitiated about “fleecing”, instead of removing the fleece from a mob of sheep, fleecing is removing money from a mob of unwitting punters..

In 1888 Mr William Moffatt, previously from Rockhampton, was the lessee of two very good Queensland horses that he took to Melbourne for the rich races there. Moffatt was already well known in Melbourne football circles having played with Geelong in the 1870s. ( https://historyoutthere.com/2025/11/02/1888-melbourne-cup-fleecing-of-lord-headington/ )

This is the list of placegetters for the 1888 Melbourne Cup. The Placings were

OWNER _ HORSE COLOUR /SEX _HORSE NAME _AGE _ BREEDING _ WEIGHT _ RIDER

D. S. Wallace's b h MENTOR, 4 yrs., by Swiveller— Nightmare, 8 st. 3 lb. . . (M. O'Brien) 1

S. L. West's br h TRADITION, 4 yrs., by Richmond— Bridal Wreath, 6 st. 12 lb. (Including 1 lb. over) (Aspiunall) 2

S. O. Cook's ch g THE YEOMAN, 5 yrs., by The Englishman— Springtime, 7 st. 8 lb. . .(Ramage) 3

W. Gannon's b or br h THE AUSTRALIAN PEEK, 4 yrs., 9 st. 8 lb (E. Power) 0

J. O. Inglis's b h MALUA, aged, 9 st, 7 lb... .. (Sir. J. O. Inglis) 0

J. White's b h CARLYON, 4 yrs., 9sL3Ib. (Hales) 0

W. Gannon's br h ARSENAL, 6 yrs., 9st (Ivimy) 0

H. Strickland's b h BEN BOLT, aged, 8 st. 9 lb.(Ettridge) 0

W, T. Jones's b h BRAVO, 5 yrs., 8 st. 5 lb.(Bowes) 0

& G. Cook's b h CYCLOPS, 6 yrs., 8sL 31b.(Dalton) 0

IL Ori's b h RECALL, 6 yrs., (including 10 lb.ponalty) 8 st. 3 lb (T. Sanders) 0

?. Haines's ch m SPADE GUINEA, 6 yrs., 8 st.1 lb (Harris) 0

T. Sampson's g g ARISTOCRAT, 5 yrs.. 8 st(Smith) 0

Husband and Nicliolls's b h DIOR SWIVELLER,4 yrs., 7 st. 10 lb. .. .. .. (A. Smith) 0

M. O'Slianassy's br h CHICAGO, 6 yrs., (including 10 lb. ponalty) 7 st. 9 lb (Campbell) 0

E. Mitcholson's bl b WHAHAWAI, 4 yrs, 7 st.' lb (Brown) 0

M. Welcliin's ch h LORD HEADINGTON, 4 yrs.,7 St. 5 lb. ... (Tomlin) 0

W. Gannon's br o MELOS, 3 yrs., 7 st. 6 lb... ., (Dunhey) 0

J. White's br g ENSIGN, 3 yrs., 7 st. 6 lb...' .. (Huxley) 0

n. Oxonhara's ch h PHAON, 5 yrs, 7 st. 3 lb.. . (Delaney) 0

W. Gannon's b or br h TOUCHSTONE, 4 yrs.,7 st. 3 lb. (Fielder) 0

C. Collins's ch h NEWMASTER, 5 yrs., (including 3 lb. penalty), 7st. 21b. . . ... (Hayes) 0

T. Sampson s bf MAGGIE, 3 yrs,, (including 6 1b.penalty) 7 st .. . . ' (Archer) 0

J. Murray's br h KING OF THE WEST, 6 yrs.,7 st (including 3 lb. over) . . . . (Goad) 0

J. Barnard's b h E. D„ 6 yrs., 7 st. 1 lb. (including 7 lb. over) (King) 0

Sir W. J. Clarke's br h MENOTTI, 8 yrs., 6 st.10 lb. (Including 3 lb. over) . . (Morrison) 0

a. T. Cbirnslde's bl f BERYL, 3 yrs., 6 st 7 lb.(Bloomfield) 0

S. Miller's b f ILEX, 3 yrs., Opt. 7 lb... (Osborne) 0

( https://news.google.com/newspapers?nid=MDQ-9Oe3GGUC&dat=18881107&printsec=frontpage&hl=en )

== Prizemoney ==
First prize £3,984, second prize £600, third prize £300.

== See also ==
- Melbourne Cup
- List of Melbourne Cup winners
- Victoria Racing Club
- Australian Racing Hall of Fame
