= John Murray (pastoralist) =

Australian politician

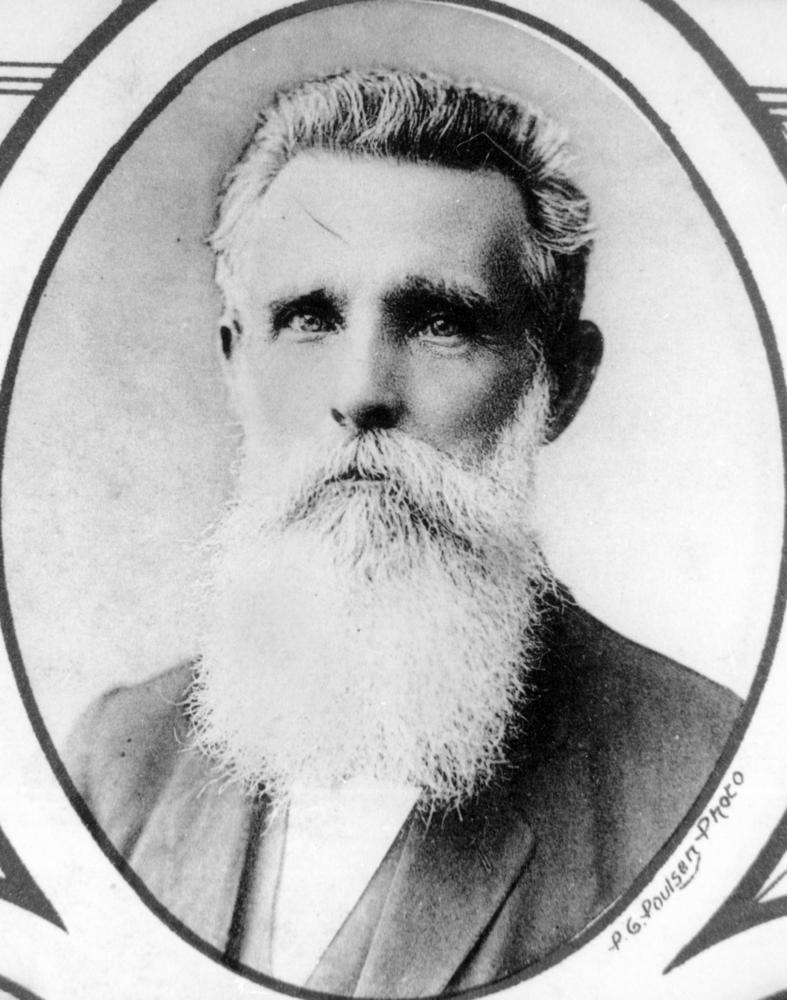
- John Murray, May 1901

Member of the Queensland Legislative Assembly for Normanby
- In office 19 May 1888 – 1 March 1901
- Preceded by: John Stevenson
- Succeeded by: George Fox

Member of the Queensland Legislative Council
- In office 12 March 1901 – 13 November 1903

Personal details
- Born: John Murray; 15 August 1837 Mauchline, Ayrshire, Scotland
- Died: 18 November 1917 (aged 80) Longreach, Queensland, Australia
- Resting place: Toowong Cemetery
- Party: Ministerialist
- Spouse(s): Jane Elizabeth Hartley (m. 1873 d. 1877), Margaret McGavin (m. 1882)
- Occupation: Grazier, Sugarcane farmer

John Murray (15 August 1837 – 18 November 1917) was a pastoralist and politician in Australia. He was a Member of the Queensland Legislative Assembly and the Queensland Legislative Council.

== Early life ==
Born in Mauchline in Ayrshire to coachman Peter Murray and Jean, née Witherspoon, he was educated locally and emigrated to the Victorian goldfields around 1852. In 1862 he and his brothers established a cattle shipping business in New South Wales, operating between Newcastle and New Zealand, although the latter's prohibition of cattle imports in 1864 due to pleuropneumonia in Australia ended the venture. In December of that year Murray relocated to Rockhampton, selecting around 2,000 acres (810 ha) of land and growing sugarcane from 1872.

On 1 September 1873, Murray married Jane Elizabeth Hartley; they had three children, but Jane died in 1877. On 3 January 1882 Murray married Margaret McGavin, with whom he had four children.

== Political life ==
John Murray was an early member of the Gogango Divisional Board, serving as chairman on three occasions.

In 1888 he was elected to the Legislative Assembly of Queensland for Normanby, supporting Thomas McIlwraith's group. He resigned from parliament in November 1903 to contest the Australian Senate, but he was unsuccessful. During the campaign Murray described Labor's control of the balance of power in the Australian Parliament as "government from the gutter". His own politics were largely conservative, although he long prevaricated on the issue of separation for Central Queensland.

In 1890 he finally declared his support for separation and declined a seat in the Griffith-McIlwraith coalition ministry. He entered cabinet in 1898 as secretary for railways and public works under T. J. Byrnes and later James Dickson.

A plateau near Gayndah was named Mount Murray by the Hon. John Murray, Minister for Railways and Works, when he and others inspected the land in January 1899. By personally inspecting the land he finally overcame squatter opposition to an extension to Gayndah of what eventually became the Mungar to Monto railway line. Six years later the plateau had become known as the Binjour Plateau.

In 1901 he was appointed to the Queensland Legislative Council and served as secretary for public instruction until August 1902 and minister without portfolio under Robert Philp until his retirement in 1903.

== Later life ==
Following his defeat in the federal election he retired to return to pastoralism, purchasing Beaconsfield East and West stations at Ilfracombe in 1911. He later lived mostly at his residence Tullibardine at 148 Merthyr Road, New Farm, Brisbane.

Around September–October 1917, John Murray travelled to his property Beaconsfield Station in the Longreach district. On 18 November 1917 he died in the private hospital of Dr Michod in Longreach after a short illness, aged 76 years old. He was buried in Longreach Cemetery but was re-interred in Toowong Cemetery on 22 March 1919.

Parliament of Queensland
Preceded by John Stevenson	Member for Normanby; 1888–1901	Succeeded by George Fox
