= John MacFarlane (Queensland politician) =

Australian politician

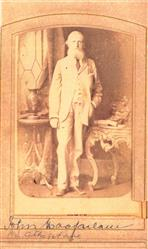

Member of the Queensland Legislative Assembly for Rockhampton
- In office 20 November 1877 – 15 November 1878
- Preceded by: Charles Buzacott
- Succeeded by: William Rea

Member of the Queensland Legislative Assembly for Leichhardt
- In office 17 April 1879 – 10 April 1880 Serving with John Scott
- Preceded by: William Paul
- Succeeded by: Albrecht Feez

Personal details
- Born: John MacFarlane; 1823 Glasgow, Scotland
- Died: 10 April 1880 (aged 57) Rockhampton, Queensland, Australia
- Resting place: South Rockhampton Cemetery
- Spouse(s): Mary Donovan (m.1946), Margaret O'Brien (m.1965)
- Occupation: Stock and station agent

John MacFarlane (1823 – 10 April 1880) was a member of the Queensland Legislative Assembly.

== Biography ==
MacFarlane was born in Glasgow, Scotland, the son of David Macfarlane and his wife Margaret (née Gibb). He arrived in Victoria around 1840 where he engaged in Squatting pursuits. In 1865 he moved to Queensland and as a member of a Victorian firm, took up Oakey Creek run on the Mackenzie River in Central Queensland. Like most stations in the area it proved unsuitable for sheep and after four years he moved to Rockhampton where he established a successful stock and station agent.

He died of diabetes in April 1880 and was buried in the South Rockhampton Cemetery.

== Public career ==
MacFarlane was an alderman in Rockhampton from 1874 until 1880 including being the mayor from 1876 to 1878. He entered state politics as the member for Rockhampton in 1877 following the resignation of Charles Buzacott. He resigned from the assembly a year later but in 1879 he became the member for Leichhardt and held the seat until his death in 1880.

Parliament of Queensland
Preceded by Charles Buzacott	Member for Rockhampton; 1877–1878	Succeeded by William Rea
Preceded by William Paul	Member for Leichhardt; 1879–1880; Served alongside: John Scott	Succeeded by Albrecht Feez
