= Joe Lesina =

Australian politician

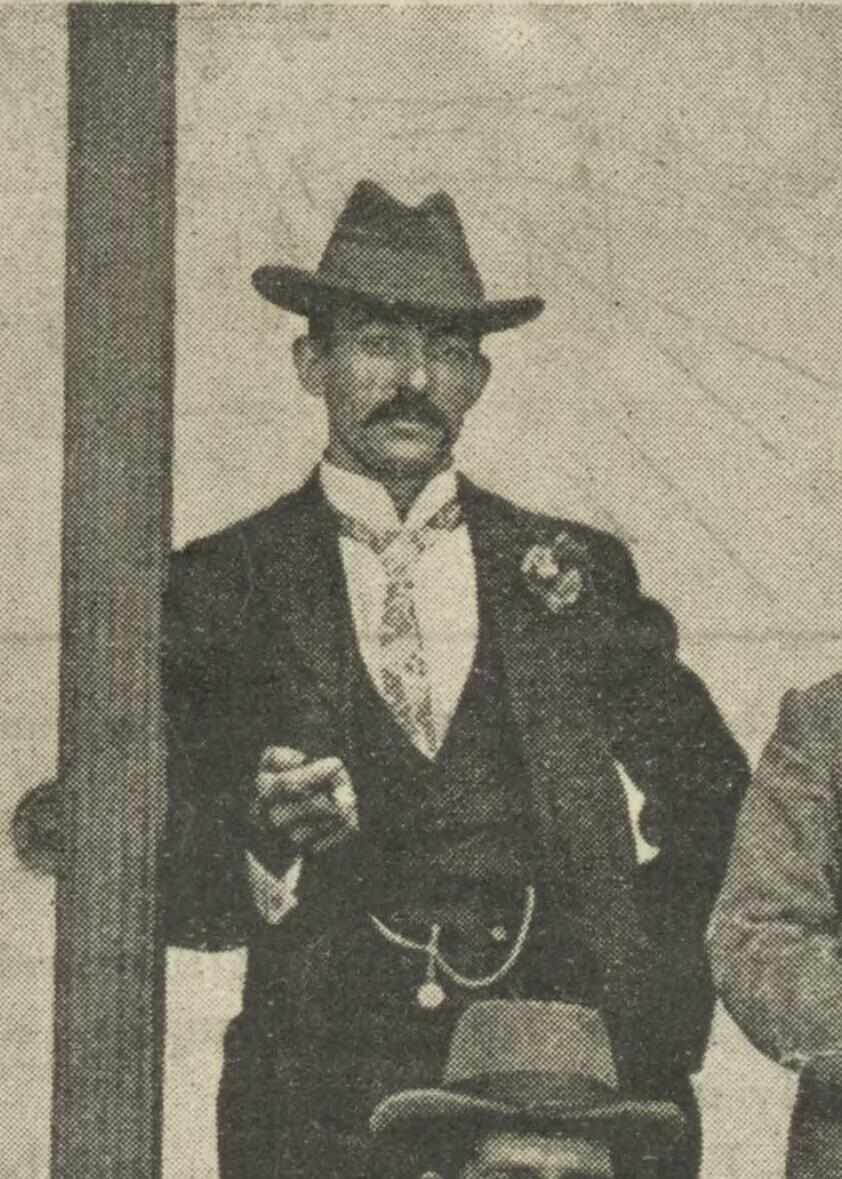
- Lesina in 1900

Member of the Queensland Legislative Assembly for Clermont
- In office 11 Mar 1899 – 27 Apr 1912
- Preceded by: John Cross
- Succeeded by: Seat abolished

Personal details
- Born: Vincent Bernard Joseph Lesina; 1 November 1869 Araluen Goldfield, New South Wales, Australia
- Died: 14 July 1955 (aged 85) Parramatta, New South Wales, Australia
- Resting place: Rookwood Cemetery
- Party: Labour
- Spouse: Phoebe Eleanor Cullen (m.1895 d.1949)
- Occupation: Journalist

Vincent Bernard Joseph Lesina (1 November 1869 – 14 July 1955) was a journalist and member of the Queensland Legislative Assembly.

== Biography ==
Lesina was born in the goldfields of Araluen, New South Wales, to parents Alexander Lesina, who was of Italian/Swiss origin, and his wife Margaret (née McGrath), and was educated at St Benedict's school and orphanage in Sydney. By 1883, he had accompanied his mother to Auckland, New Zealand, where he worked at a sawmill and as a seaman.

By 1887, he was back in New South Wales, working as a newsboy and apprentice signwriter, and for the rest of his working career he was a journalist, employed at various newspapers in both New South Wales and Queensland.

On the 27 March 1895, he married Phoebe Eleanor Cullen (died 1949) in Sydney, and they had three sons. He died in Parramatta in 1955 and was buried in Rookwood Cemetery.

== Political career ==
At the 1899 Queensland colonial elections, Lesina, standing in the seat of Clermont for the Labour Party, defeated the sitting member, John Cross, who stood for re-election as an "unpledged" Labour candidate.

Described as a "nervy, restless dark little man of passing good looks", Lesina was a speaker possessed of considerable wit, biting sarcasm and devastating invective, along with a capacity for detailed research and factual inventiveness. He advocated a White Australia policy and even "white Empire". He never rose to any prominence in the Labour Party and his only notable contribution to reform was the adoption of a policy to abolish of capital punishment at the Labor-in-Politics Convention in 1910, which was eventually enacted in 1922.

Lesina was a stickler for Labour policy and was twice censured by the party during his time in parliament for his refusal to surrender those principles. He was expelled from the :Labour Party in 1909 because of disagreements with Labour leader David Bowman about the liquor trade and certain aspects of nationalisation. Lesina retired from politics in 1912. An "utterly irreconcilable freelance", he was uncontrollable by party discipline.

Parliament of Queensland
Preceded by John Cross	Member for Clermont; 1899–1912	Abolished
