= Sydney Davis (Australian politician) =

Australian politician

Member of the Queensland Legislative Assembly for Clermont
- In office 18 March 1865 – 18 August 1866
- Preceded by: New seat
- Succeeded by: Roderick Travers

Personal details
- Born: Sydney Bevan Davis; 1829 Winterbourne Abbas, Dorsetshire, England
- Died: 27 June 1884 (aged 54-55) Rockhampton, Queensland, Australia
- Resting place: South Rockhampton Cemetery
- Spouse: Emily Mary Anne Ariel (m.1865)
- Education: University of Oxford
- Occupation: Pastoralist

Sydney Bevan Davis (1829–1884) was a pastoralist and politician in Queensland, Australia. He was a Member of the Queensland Legislative Assembly.

== Early life ==
Sydney Bevan Davis was born in Dorsetshire, England, in 1829, the second son of Lieutenant-Colonel John Davis, of the Dorsetshire Militia, who for many years was Master of Foxhounds for Queen Victoria. Sydney Davis was a lieutenant in his father's regiment. He was educated at the University of Oxford. He immigrated to Queensland in 1861 with considerable capital that he invested in a pastoral property at Peak Downs called Peak Vale Station and also had an interest in the Craven Downs Station.

== Politics ==
Under the Additional Members Act 1864, the seats of Clermont, Kennedy, Maryborough, Mitchell, Rockhampton and Warrego were created. By-elections to fill the new seats were held on 1 February 1865 (Maryborough and Rockhampton), on 18 March 1865 (Clermont and Kennedy) and on 25 March 1865 (Mitchell and Warrego). Sydney Davis was elected to the Queensland Legislative Assembly in Clermont on 18 March 1865. On 18 August 1866, Sydney Davis resigned, believed to be linked to the difficult conditions caused by the drought on his pastoral holdings. Roderick Travers won the resulting by-election on 11 September 1866; however, he declined to take the seat and resigned on 12 October. A further by-election on 13 November 1866 was won by George Forbes.

== Later life ==
After the difficulties he faced with the drought on his Peak Downs properties, he retired to Rockhampton. He died on Friday 27 June 1884 following an illness of several weeks. He was buried in the Church of England section of the South Rockhampton Cemetery on Saturday 28 June 1884.

== See also ==
- Members of the Queensland Legislative Assembly, 1863–1867

Parliament of Queensland
New seat	Member for Clermont; 1865–1866	Succeeded by Roderick Travers
