= George Forbes (Queensland politician) =

Australian politician (1828–1881)

Member of the Queensland Legislative Assembly for Clermont
- In office 13 November 1866 – 20 June 1867
- Preceded by: Roderick Travers
- Succeeded by: Charles Fitzsimmons

Personal details
- Born: George Edward Forbes; 8 August 1828 Edinburgh, Scotland
- Died: 2 July 1881 (aged 52) Leith, Scotland
- Spouse: Louisa Lilias Trotter (m.1868)
- Occupation: Pastoralist

George Edward Forbes (1828 – 1881) was a Scots-born politician who served in Queensland, Australia. He was a Member of the Queensland Legislative Assembly.

== Biography ==
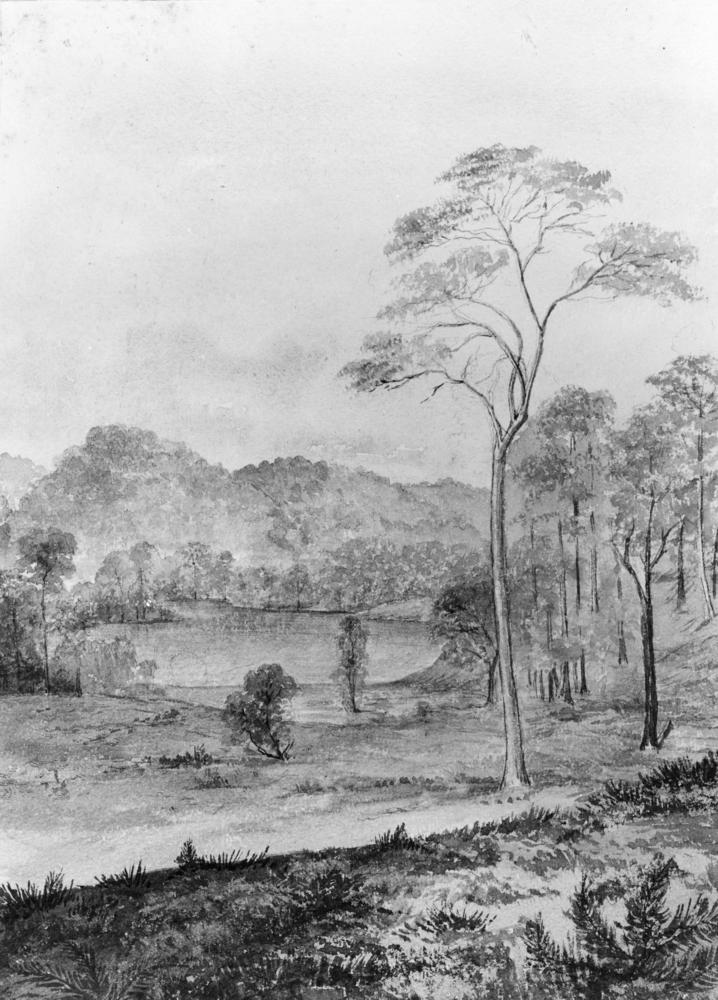
StateLibQld 1 86452 Painting by L. Forbes of the Brisbane River near Chinaman's Flat, 1873

George Forbes was born on 8 August 1828 in Edinburgh, Scotland. He settled in Australia in about 1849, becoming a prominent squatter before forming a partnership with John Balfour in 1854 in Colinton, the Brisbane Valley, buying the business in 1862.

He returned to Scotland and, in 1868, married Louisa Lillias Trotter at St John's Episcopalian Church, Edinburgh, who was an artist and the daughter of an ancient Scottish family. Her father was Archibald Trotter of Dreghorn Castle of Midlothian in Edinburgh. They returned to Colinton after their marriage. Their daughter Mabel Christian Forbes married Sir Thomas Barnby Whitson who served as Lord Provost of Edinburgh 1929 to 1932. Mabel died in 1971.

Forbes returned to Scotland and died suddenly on 2 July 1881 in Leith, Edinburgh, Scotland.

== Political career ==
He was elected in a by-election and represented the electoral district of Clermont from 13 November 1866 to 20 June 1867 in the Legislative Assembly of Queensland. He unsuccessfully contested the seat of Kennedy in the 1871 Queensland election.

Parliament of Queensland
Preceded by Roderick Travers	Member for Clermont; 1866–1867	Succeeded by Charles Fitzsimmons
