= Lucerne on Fernberg =

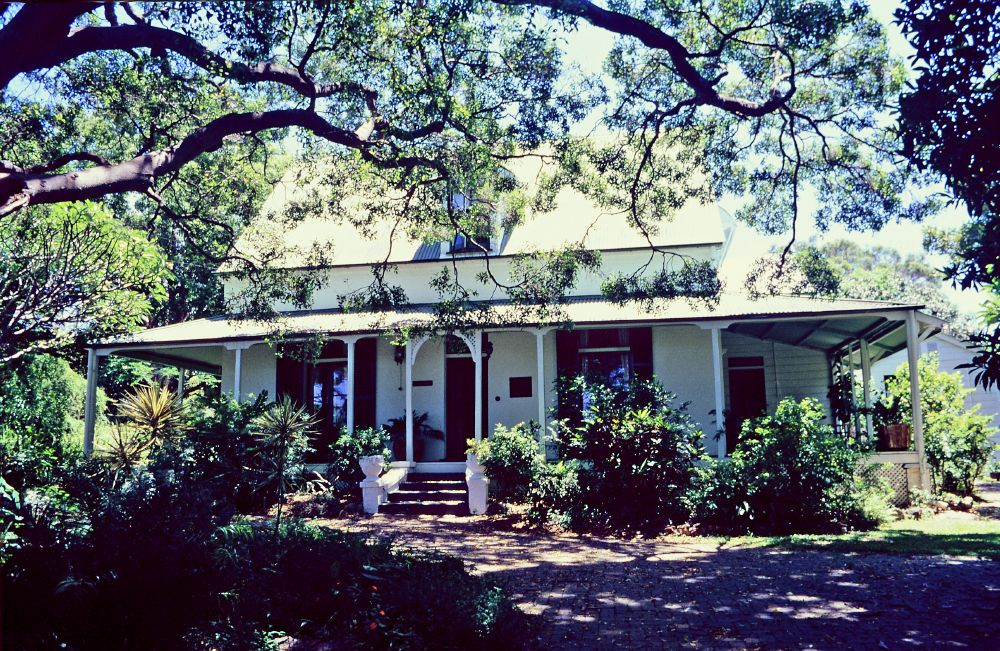
- Lucerne, 1997

- Location within Queensland
- 27.4653°S 153.001°E
- Location: 23 Fernberg Road, Paddington, City of Brisbane, Queensland, Australia

History
- Design period: 1840s–1860s (mid-19th century)
- Built: c. 1860–1862

Queensland Heritage Register
- Official name: Lucerne
- Type: state heritage (built, landscape)
- Designated: 21 October 1992
- Reference no.: 600251
- Significant period: 1860s (fabric); 1860s–1890s (historical)
- Significant components: residential accommodation – main house, tennis court, driveway, kitchen/kitchen house, attic, garden/grounds

Lucerne on Fernberg is a heritage-listed detached house at 23 Fernberg Road, Paddington, City of Brisbane, Queensland, Australia. It was built from 1859 to 1862 and is believed to be the oldest privately owned residence in Brisbane. It was added to the Queensland Heritage Register on 21 October 1992.

== History ==
James Young, a bricklayer by trade who reputedly worked as a foreman for John Petrie, acquired 6 acres (2.4 ha) 2 roods (22,000 sq ft; 2,000 m^{2}) of land at Milton, adjoining what later became Bishopsbourne, by deed of grant dated 22 August 1859. The house is believed to have been built by 1862, the first of three homes which Young constructed on the property, to accommodate a family of sixteen children.

By the early 1870s, Young was renting the house to John Guthrie, a solicitor credited with naming the property "Lucerne", after the lake and town in Switzerland. A clue as to why Guthrie saw similarities is in the nature of the terrain; a steep sided watercourse would have bisected the property. To provide it with fresh water it may have been dammed, hence a lake or pond would have formed. On the western or opposite side of the property was Red Jacket Swamp, now the sports ground and park for Milton State School.

In the late 1870s the Misses Davis possibly ran a school from the premises. By 1877 the house comprised drawing, dining and sitting rooms on the ground floor, an attic space divided into four bedrooms, a bathroom and detached kitchen-house with servant's quarters, along with various outbuildings. Alexander Duncan Campbell purchased the residence on 2 acres (0.81 ha) 3 roods (33,000 sq ft; 3,000 m^{2}) 33.8 perches (850 m^{2}) early in 1879, and by mid-1883 Lucerne was in the possession of Agnes wife of John Scott MLA (1883–98). Scott, a pastoralist and parliamentarian, resided there until his death in 1898. The property remained in the hands of his heirs until purchased by Miss Annie Hirst in 1905. Members of the Hirst family lived at Lucerne for many years, until the former's death in 1940. Since 1947 the property has had three owners, the Wards, the Morrows and the O'Sullivans, the latter having resided at Lucerne since 1969. In that year a new kitchen and eating area were created along the enclosed rear verandah, and the old detached kitchen converted to a bedroom. A series of detached additions at the rear of the house have been erected since.

Today, "Lucerne" comprises four buildings, used to provide bed and breakfast accommodation, within half an acre of land dominated by a large Port Jackson fig tree. The gabled brick main building with its high-pitched roof and dormer window is a rare survivor in contemporary Brisbane.

== Description ==
Modest in concept, Lucerne is a single-storey, rectangular brick house with attic rooms. The dwelling consists of a central hallway with study and dining room to the right; a long sitting room to the left; modern kitchen and bathroom facilities at the rear; and an internal cedar staircase leading from a large room, projecting at the rear centre, to attic bedrooms and bathroom. A former detached kitchen house with fireplace is located at the rear to the east. French doors, with casement fanlights above, lead from the two front rooms onto the verandahs. Internal joinery is of cedar, which has been painted, and the walls are plastered. The whole is surmounted by a gabled roof with a ridge running transverse to the axis of the house. Roof shingling has been replaced with galvanised iron. An attic dormer window overlooks a simple timber posted front verandah, from which the original cross-braced balustrading has been removed. Casement windows with bull-nosed hoods have been added to each gable, which retain their scalloped bargeboards. Sympathetic detached additions have been made to the rear of the cottage since 1969.

== Heritage listing ==
Lucerne was listed on the Queensland Heritage Register on 21 October 1992 having satisfied the following criteria.

The place is important in demonstrating the evolution or pattern of Queensland's history.

Lucerne was built early in the Separation era, when Queenslanders were conscious of the need to substantiate their existence in the local environment. Brick cottages, often the homes of the lower middle-class, were relatively common at this time.

The place demonstrates rare, uncommon or endangered aspects of Queensland's cultural heritage.

The gabled brick building with its high-pitched roof and dormer window is a rare survivor in contemporary Brisbane.

Lucerne remains as a fine example of 1860s brick house construction, especially since it was erected by the artisan-owner as a family residence.

The place is important because of its aesthetic significance.

Lucerne is an attractive house of unpretentious yet balanced proportions. The simplicity of form reflects both its function as a first home and the skill of its builder. Details such as the scalloped bargeboards, interior cedar staircase and joinery, and casement fanlights, are obvious aesthetic features.

The place has a special association with the life or work of a particular person, group or organisation of importance in Queensland's history.

In a history spanning approximately one hundred and thirty years, Lucerne, which began as a craftsman's dwelling, became home to a number of notable Queensland families. As early as 1877, the house was advertised as a 'gentleman's residence', and such it has remained.
