= Oscar de Satgé =

Australian politician

Oscar de Satge
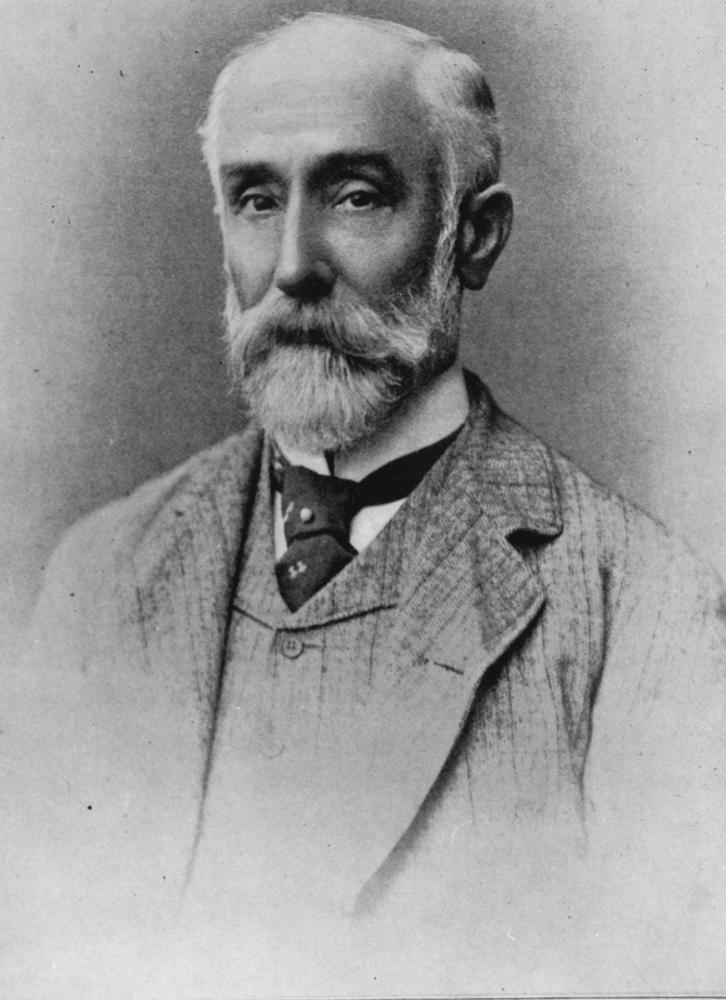

Member of the Queensland Legislative Assembly for Clermont
- In office 4 March 1869 – 4 April 1870
- Preceded by: Robert Travers Atkin
- Succeeded by: John Robinson Benson

Member of the Queensland Legislative Assembly for Clermont
- In office 6 September 1870 – 9 April 1872
- Preceded by: John Robinson Benson
- Succeeded by: Charles James Graham

Member of the Queensland Legislative Assembly for Normanby
- In office 4 November 1873 – 20 March 1877
- Succeeded by: George Fox

Member of the Queensland Legislative Assembly for Mitchell
- In office 3 February 1881 – 5 April 1882
- Preceded by: Boyd Dunlop Morehead
- Succeeded by: John Govett

Personal details
- Born: 20 November 1836 Lausanne, Switzerland
- Died: 26 September 1906 (aged 69) Folkestone, England
- Spouse: Beatrice Elizabeth Fletcher
- Occupation: Squatter, Public servant, Sheep and cattle grazier

Oscar John de Satgé (1836–1906) was an Australian squatter and politician. He was a Member of the Queensland Legislative Assembly.

== Early life ==
Oscar John de Satgé was born on 20 November 1836 in Lausanne, Switzerland, the son of Ernest Valentine, first vicomte de Satgé de St Jean, and his wife Caroline (née Sparkes). He attended school at Rugby School from 1849 to 1952. In May 1853, he immigrated to Melbourne, Australia, on the Essex.

== Politics ==
On 29 January 1869, Robert Travers Atkin, member for Clermont, resigned. On 4 March 1869, Oscar de Satge was elected to the Queensland Legislative Assembly at the resulting by-election, defeating Charles Hardie Buzacott, the proprietor of the local newspaper, the Peak Downs Telegram. He held that seat only until he resigned on 4 April 1870. John Robinson Benson won the resulting by-election on 4 May 1870. However, only a few months later, at the next state election on 6 September 1870, Oscar de Satge was re-elected in the seat on 6 September 1870, which he held until he resigned again on 9 April 1872. Charles Graham won the resulting by-election on 30 April 1872.

On 4 November 1873, he was elected again, this time in the electoral district of Normanby. He held this seat until he resigned on 20 March 1877. George Fox won the resulting by-election on 19 April 1877.

On 30 December 1880, Boyd Dunlop Morehead, the member for Mitchell, was appointed to the Queensland Legislative Council. Oscar de Satge won the resulting by-election on 3 February 1881. He held this seat until he resigned on 5 April 1882. John Govett won the resulting by-election on 27 April 1882.

== Later life ==
A noted pastoralist, he acquired the Augustus Downs Station in around 1881 along with Carandotta Station after selling Coreena Station for £70,000.

In 1882, de Satge retired to England. On 3 August 1882, he married Beatrice Elizabeth Fletcher at Madehurst, Sussex, with whom he had one son and two daughters. In 1883, 1888 and 1893, he visited Australia to inspect his properties.

In 1901, he published a book of his experiences under the title Pages from the journal of a Queensland squatter; he dedicated his book to Robert Herbert, the first Queensland Premier. The book has been digitised and made available for public download by the Open Library.

He died on 26 September 1906 at his residence, Elysee, Shorncliffe Road, Folkestone. His estate was valued at £443.

== Publications ==
- Oscar De Satge (1901), Pages from the journal of a Queensland squatter, London Hurst and Blackett, Limited

== See also ==
- Members of the Queensland Legislative Assembly, 1868–1870; 1870–1871; 1871–1873; 1873–1878; 1878–1883

Parliament of Queensland
Preceded by Arthur Francis	Member for Clermont; 1869 – 1870	Succeeded by John Robinson Benson
Preceded by John Robinson Benson	Member for Clermont; 1870 – 1872	Succeeded by Charles James Graham
New seat	Member for Normanby; 1873 – 1877	Succeeded by George Fox
Preceded by Boyd Dunlop Morehead	Member for Mitchell; 1881 – 1882	Succeeded by John Govett
