= Charles Graham (Queensland politician) =

Australian politician

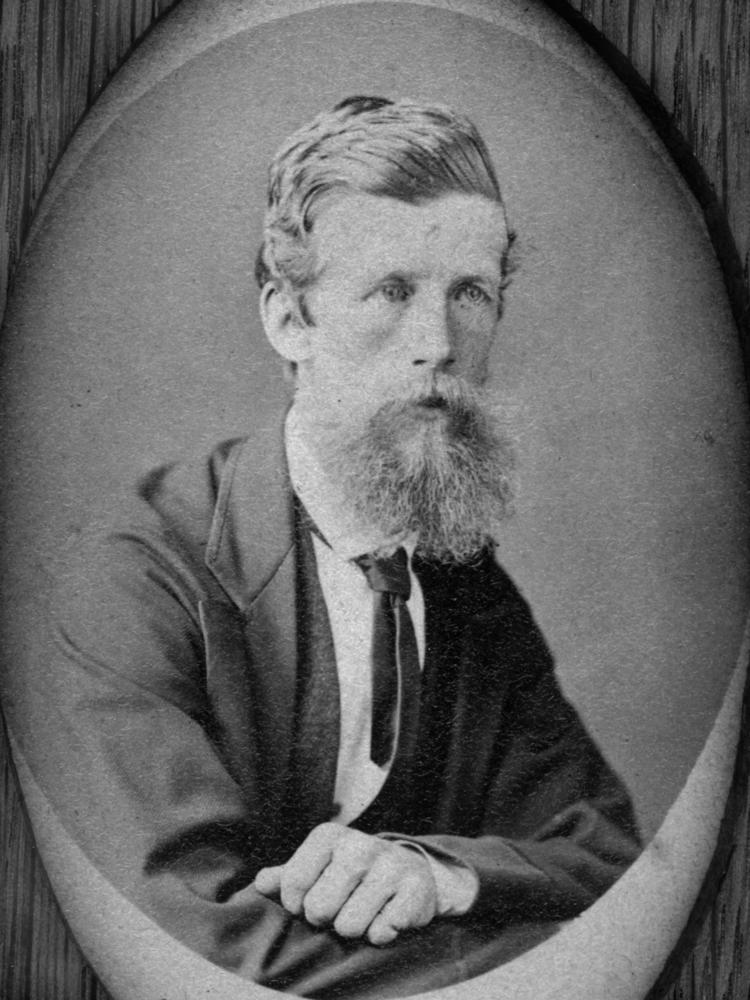
- Honourable Charles Graham, 1873

Member of the Queensland Legislative Assembly for Clermont
- In office 11 May 1872 – 4 January 1876
- Preceded by: Oscar De Satge
- Succeeded by: John Stevenson

Personal details
- Born: Charles James Graham; 7 October 1839 Hinxton, Cambridgeshire, England
- Died: 18 March 1886 (aged 46) Albany, Western Australia, Australia
- Spouse: Mary Joseph Enright (m.1871)
- Occupation: Squatter, Editor, Brewery owner

Charles James Graham (1839-1886) was a politician in Queensland, Australia. He was a Member of the Queensland Legislative Assembly. Graham represented the electorate of Clermont from 11 May 1872 to 4 January 1876.

== Early life ==
Charles James Graham was born on 7 October 1839 in Hinxton, Cambridgeshire, England. He was educated at Uppingham and Peterhouse, graduating with a BA in 1862 before moving to Australia where he was a squatter.

== Family ==
He married Mary Joseph Enright on 21 September 1871, and they had three children.

== Politics ==
Graham was the Secretary for Public Lands from 15 July 1873 to 8 January 1874.

== Later life ==
After resigning from Parliament he was appointed Under Secretary for Public Instruction.

Director-General of Education 1876–1878

Later he became the editor (and later sole owner) of the Peak Downs Telegram.

He later moved to Orange, New South Wales where he operated a brewery.

Graham died on 18 March 1886 in Albany, Western Australia, Australia.

Parliament of Queensland
Preceded by Oscar De Satge	Member for Clermont; 1872–1876	Succeeded by John Stevenson
