= John Michael Cross =

Australian politician

John Cross
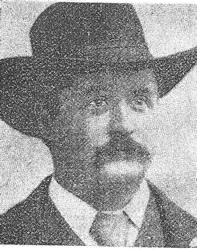

Member of the Queensland Legislative Assembly for Clermont
- In office 6 May 1893 – 11 Mar 1899
- Preceded by: John Stevenson
- Succeeded by: Vincent Lesina

Personal details
- Born: John Michael Cross; 1 February 1859 Newcastle upon Tyne, England
- Died: 12 April 1934 (aged 75) Brisbane, Queensland, Australia
- Resting place: South Brisbane Cemetery
- Party: Labour
- Spouse: Margaret Bell (m.1884 d.1905)
- Occupation: Journalist

John Michael Cross (1 February 1859 – 12 April 1934) was a journalist and member of the Queensland Legislative Assembly.

== Biography ==
Cross was born in Newcastle upon Tyne, England to parents Thomas Cross and his wife Elizabeth (née Burnett) and was educated in England. After his arrival in Australia he took up journalism and worked at several newspapers including the Brisbane Telegraph, the Northern Argus in Rockhampton, the Toowoomba Chronicle, the Maryborough Chronicle, and the Gympie Miner. He was also the editor of the Peoples' Newspaper in Rockhampton.

After his time in parliament he continued as a journalist and Hansard reporter in Brisbane. He was a councillor of the Royal Society of St George and a member of the Esoteric Lodge of Masonry.

On the 23 Aug 1884 he married Margaret Bell (died 1905) in Brisbane and together had two sons. He died in Brisbane in 1934 and was buried in the South Brisbane Cemetery.

== Political career ==
At the 1893 Queensland colonial elections, Cross, representing the Labour Party, defeated the sitting member, John Stevenson, for the seat of Clermont. He remained the member for six years, but was defeated by the endorsed Labour candidate, Vincent Lesina, at the 1899 election, after standing as an "unpledged" Labour candidate.

Parliament of Queensland
Preceded by John Stevenson	Member for Clermont; 1893–1899	Succeeded by Vincent Lesina
