= William Fowles =

Australian politician

Member of the Queensland Legislative Assembly for Clermont
- In office 22 November 1878 – 1 March 1879
- Preceded by: John Stevenson
- Succeeded by: Henry Weld-Blundell

Personal details
- Born: William Lambert Fowles; 1842 Kent, England
- Died: 18 August 1880 (aged 38) Brisbane, Queensland, Australia
- Resting place: Toowong Cemetery
- Spouse: Eliza Bushby (m.1868 d.1919)
- Occupation: Registrar of the Supreme Court

William Lambert Fowles (1842 – 18 August 1880) was a politician in Queensland, Australia, successfully winning the seat of Clermont in 1878. He was a Member of the Queensland Legislative Assembly.

== Early life ==
Fowles was born in 1842 in Kent, England, and emigrated with his family in 1849. He became an articled clerk with Charles Lilley (and later James Garrick) and was admitted as a solicitor in 1865.

== Career ==
From 1865 to 1869 he practised in partnership with Thomas Keane. In 1869, he became the Registrar of the Supreme Court of Queensland, but resigned this position upon the death of Thomas Keane to take over the law practice. Fowles would practise as a solicitor in Clermont, Queensland from 1873. He also took a part interest in the Peak Downs Telegram and was editor of it. After standing as a Liberal candidate and winning the seat of Clermont in 1878, changes occurred within the party and before he could take his seat in the chamber, he again took the position of the Registrar of the Supreme Court of Queensland in 1879. He would hold this position until his death in 1880.

== Later life ==
Fowles died at his home and was survived by his wife and five children. His funeral proceeded from his former residence at South Brisbane to the Toowong Cemetery.

Parliament of Queensland
Preceded by John Stevenson	Member for Clermont; 1878–1879	Succeeded by Henry Weld-Blundell
