= Albrecht Feez =

Australian politician

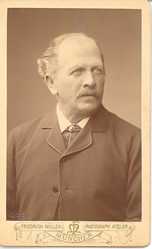

Member of the Queensland Legislative Assembly for Leichhardt
- In office 6 May 1880 – 23 August 1883 Serving with John Scott
- Preceded by: John MacFarlane
- Succeeded by: Charles Dutton

Personal details
- Born: Albrecht Feez; October 1825 Eschau, Bavaria, Germany
- Died: 25 July 1905 (aged 79) Munich, Germany
- Spouse: Sophia Milford (m.1857)
- Occupation: Pastoralist

Albrecht Feez (1825 – 25 July 1905) was a politician in Queensland, Australia. He was a Member of the Queensland Legislative Assembly. He died on 25 July 1905 in Munich Germany.

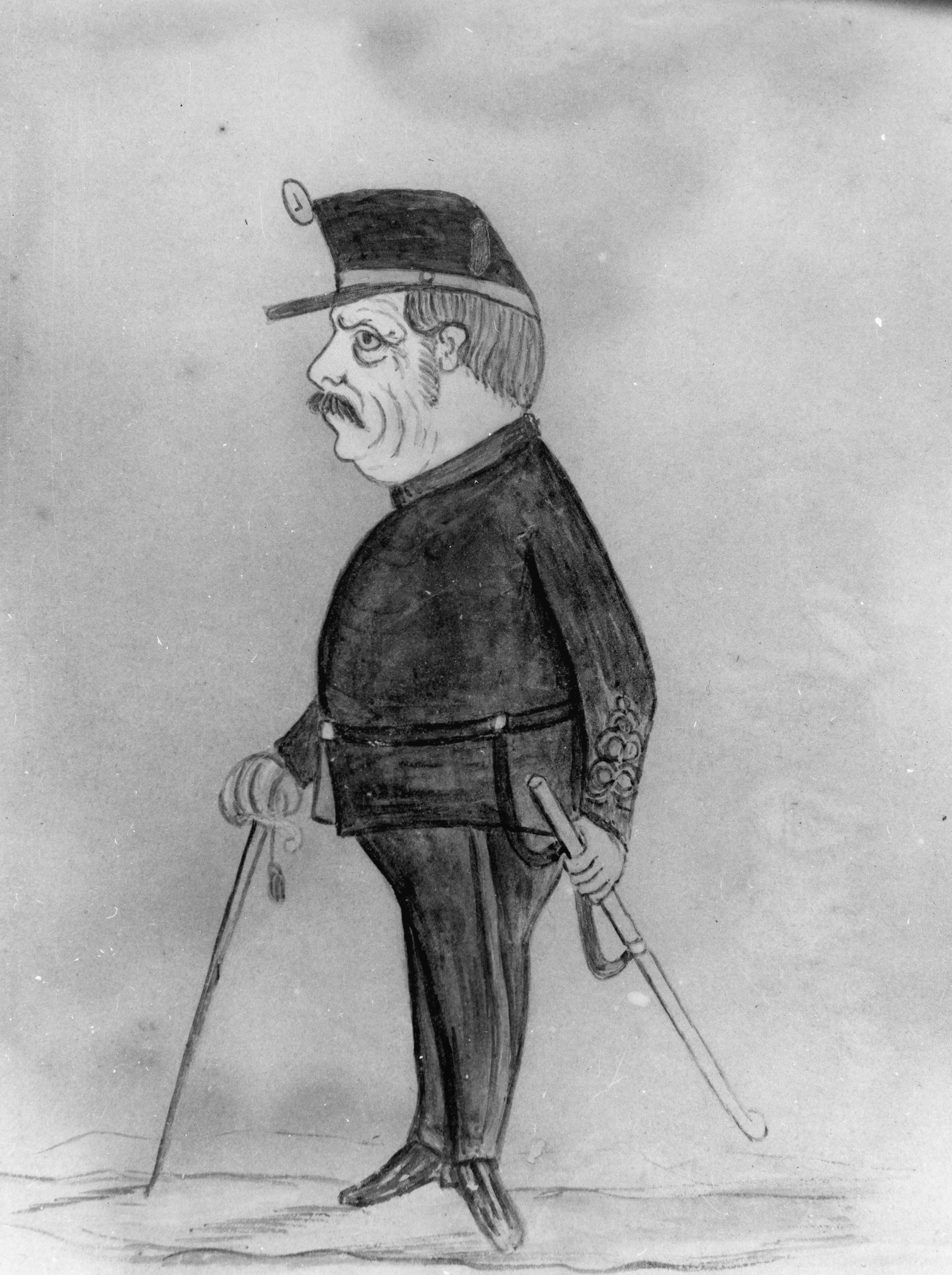
Lieutenant Colonel Albrecht Feez

== Family life ==
He married Sophia Milford on 13 October 1857 in Brisbane and they had two sons.

== Career ==
Feez served in the Army in Germany and gained pastoral experience. He was a storekeeper in 1858 and a Carrier in Rockhampton. He was also a merchant, a Rockhampton Alderman and mayor in 1879.

Parliament of Queensland
Preceded by John MacFarlane	Member for Leichhardt; 1880–1883	Succeeded by Charles Dutton
