= John Robinson Benson =

Australian politician

Dr John Benson

Member of the Queensland Legislative Assembly for Clermont
- In office 4 May 1870 – 6 September 1870
- Preceded by: Oscar de Satge
- Succeeded by: Oscar de Satge

Personal details
- Born: John Robinson Benson; 1836 Armagh, Ireland
- Died: 25 July 1885 (aged 48-49) St Kilda, Victoria, Australia
- Spouse: Bertha D'Arcy (m.1866)
- Relations: William Knox D'Arcy (brother-in-law)
- Education: Queen's University
- Occupation: Physician

John Robinson Benson (1836–1885) was a politician in Queensland, Australia. He was a Member of the Queensland Legislative Assembly.

== Early life ==
Benson was born 1836 in Armagh, Ireland. After attending Queen's University, Ontario Benson migrated to Queensland and established a medical practice in 1867.

== Politics ==
Benson represented the electoral district of Clermont from 4 May 1870 to 6 September 1870. Benson was critical of the existing Legislative Assembly, advocated for separation of North Queensland from the rest of the state, and reform of the Land Act, Immigration Act and Pastoral Leases Act.

== Later life ==
Benson died in St Kilda, Melbourne on 25 July 1885.

Parliament of Queensland
Preceded by Oscar de Satge	Member for Clermont; 1870	Succeeded by Oscar de Satge
