= Mitchell Fowles =

English cricketer (born 1970)

Personal information
- Full name: Mitchell Graham Fowles
- Born: 18 December 1970 (age 55); Worcester, Worcestershire, England
- Batting: Right-handed
- Bowling: Right-arm medium

Domestic team information
- Years: Team
- 1992–1997: Herefordshire

Career statistics
Competition	LA
Matches	2
Runs scored	2
Batting average	2.00
100s/50s	–/–
Top score	2*
Balls bowled	132
Wickets	3
Bowling average	48.66
5 wickets in innings	–
10 wickets in match	–
Best bowling	2/73
Catches/stumpings	1/–
- Source: Cricinfo, 26 November 2010

Mitchell Graham Fowles (born 18 December 1970) is a former English cricketer. Fowles was a right-handed batsman who bowled right-arm medium pace. He was born at Worcester, Worcestershire

Fowles made his debut for Herefordshire in the 1992 Minor Counties Championship against Wales Minor Counties. From 1992 to 1997, he represented the county in 30 Championship matches, the last of which came against Wiltshire. His MCCA Knockout Trophy debut for the county came against Staffordshire in 1992. From 1992 to 1997, he represented the county in 12 Trophy matches, the last of which came against Shropshire.

He also represented Herefordshire in 2 List A matches against Durham in the 1995 NatWest Trophy and Somerset in the 1997 NatWest Trophy. In his 2 matches, he took 3 wickets at a bowling average of 48.66, with best figures of 2/73.
