= Henry Joseph Weld-Blundell =

Australian politician

Henry Joseph Weld-Blundell (25 July 1848 – 8 September 1901) was a politician in Queensland, Australia. He was a Member of the Queensland Legislative Assembly, representing Clermont from 1879 to 1883.

== Personal life ==
He was born at Ince Blundell, the second son of Thomas Weld Blundell. He died of typhoid fever at Buckingham Gate, London, leaving a widow and infant daughter.
