= Tom Foley (Australian politician) =

Australian politician

15th Deputy Premier of Queensland
- In office 17 January 1952 – 16 March 1953
- Premier: Vince Gair
- Preceded by: Vince Gair
- Succeeded by: Jack Duggan

Member of the Queensland Legislative Assembly for Leichhardt
- In office 20 December 1919 – 10 June 1932
- Preceded by: Herbert Hardacre
- Succeeded by: Seat abolished

Member of the Queensland Legislative Assembly for Normanby
- In office 11 June 1932 – 28 April 1950
- Preceded by: Jens Peterson
- Succeeded by: Seat abolished

Member of the Queensland Legislative Assembly for Belyando
- In office 29 April 1950 – 28 May 1960
- Preceded by: New seat
- Succeeded by: Seat abolished

Personal details
- Born: Thomas Andrew Foley; 26 April 1886 Charters Towers, Queensland, Australia
- Died: 5 February 1973 (aged 86) South Brisbane, Queensland, Australia
- Resting place: Nudgee Cemetery
- Party: Queensland Labor Party
- Other political affiliations: Labor
- Spouse: Christina Madeline Pianta (b.1895 m.1920 d.1956)
- Occupation: Australian Workers' Union organiser, Timber contractor

Thomas Andrew Foley (26 April 1886 – 5 February 1973) was a Member of the Queensland Legislative Assembly.

== Early life ==
Foley was born in Charters Towers to Andrew Foley and his wife Margaret (née McKeegan). He was educated at Charters Towers State School and later studied at night school. After he left school Foley held various jobs before becoming a contractor, supplying timber sleepers to the railways. By 1919 he had become an organiser for the Australian Workers' Union.

== Politics ==
Foley entered state politics in 1919. During the next 41 years he held the seats of Leichhardt from 1919 till 1932, Normanby from 1932 till 1950, and Belyando from 1950 till 1960. He stood for the seat of Barcoo at the 1960 election but was defeated.

During his time in parliament he held the roles of Secretary for Mines, Health and Home Affairs, Public Lands and Irrigation, and Labour and Industry. Foley also held the role as Government Whip from 1932 till 1936.

His time in politics was highlighted by several controversies. In 1946, Foley was charged after illicit tobacco was found in his garage. The magistrate dismissed the charge however two other men, one of them being Foley's brother-in-law, were found guilty of possession of the contraband. After this affair Foley was given the nickname "Fine Cut" Foley. In that same year, he was involved in a fist fight with Frank Barnes in the member's dining room. Foley apologised to parliament for his actions but Barnes refused to do so and was suspended from the house.

As Secretary for Public Lands, he introduced legislation for closer-land and war-service settlement. In 1956, both allegations of maladministration and claims of corruption regarding graziers being forced to pay bribes to secure lease renewals were made in both state and federal parliament, and the state government instituted the Royal Commission on Land Leases to investigate the issues. After initial hearings resulted in an interim report critical of Foley, the commission was suspended, Foley stepped aside as Minister for Lands, and criminal charges were instigated against Foley, which resulted in an acquittal and Foley's reinstatement. However, the Royal Commission was then reopened and handed down a verdict that Foley was guilty of corrupt conduct for soliciting bribes, resulting in his final resignation as minister. After his resignation from the ministry his wife was found unconscious on the bedroom floor of their home and died the next day. It was suggested that she had heard of his resignation on the radio and the shock of this news caused her to suffer a stroke. Foley was subsequently expelled from the Labor Party in October 1956.

After the 1957 Labor split, Foley was accepted into the newly formed Queensland Labor Party. He managed to hold his seat at that year's state elections but the electorate was abolished before the 1960 election and, standing for Barcoo, was defeated.

== Personal life ==
Foley married Christina Madeline Pianta at St Joseph's Catholic Church, Capella in 1920 and they had three children. After politics he retired to Coochiemudlo Island where he became a pawpaw farmer.

He died at South Brisbane in 1973 and was buried in Nudgee Cemetery.

Parliament of Queensland
Preceded by Herbert Hardacre	Member for Leichhardt; 1919–1932	Abolished
Preceded by Jens Peterson	Member for Normanby; 1932–1950	Abolished
New seat	Member for Belyando; 1950–1960	Abolished
