= Donald Smith Wallace =

Australian politician, pastoralist, and racehorse owner

Donald Smith Wallace (10 August 1844 – 27 May 1900) was a politician in Queensland, Australia. He was a Member of the Queensland Legislative Assembly.

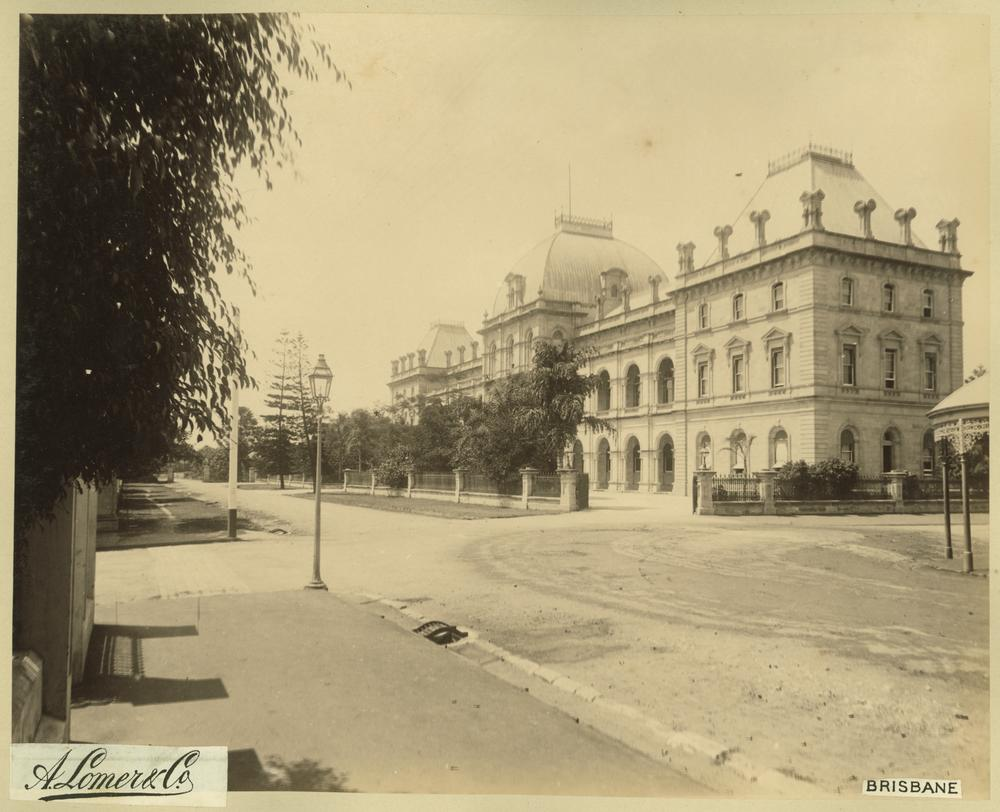

He represented the Queensland electorate of Clermont from 7 September 1883 to 5 May 1888. He subsequently served in the Victorian Legislative Council for South Western Province from 1889 to 1894.

He was a pastoralist and racehorse owner.

== Notable achievements ==
He was the winner of the Melbourne Cup twice: in 1888 with his horse Mentor and in 1890 with his most famous horse Carbine.
