= Charles Fitzsimmons (politician) =

Australian politician

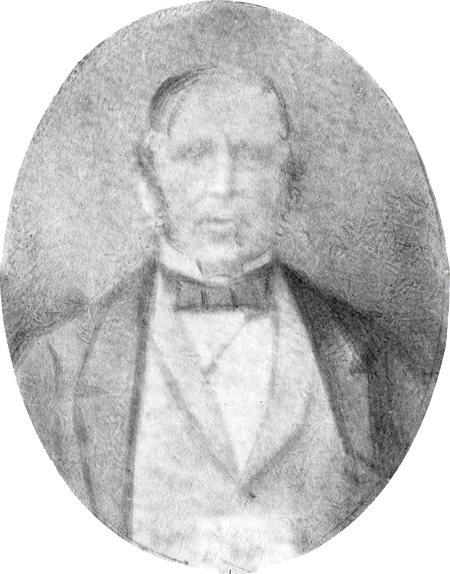

Member of the Queensland Legislative Assembly for Port Curtis
- In office 4 May 1860 – 3 September 1861
- Succeeded by: Alfred Sandeman

Member of the Queensland Legislative Assembly for Rockhampton
- In office 1 February 1865 – 27 June 1867
- Succeeded by: Thomas Henry FitzGerald

Member of the Queensland Legislative Assembly for Clermont
- In office 1 July 1867 – 11 May 1868
- Preceded by: George Edward Forbes
- Succeeded by: John Scott

Personal details
- Born: 1802 County Cavan, Ireland
- Died: 24 February 1876 (aged 73–74) Mackay, Queensland
- Occupation: Sugar planter

Charles Fitzsimmons (1802—1876) was an Irish-born politician and sugar farmer in Queensland, Australia. He was a Member of the Queensland Legislative Assembly.

== Early life ==
Charles Fitzsimmons was born in 1802 in County Cavan, Ireland, the son of James Fitzsimmons and his wife Margaret (née Lynch).

== Politics ==
Fitzsimmons was elected as Member for Port Curtis in the Queensland Legislative Assembly at the inaugural colonial election on 4 May 1860. He held that seat until he resigned on 3 September 1861; Alfred Sandeman won the resulting by-election on 15 October 1861.

Under the Additional Members Act 1864, the seats of Clermont, Kennedy, Maryborough, Mitchell, Rockhampton and Warrego were created. By-elections were held to fill the new seats on 18 March 1865. Fitzsimmons was elected in Rockhampton. He held the seat until the 1867 election on 27 June at which he did not contest the seat, saying he desired to retire from public life. However, he did contest the seat of electoral district of Clermont in the same election, and it was speculated that he had been pressured to stand aside in Rockhampton to allow Archibald Archer to be elected there. However, Thomas Henry Fitzgerald won the election in Rockhampton, but resigned immediately as he wanted to contest the electoral district of Kennedy instead. Archer won the resulting by-election in Rockhampton on 27 July 1867 unopposed.

Fitzsimmons won the election in Clermont on 1 July 1867 and represented that seat until he resigned on 11 May 1868.

== Later life ==
Fitzsimmons died on 24 February 1876 at Nebia Plantation, Mackay, Queensland, following several weeks of prostration due to old age.

== See also ==
- Members of the Queensland Legislative Assembly, 1860–1863
- Members of the Queensland Legislative Assembly, 1863–1867
- Members of the Queensland Legislative Assembly, 1867–1868

Parliament of Queensland
New seat	Member for Port Curtis; 1860–1861	Succeeded by Alfred Sandeman
New seat	Member for Rockhampton; 1865–1867	Succeeded by Thomas Henry FitzGerald
Preceded by George Edward Forbes	Member for Clermont; 1867–1868	Succeeded by John Scott
