= Roderick Travers =

Australian politician

Member of the Queensland Legislative Assembly for Clermont
- In office 11 Sep 1866 – 12 Oct 1866
- Preceded by: Sydney Davis
- Succeeded by: George Forbes

Personal details
- Born: Roderick Travers; 9 May 1831 Islington, London, England
- Died: 19 July 1894 (aged 63) Kensington, London, England
- Spouse(s): Charlotte Owen (m.1863 d.1867), Amy Stephen (m.1872)
- Occupation: Sheep farmer

Roderick Travers (9 May 1831 – 19 July 1894) was a sheep farmer and member of the Queensland Legislative Assembly.

== Early days ==
Travers was born in Islington, London, and sailed on the Blackwall from Portsmouth to Australia in 1850. He returned to London in 1852 and did not return to Australia until 1862. He acquired and ran several different stations in New South Wales and Queensland until his return to London around 1889. He helped found the Central Queensland Meat Export Co. Ltd in Rockhampton in 1880.

== Political career ==
After the resignation of Sydney Davis as the state member for Clermont in 1866, Travers was elected to take his place. He declined to take his seat in parliament believing that he did not have sufficient time at his disposal to permit his accepting the appointment and resigned a month later.

== Personal life ==
On the 29 August 1863, Travers married Charlotte Owen at Tamworth and together had one son and one daughter. Charlotte died at sea on her way south from Rockhampton in 1867.

He married again on the 17 August 1872 in Caulfield, Victoria to Amy Stephen and together had three sons and two daughters.

Travers died in Kensington, London, on the 19 July 1894.

Parliament of Queensland
| Preceded by Sydney Davis | Member for Clermont; 1866 | Succeeded by George Forbes |
