= Electoral district of Clermont =

Coordinates: 22°49′0″S 147°38′0″E

Clermont Queensland—Legislative Assembly
- State: Queensland
- Created: 1864
- Abolished: 1910
- Namesake: Clermont, Queensland

Clermont was a Legislative Assembly electorate in the state of Queensland. The electorate was based on the town of Clermont and surrounding areas.

== History ==
In 1864, the Additional Members Act created six additional electoral districts, each returning 1 member:

- Clermont
- Kennedy
- Maryborough
- Mitchell
- Rockhampton
- Warrego

The first elections in these six electorates were held in 1865 (that is, during a parliamentary term and not as part of a general election across Queensland). The nomination date for the election in Clermont was 18 February 1865 and the election was held on 18 March 1865.

The electoral district of Clermont was abolished in 1910 when the area was incorporated into the Electoral district of Leichhardt.

== Members ==
The following people represented this electorate:

Member	Party	Term
Sydney Beavan Davis		18 March 1865 – 18 August 1866
Roderick Travers		11 September 1866 (by-election) – 12 October 1866
George Edward Forbes		13 November 1866 (by-election) – 20 June 1867
Charles Fitzsimmons		1 July 1867 – 11 May 1868
John Scott		22 June 1868 (by-election) – 1 October 1868
Robert Travers Atkin		1 October 1868 – 29 January 1869
Oscar John De Satge		4 March 1869 (by-election) – 4 April 1870
John Robinson Benson		4 May 1870 (by-election) – 6 September 1870
Oscar John De Satge		6 September 1870 – 9 April 1872
Charles James Graham		30 April 1872 (by-election) – 4 January 1876
John Stevenson		4 February 1876 (by-election) – 22 November 1878
William Lambert Fowles		22 November 1878 – 1 March 1879
Henry Joseph Weld-Blundell		5 April 1879 (by-election) – 7 September 1883
Donald Smith Wallace		7 September 1883 – 5 May 1888
John Stevenson		5 May 1888 – 6 May 1893
John Michael Cross	ALP	6 May 1893 – 11 March 1899
Joe Lesina	ALP	11 March 1899 – 27 April 1912

== See also ==
- Electoral districts of Queensland
- Members of the Queensland Legislative Assembly by year
- Category:Members of the Queensland Legislative Assembly by name
