= Charles Dutton (politician) =

Australian politician

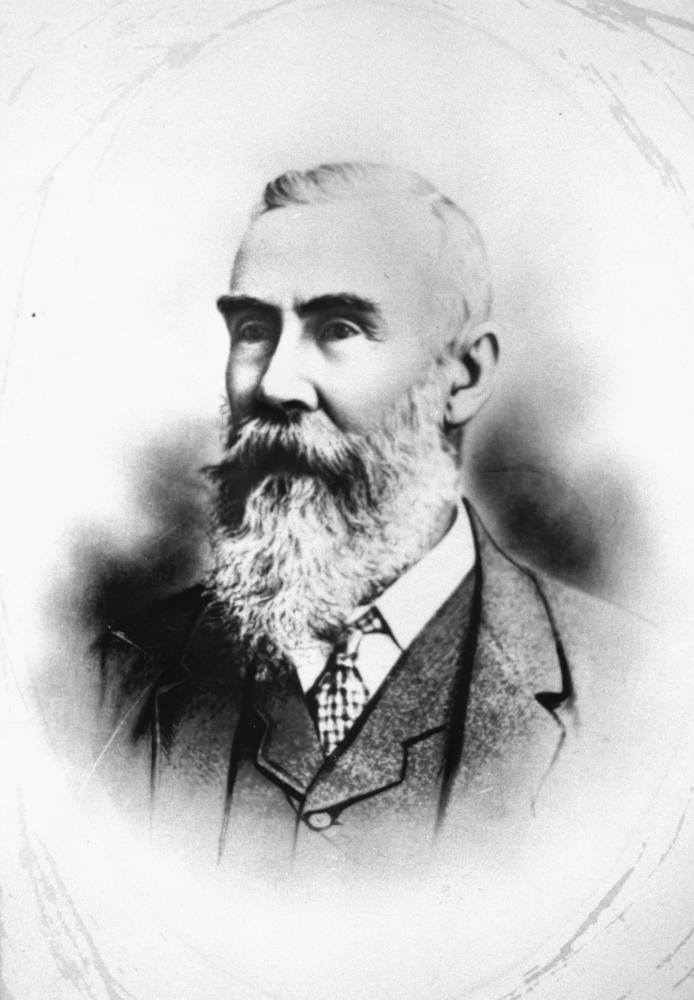

Member of the Queensland Legislative Assembly for Leichhardt
- In office 23 August 1883 – 5 May 1888 Serving with John Scott
- Preceded by: Albrecht Feez
- Succeeded by: Seat abolished

Personal details
- Born: Charles Boydell Dutton; 16 August 1834 Singleton, New South Wales, Australia
- Died: 5 February 1904 (aged 69) Tenterfield, New South Wales, Australia
- Resting place: private
- Spouse: Martha Ann Alice Coley
- Occupation: Squatter, Grazier

Charles Boydell Dutton (16 August 1834 – 5 February 1904) was an Australian pastoralist and politician in colonial Queensland.

== Early life ==
Dutton was born in Singleton, New South Wales, the son of Henry Pelerin Dutton (c. 1803 – 30 January 1870), a Hunter River squatter, and his wife Sophia Hume Dutton, née Bell (c. 1804 – 18 August 1889).

== Politics ==
Dutton was a member of the Queensland Legislative Assembly for Leichhardt from 23 August 1883 to 5 May 1888 and Secretary for Lands from 13 November 1883 to 30 August 1887; Secretary for Works and Mines from the latter date till 12 December 1887; and from that date till 13 June 1888 Secretary for Railways in the First Griffith Ministry. At the general election in 1888, Dutton was an unsuccessful candidate for the Leichhardt district. Dutton, who embraced Henry George's land nationalisation theories, and endeavoured as Secretary for Lands to give some approximate effect to them in legislation, then became a squatter in New South Wales.

== Later life ==
Dutton died on 5 February 1904 in Tenterfield, New South Wales.

== Legacy ==
The suburb of Dutton Park in Brisbane is named after him. Former Australian federal opposition leader, Peter Dutton, is Charles Dutton's great-great-grandson.

Parliament of Queensland
Preceded by Albrecht Feez	Member for Leichhardt; 1883 - 1888; Served alongside: John Scott	Abolished
