= Electoral district of Normanby (Queensland) =

Normanby Queensland—Legislative Assembly
- State: Queensland
- Created: 1872
- Abolished: 1949
- Demographic: Rural

The electoral district of Normanby was a Legislative Assembly electorate in the state of Queensland from 1872 until 1949.

== History ==
Normanby was created by the Electoral Districts Act in 1872 as a single-member seat, stretching from the coastal area around St Lawrence, west towards Clermont. Over the years of redistributions, Normanby became an inland electorate to the west of Rockhampton. Normanby was abolished in the 1949 redistribution which split it across the Electoral district of Mackenzie, the Electoral district of Keppel, and the Electoral district of Callide.

== Members ==
The following people represented Normanby:

Member	Party	Term
Oscar de Satge		1873—1877
George Fox	Ministerialist, Opposition	1877—1878
John Stevenson		1878—1888
John Murray		1888—1901
George Fox	Ministerialist	1901—1914
Edward Archer	Liberal	1914—1915
Jens Peterson	ALP, Country, United, CPNP	1915—1932
Tom Foley	ALP	1932—1950

== See also ==
- Electoral districts of Queensland
- Members of the Queensland Legislative Assembly by year
- Category:Members of the Queensland Legislative Assembly by name
