= John Edwards (Australian politician) =

Australian politician

Member of the Queensland Legislative Assembly for Burnett
- In office 24 June 1863 – 15 April 1865 Serving with Robert Mackenzie
- Preceded by: Robert Mackenzie
- Succeeded by: Charles Haly

Personal details
- Born: John Edwards; 1820 England
- Died: 25 November 1872 (aged 51–52) Passage Bridge, Portland, England
- Occupation: Sheer farmer

John Edwards (1820 – 25 November 1872) was a member of the Queensland Legislative Assembly.

He arrived in Australia around 1844 and became the lessee of Ban Ban Station in the Burnett region with his brother. He drowned aboard the Royal Adelaide when it sank at Portland in England.

== Public career ==
Edwards won the seat of Burnett in the Queensland Legislative Assembly at the 1863 Queensland colonial election. He held Burnett for two years before resigning in April 1865.

Parliament of Queensland
Preceded by Robert Mackenzie	Member for Burnett; 1863–1865; Served alongside: Robert Mackenzie	Succeeded by Charles Haly
