= Electoral district of Leichhardt (Queensland) =

Former state electoral district of Queensland, Australia

Leichhardt Queensland—Legislative Assembly
- State: Queensland
- Dates current: 1860–1932
- Namesake: Ludwig Leichhardt

Leichhardt was an electoral district of the Legislative Assembly in the Australian state of Queensland from 1860 to 1932.

Taking in areas of central Queensland west of the Great Dividing Range, the district in its original form stretched as far as Mackay in the north and as far south as Taroom. Originally a dual member constituency, it was one of the sixteen districts contested at the first colonial election in 1860. It became a single member constituency in 1873 but reverted to being a dual member electorate in 1878. A single member constituency again in 1888, it remained that way thereafter. One of the district's first members was Robert Herbert, the first Premier of Queensland.

By the time of its abolition—at the 1932 state election—the district was based on Clermont and Springsure. Its territory was split between the pre-existing districts of Barcoo and Normanby.

== Members for Leichhardt ==
Dual member electorate (1860–1873)
Member	Party	Term	Member	Party	Term
Robert Herbert	Unaligned	1860–1863	Charles Royds	Unaligned	1860–1864
Gordon Sandeman	Unaligned	1863–1870	Charles Royds	Unaligned	1860–1864
Gordon Sandeman	Unaligned	1863–1870	Edmund Royds	Unaligned	1864–1868
Gordon Sandeman	Unaligned	1863–1870	Charles Royds	Unaligned	1868–1872
John Scott	Unaligned	1870–1873	Charles Royds	Unaligned	1868–1872
John Scott	Unaligned	1870–1873	Edmund Royds	Unaligned	1872–1873

Single member electorate (1873–1878)
Member	Party	Term
Edmund Royds	Unaligned	1873–1875
Charles Haly	Unaligned	1876–1878

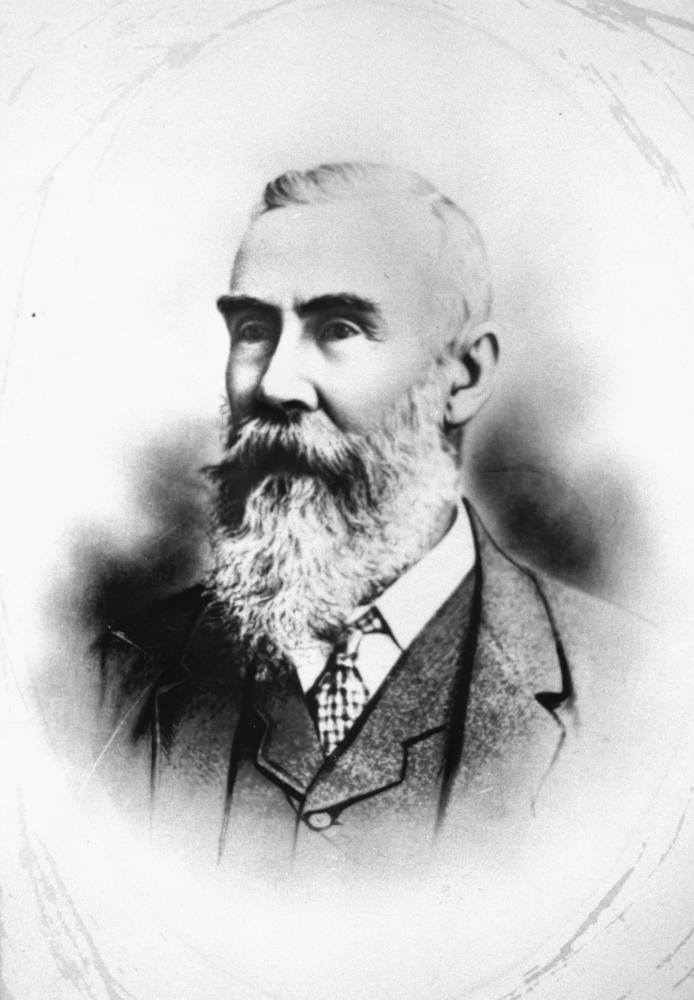
Charles Boydell Dutton, 1883

Dual member electorate (1878–1888)
Member	Party	Term	Member	Party	Term
William Sheffield Paul	Unaligned	1878–1879	John Scott	Unaligned	1878–1888
John MacFarlane	Unaligned	1879–1880	John Scott	Unaligned	1878–1888
Albrecht Feez	Unaligned	1880–1883	John Scott	Unaligned	1878–1888
Charles Dutton	Unaligned	1883–1888	John Scott	Unaligned	1878–1888

Single member electorate (1888–1932)
Member	Party	Term
William Sheffield Paul	Unaligned	1888–1893
Herbert Hardacre	Labour	1893–1919
Tom Foley	Labor	1919–1932

== See also ==
- Electoral districts of Queensland
- Members of the Queensland Legislative Assembly by year
- Category:Members of the Queensland Legislative Assembly by name
