= 1871 Queensland colonial election =

Elections were held in the Colony of Queensland (now a state of Australia) between 8 July 1871 and 6 September 1871 to elect the members of the Legislative Assembly of Queensland.

== Key dates ==
Due to problems of distance and communications, it was not possible to hold the elections on a single day.

== See also ==
- Members of the Queensland Legislative Assembly, 1871–1873
