= Herbert Hardacre =

Australian politician

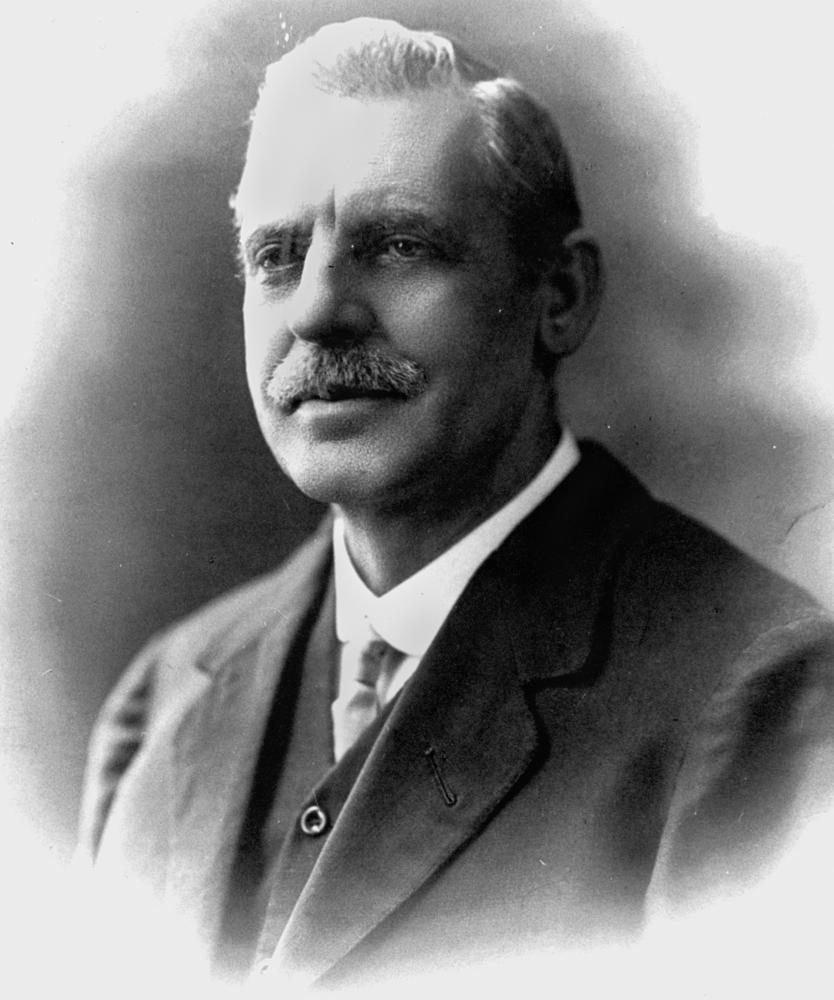
- Herbert Hardacre ca. 1919.

Member of the Queensland Legislative Assembly for Leichhardt
- In office 20 May 1893 – 14 October 1919
- Preceded by: William Paul
- Succeeded by: Tom Foley

Personal details
- Born: Herbert Freemont Hardacre; 7 March 1861 Dayton, Ohio, United States
- Died: 5 March 1938 (aged 76) Brisbane, Queensland, Australia
- Resting place: Balmoral Cemetery
- Party: Labor
- Spouse: Alice Beatrice Maynard
- Occupation: Trade union official, Judge

Herbert Freemont Hardacre (7 March 1861 – 5 March 1938) was a politician in Queensland, Australia. He was a Member of the Queensland Legislative Assembly from 1893 until 1919.

== Politics ==
Herbert Hardacre was elected to the Queensland Legislative Assembly having won Leichhardt at the 1893 colonial election as the Labor Party candidate. He was Secretary for Public Lands and Secretary for Agriculture from 1 December 1899 to 7 December 1899. He was Secretary for Public Instruction from 1 June 1915 to 9 September 1919. He held Leichhardt until he resigned on 14 October 1919 in order to take up an appointment in the Land Court. Labor candidate Tom Foley won the resulting by-election on 20 December 1919.

== Later life ==
Hardacre died in 1938 and is buried in Balmoral Cemetery.

== See also ==
- Members of the Queensland Legislative Assembly, 1893–1896; 1896-1899; 1899-1902; 1902-1904; 1904-1907; 1907-1908; 1908-1909; 1909-1912; 1912-1915; 1915-1918; 1918-1920

Parliament of Queensland
Preceded by William Paul	Member for Leichhardt; 1893–1919	Succeeded by Tom Foley
