= Sir Robert Mackenzie, 10th Baronet =

Australian politician

The Hon Sir Robert Mackenzie Bt
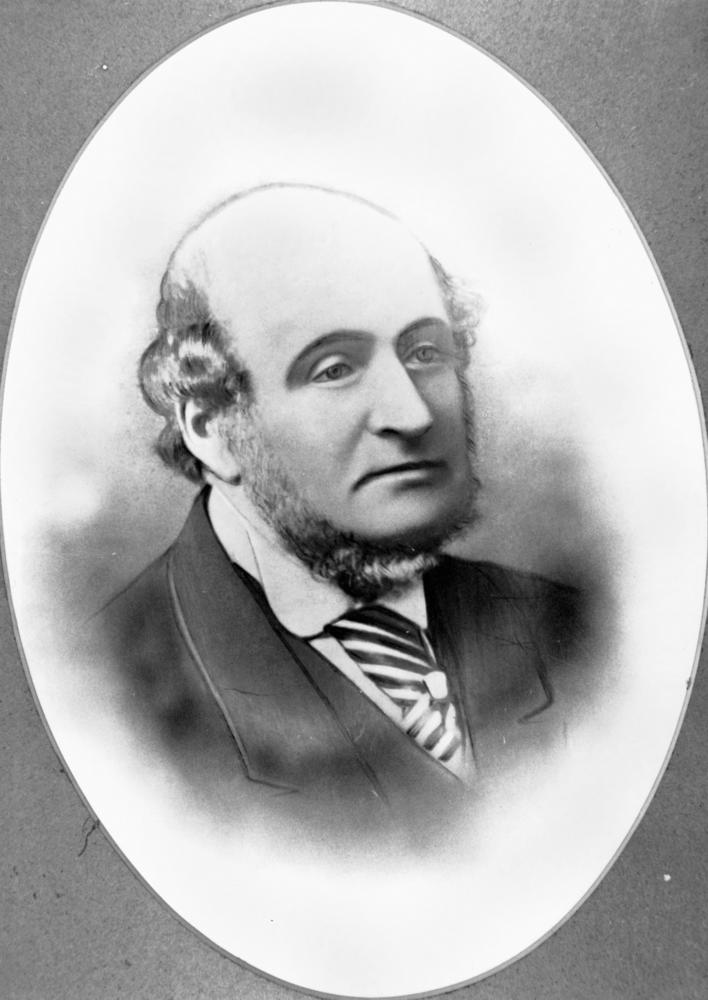
- Mackenzie in 1866

3rd Premier of Queensland
- In office 15 August 1867 – 25 November 1868
- Preceded by: Robert Herbert
- Succeeded by: Charles Lilley
- Constituency: Burnett

1st Treasurer of Queensland
- In office 15 December 1859 – 4 August 1862
- Preceded by: New position
- Succeeded by: Thomas Moffatt
- Constituency: Burnett
- In office 15 August 1867 – 25 November 1868
- Preceded by: Thomas Blacket Stephens
- Succeeded by: Thomas Henry FitzGerald
- Constituency: Burnett

Member of the Queensland Legislative Assembly for Burnett
- In office 4 May 1860 – 6 April 1869 Serving with Charles Haly, John Edwards, Ratcliffe Pring
- Preceded by: New seat
- Succeeded by: Charles Haly

Personal details
- Born: 21 July 1811 Ross-shire, Scotland, United Kingdom
- Died: 19 September 1873 (aged 62) London, United Kingdom
- Spouse: Louisa Alexandrina Jones (m.1846 d.1906)
- Relations: Sir George Mackenzie, 7th Baronet (father)
- Occupation: Magistrate, Grazier

Sir Robert Ramsay Mackenzie, 10th Baronet (21 July 1811 – 19 September 1873) was a pastoralist and politician in Queensland, Australia. He was Premier of Queensland, Australia from August 1867 to November 1868.

== Early life ==
Mackenzie was born in Coul, Ross-shire, Scotland, fourth son of Sir George Steuart Mackenzie, and wife Mary, fifth daughter of Donald Macleod of Geanies, Ross-shire.

== New South Wales ==
In April 1832 Mackenzie arrived on the Wave in Sydney, New South Wales, with £750 joining his brother James. He purchased sheep for £500 and grazed them at Riddlesdale (near Dungog, New South Wales). After land speculation with his brother James, Robert Mackenzie bought a station, got into debt and borrowed money from his Scottish relatives. His financial situation worsened and he was declared bankrupt in 1844. In 1846 he was discharged from bankruptcy and was appointed a magistrate in 1847, living in Clifton, New England.

== Political career ==
Queensland was declared a separate colony in 1859, Mackenzie became involved with politics and became Colonial Treasurer on 15 December 1859 in the ministry of Robert Herbert. Mackenzie represented Burnett in the Legislative Assembly of Queensland 1860–1869. Mackenzie formed a government on the resignation of Arthur Macalister, taking the roles of both Premier and Colonial Treasurer. He resigned on 25 November 1868.

== Personal life ==
Robert Mackenzie married Louise Alexandrina Jones, daughter of Richard Jones, a member of the New South Wales Legislative Council, Sydney, in 1846. One of their daughters, Mary Louisa (Minnie), married Alexander Archer, one of the Archer brothers. Both Minnie and Alexander died in the 1890 sinking of the RMS Quetta and are commemorated with a memorial window in the Quetta Memorial Church at Thursday Island.

Robert Mackenzie succeeded his brother William on his death on 21 December 1868 to the baronetcy and returned to live on the family estate in Scotland in 1871. Sir Robert died at 6 Atherstone Terrace, Queen’s Gate Gardens, London on 19 September 1873.

== See also ==
- Members of the Queensland Legislative Assembly, 1860–1863; 1863–1867; 1867–1868; 1868–1870

Political offices
Preceded by Robert Herbert	Premier of Queensland; 1867–1868	Succeeded by Charles Lilley
New title	Treasurer of Queensland; 1859–1862	Succeeded by Thomas Moffatt
Parliament of Queensland
New seat	Member for Burnett; 1860–1869; Served alongside: Charles Haly, John Edwards, Ratcliffe Pring	Succeeded by Charles Haly
Baronetage of Nova Scotia
Preceded by William Mackenzie	Baronet (of Coul); 1868–1873	Succeeded by Arthur Mackenzie
