= Robert Ramage (jockey) =

Australian jockey

Robert Ramage (né Ramadge; 1865−16 December 1925) was an Australian jockey who was best known for riding Carbine to victory in the 1890 Melbourne Cup.

Ramage was born in 1865 in Queen Street, Melbourne, Victoria.

Ramage died on 16 December 1925, aged 60, at a hospital in Perth, Western Australia.
