= Charles Haly =

Australian politician

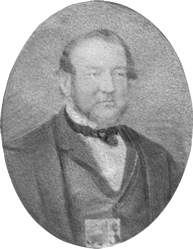

Member of the Queensland Legislative Assembly for Burnett
- In office 4 May 1860 – 24 June 1863 Serving with Robert Mackenzie
- Preceded by: New seat
- Succeeded by: John Edwards
- In office 13 May 1865 – 6 April 1867 Serving with Robert Mackenzie
- Preceded by: John Edwards
- Succeeded by: Ratcliffe Pring
- In office 21 April 1869 – 23 March 1871 Serving with Ratcliffe Pring, Berkeley Moreton
- Preceded by: Robert Mackenzie
- Succeeded by: John Bramston

Member of the Queensland Legislative Assembly for Leichhardt
- In office 12 January 1876 – 14 November 1878
- Preceded by: Edmund Royds
- Succeeded by: Seat abolished

Personal details
- Born: Charles Robert Haly; 11 April 1816 Amboise, France
- Died: 26 August 1892 (aged 76) Dalby, Queensland, Australia
- Resting place: Dalby Monumental Cemetery
- Spouse: Rosa Harpur (m.1854 d.1907)
- Occupation: Grazier, Police magistrate

Charles Robert Haly (11 April 1816 – 26 August 1892) was a pastoralist and politician in Queensland, Australia. He was a Member of the Queensland Legislative Assembly.

== Pastoralist ==
Haly and his brother William O'Grady Haly arrived in Australia from Newfoundland in 1838 and settled on the Hunter River before moving to the Gwydir River. From there they assembled a team of men and some 5,000 sheep and travelled north through the Logan district during the early 1840s in search of land. Shearing records indicate the Haly brothers had settled Taabinga station by 1846, at which time it was an established sheep property covering 305 square miles. Despite their early occupation of the land, the Haly brothers did not apply for a lease over Taabinga until June 1850, which was granted on 10 February 1852 for a term of 14 years. By 1853, Charles Haly was at Tamrookum in the Logan district, where he married Rosa Harpur and was to remain until at least 1854. During this time it is most likely that either William Haly or a superintendent was managing Taabinga station. When his brother William returned to England in 1859, Charles became sole lessee of Taabinga. In 1863 he acquired a freehold over 314 acres of the run and remained at the property until 1875 when he moved to Dalby.

== Politics ==
Charles Haly was elected to the Queensland Legislative Assembly in Burnett at the inaugural 1860 colonial election on 4 May 1860. He held the seat until the 1863 election on 24 June.

On the 19 June 1861 C. R. Haly, Esq., M.P., was a witness at the Select Committee on the Native Police Force, at which he supported the work of the Native Police.

On 15 April 1865, John Edwards, the member for Burnett, resigned. Charles Haly won the resulting by-election on 13 May 1865. He held the seat until 6 April 1867.

On 6 April 1869, Robert Mackenzie, former premier and member for Burnett, retired from politics and departed for Europe. Charles Haly won the resulting by-election on 21 April 1869. Haley held the seat until he resigned on 23 March 1871. John Bramston won the resulting by-election on 3 April 1871.

On 8 December 1875, Edmund Royds, member for Leichhardt, resigned. Charles Haly won the resulting by-election on 12 January 1876. He held the seat until 14 November 1878 (the 1878 election).

== Later life ==
Haly died in 1892 and was buried in Dalby Monumental Cemetery.

== Legacy ==
Haly's Taabinga Homestead was listed on the Queensland Heritage Register in 1992.

Haly Creek (the watercourse) and Haly Creek (the locality) are both named in Haly's honour.

== See also ==
- Members of the Queensland Legislative Assembly, 1860–1863; 1863-1867; 1868-1870; 1870-1871; 1873-1878

Parliament of Queensland
New seat	Member for Burnett; 1860–1863; Served alongside: Robert Mackenzie	Succeeded by John Edwards
Preceded by John Edwards	Member for Burnett; 1865–1867; Served alongside: Robert Mackenzie	Succeeded by Ratcliffe Pring
Preceded by Robert Mackenzie	Member for Burnett; 1869–1871; Served alongside: Ratcliffe Pring, Berkeley Moreton	Succeeded by John Bramston
Preceded by Edmund Royds	Member for Leichhardt; 1876–1878	Abolished
