= Thomas Archer (pastoralist) =

Scottish-born Australian pioneer pastoralist

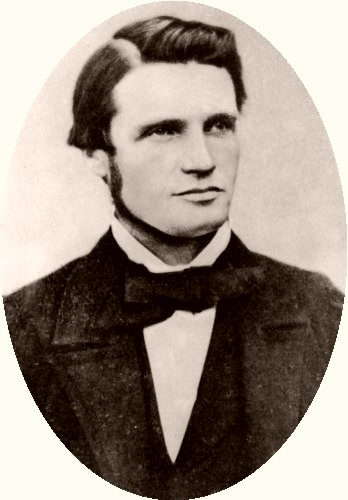
Thomas Archer (1823-1905)

Thomas Archer, CMG (27 February 1823 – 9 December 1905) was a pioneer pastoralist and Agent General for Queensland (Australia).

== Early life ==
Archer was the son of William Archer and his wife Julia née Walker and was born in Glasgow, Scotland. When aged three years he was taken to Larvik, Norway. Thomas was one of thirteen children.

== Pastoralist and Agent-general ==
At fourteen (or sixteen) years of age, Archer and his brother emigrated to Australia, arriving at Sydney on 31 December 1837. Another brother David had arrived earlier in 1834. Other brothers William and Thomas followed in 1838 and sought land in New South Wales.

In 1848 to 1849 Thomas Archer left and went to the California goldfields, returned briefly to Queensland and then went to England. In 1853, he married Grace Lindsay.

By 1880, Archer had returned to London; from 1881 to 1884 and 1884 to 1980 he was agent-general for Queensland. During this time, he wrote and published The History Resources And Future Prospects of Queensland (London 1881); Queensland: Her History, Resources, And Future Prospects (London, 1882), and Alleged Slavery In Queensland (1883). He also wrote Recollections of a Rambling Life (1897), printed in Yokohama for private circulation, which described his early years in Australia and his experiences in California.

== Late life and legacy ==
Archer lived in near London until his death on 9 December 1905, survived by his wife and children. He was created Companion of the Order of St Michael and St George (CMG) in 1884. Archer did much valuable exploratory work during the early days, but is not regarded conventionally as a major explorer because he did not explore with definite objectives.
