= John Scott (Queensland politician) =

Australian politician

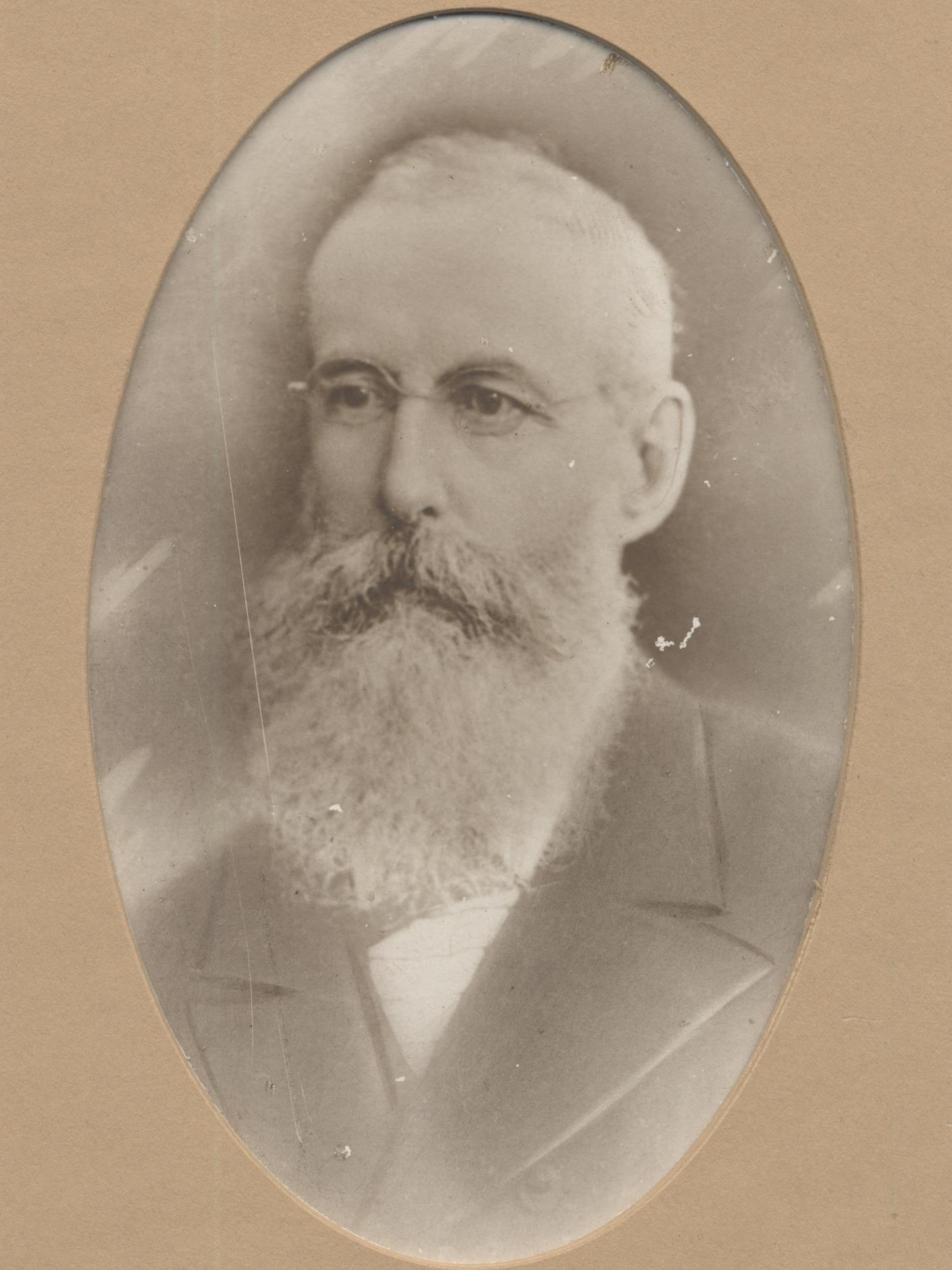

Member of the Queensland Legislative Assembly for Clermont
- In office 22 June 1868 – 1 October 1868
- Preceded by: Charles Fitzsimmons
- Succeeded by: Robert Travers Atkin

Member of the Queensland Legislative Assembly for Leichhardt
- In office 13 September 1870 – 4 November 1873
- Preceded by: Gordon Sandeman
- Succeeded by: Seat abolished
- In office 14 November 1878 – 5 May 1888 Serving with Charles Royds, Edmund Royds
- Preceded by: New seat
- Succeeded by: Seat abolished

Member of the Queensland Legislative Assembly for Springsure
- In office 4 November 1873 – 14 November 1878
- Preceded by: New seat
- Succeeded by: Seat abolished

Member of the Queensland Legislative Council
- In office 23 August 1888 – 26 June 1890

Personal details
- Born: 20 June 1821 Edinburgh, Scotland
- Died: 2 July 1898 (aged 77) Lucerne, Brisbane, Queensland
- Resting place: Toowong Cemetery
- Spouse: Agnes Thomson
- Occupation: Squatter

John Scott (20 June 1821 – 2 July 1898) was a grazier, company director and politician in colonial Queensland.

Scott was born in Edinburgh, Scotland, the son of John Scott and his wife Marion Purves. John Scott junior's wife was Agnes Thomson who died in July 1892.

== Business life ==
Scott was educated at the University of St Andrews and the University of Edinburgh, where he studied medicine. He arrived in New South Wales in 1843. For a time he was a squatter in Goulburn, New South Wales. Between 1851 and 1852 he was in the United Kingdom. He went to Queensland in 1855. He stocked Palm-Tree Creek, Dawson which he sold in 1865 but acquired further stations. Scott was a director of City Mutual Life Assurance Society and vice president of The Royal National Agricultural and Industrial Association of Queensland. Scott was a trustee of Brisbane Grammar School from 1874 to 1888 and Honorary Treasurer from 1877 to 1886.

== Political career ==
Scott was both a member of the Legislative Assembly of Queensland and the Queensland Legislative Council in a political career lasting from 1868 till 1890.

He was Chairman of Committees of the Legislative Assembly, 15 November 1871 to 1 September 1873 and 21 January 1879 to 26 July 1883.

Scott died at Lucerne, Milton, Brisbane, Queensland in 1898 and was buried in Toowong Cemetery.

== Family ==
John Scott and his wife Agnes had five children:

- Ada Frances (1855–1905), the wife of George Neville Griffiths M.L.A. Griffiths and Ada Frances were the grandparents of William Charles Wentworth M.P. (1907-2003)
- Arthur (1857–1874)
- Dr. Eric Scott (b. 1859)
- Florence (b. 1860)
- Constance

== See also ==
- Political families of Australia: Wentworth/Hill/Griffiths/Scott/Cooper family

Parliament of Queensland
Preceded by Charles Fitzsimmons	Member for Clermont; 1868	Succeeded by Robert Travers Atkin
Preceded by Gordon Sandeman	Member for Leichhardt; 1870 – 1873	Abolished
New seat	Member for Springsure; 1873 – 1878	Abolished
New seat	Member for Leichhardt; 1878 – 1888; Served alongside: Charles Royds, Edmund Royds	Abolished
