= Electoral results for the district of Burnett =

Queensland, Australia, district election results

This is a list of electoral results for the electoral district of Burnett in Queensland state elections.

== Members for Burnett ==
First incarnation (1860–1873, 2 members)
Member	Party	Term
Charles Haly	Squatter-Conservative	1860–1863
Robert Mackenzie	Squatter-Conservative	1860–1869
John Edwards	Squatter-Conservative	1863–1865
Charles Haly	Squatter-Conservative	1865–1867
Ratcliffe Pring	Squatter-Conservative	1867–1870
Charles Haly	Squatter-Conservative	1869–1871
Berkeley Moreton	Independent Liberal	1870–1871
John Bramston	Squatter-Conservative	1871–1873
Walter Scott	Squatter-Conservative	1871–1873
Second incarnation (1873–1932, 1 member)
Member	Party	Term
Francis Ivory	Squatter-Conservative	1873–1878
William Henry Baynes	Squatter-Conservative	1878–1883
Berkeley Moreton	Liberal	1883–1888
George Hall Jones	Unaligned	1888–1891
James John Cadell	Conservative	1891–1896
William McCord	Conservative	1896–1898
William Ryott Maughan	Labor	1898–1899
William Kent	Ministerialist	1899–1904
Alfred Jones	Labor	1904–1909
Robert Hodge	Ministerialist	1909–1912
Bernard Corser	Liberal/National	1912–1928
Robert Boyd	Country and Progressive National	1928–1932
Third incarnation (1960–present, 1 member)
Member	Party	Term
Claude Wharton	Country	1960–1974
Claude Wharton	National	1974–1986
Doug Slack	National	1986–2001
Trevor Strong	Labor	2001–2004
Rob Messenger	National	2004–2008
Rob Messenger	Liberal National	2008–2010
Rob Messenger	Independent	2010–2012
Stephen Bennett	Liberal National	2012–present

== Election results ==
=== Elections in the 2020s ===
2024 Queensland state election: Burnett
Party	Candidate	Votes	%	±%
Liberal National	Stephen Bennett	18,247	50.07	+1.46
Labor	Kerri Morgan	9,202	25.25	−5.46
One Nation	Arno Blank	4,716	12.94	+3.96
Legalise Cannabis	Malcolm Parry	1,778	4.88	+4.88
Greens	Esther Vale	1,375	3.77	−0.78
Independent	Paul Hudson	1,128	3.09	−1.15 (Note: Compared to results as a Katter's Australian Party candidate at the 2020 election.)
Total formal votes		36,446	95.70	−0.31
Informal votes		1,639	4.30	+0.31
Turnout		38,085	90.62	−0.81
Two-party-preferred result
Liberal National	Stephen Bennett	23,843	65.42	+4.63
Labor	Kerri Morgan	12,603	34.58	−4.63
Liberal National hold		Swing	+4.63	

2020 Queensland state election: Burnett
Party	Candidate	Votes	%	±%
Liberal National	Stephen Bennett	15,330	48.61	+6.16
Labor	Kerri Morgan	9,686	30.71	+5.42
One Nation	Geoffrey Mansell	2,832	8.98	−17.72
Greens	Liam Johns	1,436	4.55	−1.00
Katter's Australian	Paul Hudson	1,336	4.24	+4.24
Informed Medical Options	Elizabeth Case	682	2.16	+2.16
Independent	Ric Glass	235	0.75	+0.75
Total formal votes		31,537	96.01	−0.08
Informal votes		1,311	3.99	+0.08
Turnout		32,848	91.43	+0.82
Two-party-preferred result
Liberal National	Stephen Bennett	19,172	60.79	+0.14
Labor	Kerri Morgan	12,365	39.21	−0.14
Liberal National hold		Swing	+0.14	

=== Elections in the 2010s ===
2017 Queensland state election: Burnett
Party	Candidate	Votes	%	±%
Liberal National	Stephen Bennett	12,570	42.4	−4.1
One Nation	Ashley Lynch	7,907	26.7	+26.7
Labor	Lee Harvey	7,491	25.3	−4.4
Greens	Tim Roberts	1,646	5.6	+0.7
Total formal votes		29,614	96.1	−1.5
Informal votes		1,205	3.9	+1.5
Turnout		30,819	90.6	+1.4
Two-party-preferred result
Liberal National	Stephen Bennett	17,962	60.7	+4.1
Labor	Lee Harvey	11,652	39.4	−4.1
Liberal National hold		Swing	+4.1	

2015 Queensland state election: Burnett
Party	Candidate	Votes	%	±%
Liberal National	Stephen Bennett	14,434	47.19	+7.18
Labor	Bryan Mustill	9,134	29.86	+13.61
Palmer United	Richard Love	4,445	14.53	+14.53
Greens	Colin Sheppard	1,439	4.70	+0.95
Independent	Peter Wyatt	1,134	3.71	+3.71
Total formal votes		30,586	97.57	−0.34
Informal votes		763	2.43	+0.34
Turnout		31,349	92.19	+0.30
Two-party-preferred result
Liberal National	Stephen Bennett	15,494	56.80	–1.69
Labor	Bryan Mustill	11,782	43.20	+43.20
Liberal National hold		Swing	N/A	

2012 Queensland state election: Burnett
Party	Candidate	Votes	%	±%
Liberal National	Stephen Bennett	11,368	40.01	−16.64
Independent	Rob Messenger	6,821	24.00	+24.00
Labor	Stuart Tomlinson	4,618	16.25	−18.39
Katter's Australian	Kevin Pauling	4,542	15.98	+15.98
Greens	David Eastland	1,066	3.75	−1.23
Total formal votes		28,415	97.91	−0.16
Informal votes		608	2.09	+0.16
Turnout		29,023	91.88	−0.19
Two-candidate-preferred result
Liberal National	Stephen Bennett	13,110	58.50	−2.60
Independent	Rob Messenger	9,302	41.50	+41.50
Liberal National gain from Independent		Swing	N/A	

=== Elections in the 2000s ===
2009 Queensland state election: Burnett
Party	Candidate	Votes	%	±%
Liberal National	Rob Messenger	15,055	56.6	−0.8
Labor	Chris Pianta	9,206	34.6	−7.9
Greens	Bernie Williams	1,324	5.0	+5.0
Independent	Peter Wyatt	760	2.9	+2.9
Independent	Robert Bromwich	232	0.9	+0.9
Total formal votes		26,577	97.9	
Informal votes		524	2.1	
Turnout		27,101	92.1	
Two-party-preferred result
Liberal National	Rob Messenger	15,432	61.1	+3.7
Labor	Chris Pianta	9,824	38.9	−3.7
Liberal National hold		Swing	+3.7	

2006 Queensland state election: Burnett
Party	Candidate	Votes	%	±%
National	Rob Messenger	14,469	57.6	+5.0
Labor	Denise Williams	10,663	42.4	−5.0
Total formal votes		25,132	97.3	−0.1
Informal votes		692	2.7	+0.1
Turnout		25,824	92.3	−0.7
National hold		Swing	+5.0	

2004 Queensland state election: Burnett
Party	Candidate	Votes	%	±%
National	Rob Messenger	12,526	52.6	+4.3
Labor	Trevor Strong	11,308	47.4	−4.3
Total formal votes		23,834	97.4	+2.6
Informal votes		624	2.6	−2.6
Turnout		24,458	93.0	−0.3
National gain from Labor		Swing	+4.3	

2001 Queensland state election: Burnett
Party	Candidate	Votes	%	±%
Labor	Trevor Strong	11,169	51.7	+25.0
National	Doug Slack	10,433	48.3	+16.1
Total formal votes		21,602	94.8	
Informal votes		1,179	5.2	
Turnout		22,781	93.3	
Labor gain from National		Swing	+11.0	

=== Elections in the 1990s ===
1998 Queensland state election: Burnett
Party	Candidate	Votes	%	±%
One Nation	Glen Onoprienko	10,076	36.4	+36.4
National	Doug Slack	8,993	32.5	−28.6
Labor	Greg McMahon	7,607	27.5	−11.4
Greens	Christine Kret	786	2.8	+2.8
Independent	Richard Smith	201	0.7	+0.7
Total formal votes		27,663	98.9	+0.4
Informal votes		312	1.1	−0.4
Turnout		27,975	94.0	+0.6
Two-candidate-preferred result
National	Doug Slack	12,648	52.3	−8.8
One Nation	Glen Onoprienko	11,521	47.7	+47.7
National hold		Swing	−8.8	

1995 Queensland state election: Burnett
Party	Candidate	Votes	%	±%
National	Doug Slack	14,962	61.1	+15.0
Labor	Barbara Woods	9,530	38.9	+3.7
Total formal votes		24,492	98.5	+0.6
Informal votes		371	1.5	−0.6
Turnout		24,863	93.4	
National hold		Swing	+1.6	

1992 Queensland state election: Burnett
Party	Candidate	Votes	%	±%
National	Doug Slack	9,776	46.1	+6.4
Labor	Michael Klein	7,479	35.2	−3.1
Independent	Maurice Chapman	2,047	9.6	−1.8
Confederate Action	Bill May	1,927	9.1	+9.1
Total formal votes		21,229	97.9	
Informal votes		450	2.1	
Turnout		21,679	92.2	
Two-party-preferred result
National	Doug Slack	12,113	59.5	+2.7
Labor	Michael Klein	8,247	40.5	−2.7
National hold		Swing	+2.7	

=== Elections in the 1980s ===
1989 Queensland state election: Burnett
Party	Candidate	Votes	%	±%
National	Doug Slack	6,584	46.6	−18.5
Labor	Vicki Pritchett	4,786	33.9	−1.0
Independent	Maurice Chapman	1,618	11.5	+11.5
Liberal	Alex Warren	1,131	8.0	+8.0
Total formal votes		14,119	97.9	+0.1
Informal votes		299	2.1	−0.1
Turnout		14,418	92.6	−0.5
Two-party-preferred result
National	Doug Slack	8,627	61.1	−4.0
Labor	Vicki Pritchett	5,492	38.9	+4.0
National hold		Swing	−4.0	

1986 Queensland state election: Burnett
Party	Candidate	Votes	%	±%
National	Doug Slack	8,165	65.1	−0.2
Labor	Robin Webcke	4,378	34.9	+0.2
Total formal votes		12,543	97.8	
Informal votes		277	2.2	
Turnout		12,820	93.1	
National hold		Swing	−0.2	

1983 Queensland state election: Burnett
Party	Candidate	Votes	%	±%
National	Claude Wharton	8,709	66.1	−3.7
Labor	Graham Betts	4,461	33.9	+3.7
Total formal votes		13,170	99.1	+0.1
Informal votes		124	0.9	−0.1
Turnout		13,294	93.3	+1.7
National hold		Swing	−3.7	

1980 Queensland state election: Burnett
Party	Candidate	Votes	%	±%
National	Claude Wharton	8,212	69.8	+0.5
Labor	Edgar Roberts	3,544	30.2	−0.5
Total formal votes		11,756	99.0	+0.3
Informal votes		121	1.0	−0.3
Turnout		11,877	91.6	+0.2
National hold		Swing	+0.5	

=== Elections in the 1970s ===
1977 Queensland state election: Burnett
Party	Candidate	Votes	%	±%
National	Claude Wharton	7,817	69.3	−4.8
Labor	Andrew Jackson	3,457	30.7	+4.8
Total formal votes		11,274	98.7	
Informal votes		151	1.3	
Turnout		11,425	91.4	
National hold		Swing	−4.8	

1974 Queensland state election: Burnett
Party	Candidate	Votes	%	±%
National	Claude Wharton	7,951	74.1	+8.2
Labor	Ken Green	2,784	25.9	−2.7
Total formal votes		10,735	99.1	+0.4
Informal votes		100	0.9	−0.4
Turnout		10,835	92.3	+0.6
National hold		Swing	+3.6	

1972 Queensland state election: Burnett
Party	Candidate	Votes	%	±%
Country	Claude Wharton	6,383	65.9	+0.6
Labor	Granville Batkines	2,772	28.6	−6.1
Queensland Labor	Leonard Galligan	535	5.5	+5.5
Total formal votes		9,690	98.7	
Informal votes		132	1.3	
Turnout		9,822	91.7	
Two-party-preferred result
Country	Claude Wharton	6,828	70.5	+5.2
Labor	Granville Batkines	2,862	29.5	−5.2
Country hold		Swing	+5.2	

=== Elections in the 1960s ===
1969 Queensland state election: Burnett
Party	Candidate	Votes	%	±%
Country	Claude Wharton	6,257	65.9	+2.3
Labor	Alexander Craig	3,235	34.1	−2.3
Total formal votes		9,492	98.9	0.0
Informal votes		105	1.1	0.0
Turnout		9,597	94.3	−0.3
Country hold		Swing	+2.3	

1966 Queensland state election: Burnett
Party	Candidate	Votes	%	±%
Country	Claude Wharton	5,934	63.6	−1.5
Labor	Alexander Craig	3,402	36.4	+1.5
Total formal votes		9,336	98.9	−0.1
Informal votes		106	1.1	+0.1
Turnout		9,442	94.6	−0.7
Country hold		Swing	−1.5	

1963 Queensland state election: Burnett
Party	Candidate	Votes	%	±%
Country	Claude Wharton	5,947	65.1	+10.2
Labor	Denis Grace	3,185	34.9	+7.7
Total formal votes		9,132	99.0	−0.2
Informal votes		88	1.0	+0.2
Turnout		9,220	95.3	+1.6
Country hold		Swing	N/A	

1960 Queensland state election: Burnett
Party	Candidate	Votes	%	±%
Country	Claude Wharton	4,969	54.9	
Labor	Denis Grace	2,459	27.2	
Queensland Labor	Edward McDonnell	1,616	17.9	
Total formal votes		9,044	99.2	
Informal votes		75	0.8	
Country hold		Swing		

=== Elections in the 1920s ===
1929 Queensland state election: Burnett
Party	Candidate	Votes	%	±%
CPNP	Robert Boyd	4,281	60.0	−2.2
Labor	Robert Martin	2,855	40.0	+2.2
Total formal votes		7,136	98.4	+0.1
Informal votes		116	1.6	−0.1
Turnout		7,252	91.7	+0.7
CPNP hold		Swing	−2.2	

1926 Queensland state election: Burnett
Party	Candidate	Votes	%	±%
CPNP	Bernard Corser	3,763	62.2	+4.4
Labor	Bill Baxter	2,283	37.8	−2.0
Total formal votes		6,046	98.3	−0.5
Informal votes		103	1.7	+0.5
Turnout		6,149	91.0	+4.1
CPNP hold		Swing	N/A	

1923 Queensland state election: Burnett
Party	Candidate	Votes	%	±%
Country	Bernard Corser	3,114	57.8	−8.4
Labor	William McMahon	2,144	39.8	+6.0
Independent	Fred Saidy	133	2.5	+2.5
Total formal votes		5,391	98.8	−0.5
Informal votes		66	1.2	+0.5
Turnout		5,457	86.9	+2.9
Country hold		Swing	N/A	

1920 Queensland state election: Burnett
Party	Candidate	Votes	%	±%
Country	Bernard Corser	3,129	66.2	+66.2
Labor	Francis Hill	1,596	33.8	−7.6
Total formal votes		4,725	99.3	0.0
Informal votes		33	0.7	0.0
Turnout		4,758	84.0	+1.0
Country gain from National		Swing	N/A	

=== Elections in the 1910s ===
1918 Queensland state election: Burnett
Party	Candidate	Votes	%	±%
National	Bernard Corser	2,642	58.6	+2.5
Labor	Joseph Warmington	1,865	41.4	−2.5
Total formal votes		4,507	99.3	+0.2
Informal votes		31	0.7	−0.2
Turnout		4,538	83.0	−6.0
National hold		Swing	+2.5	

1915 Queensland state election: Burnett
Party	Candidate	Votes	%	±%
Liberal	Bernard Corser	2,296	56.1	+3.0
Labor	Albert Mack	1,793	43.9	−3.0
Total formal votes		4,089	99.1	+0.8
Informal votes		38	0.9	−0.8
Turnout		4,127	89.0	+11.0
Liberal hold		Swing	+3.0	

1912 Queensland state election: Burnett
Party	Candidate	Votes	%	±%
Liberal	Bernard Corser	1,603	53.1	
Labor	Alfred Jones	1,415	46.9	
Total formal votes		3,018	98.3	
Informal votes		53	1.7	
Turnout		3,071	78.0	
Liberal hold		Swing		
