= 1888 Queensland colonial election =

- 28 April – 26 May 1988

All seats in the Legislative Assembly of Queensland
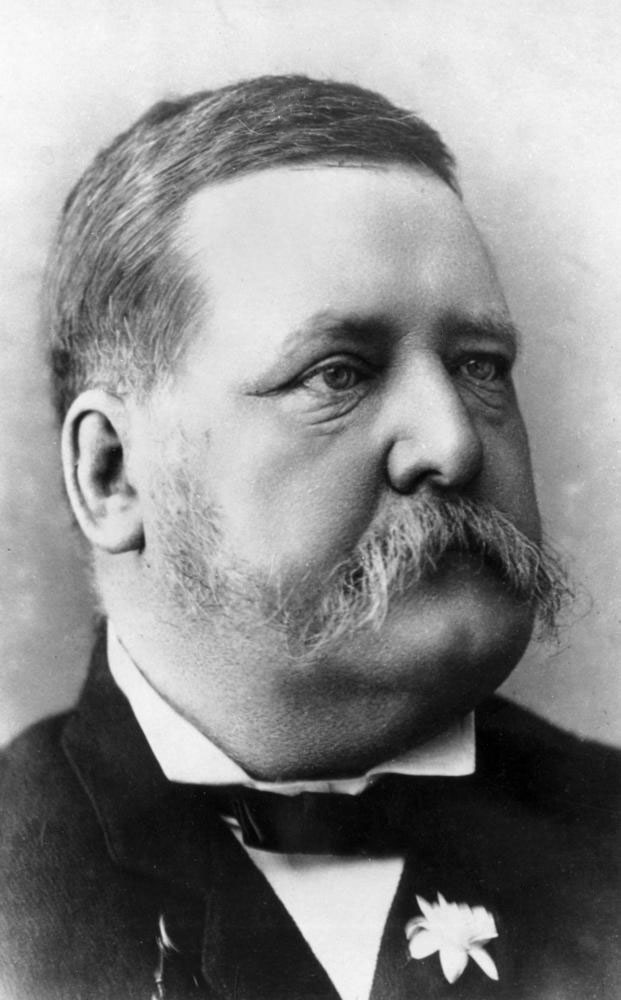

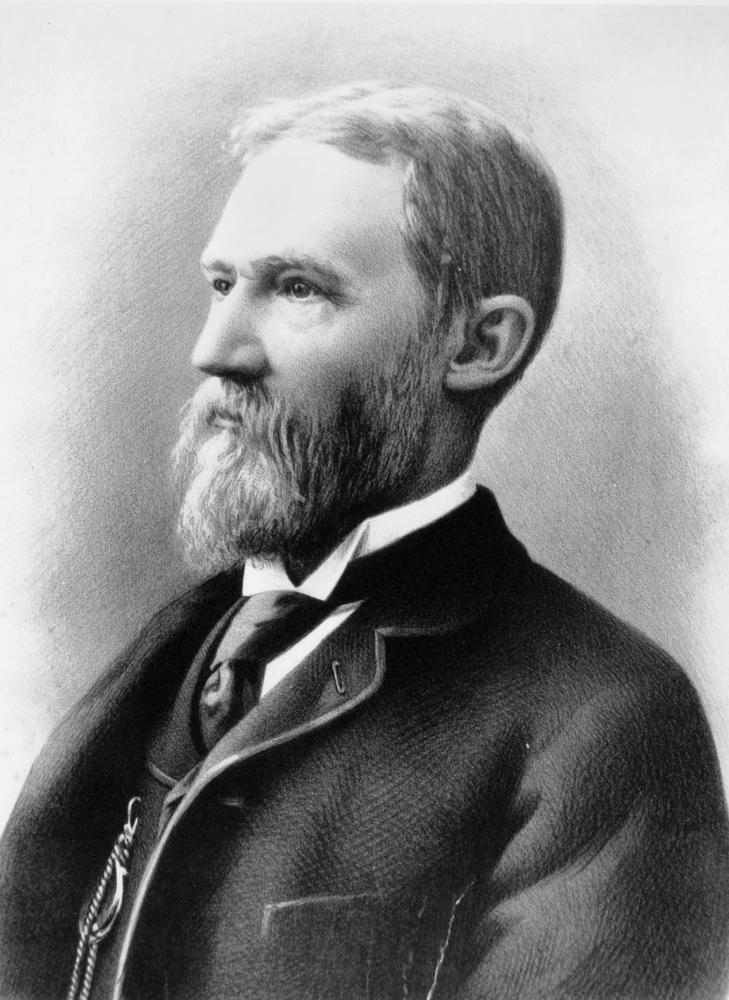
	First party	Second party	Third party
			ALP
Leader	Thomas McIlwraith	Samuel Griffith	No leader
Party	Conservative	Liberal	Labour
Leader's seat	North Brisbane	North Brisbane	N/A
Seats won	47	24	1
Premier before election
Samuel Griffith
Liberal
Elected Premier
Thomas McIlwraith
Conservative

The 1888 Queensland colonial election was held between 28 April and 26 May 1888 to elect all members of the Legislative Assembly of Queensland.

The election was a decisive defeat for Samuel Griffith's Liberals, with Thomas McIlwraith's Conservatives (also called Nationalists) becoming ascendant.

The Labour Party contested its first election, winning one seat.

== Key dates ==
Due to problems of distance and communications, it was not possible to hold the elections on a single day.

== See also ==
- Members of the Queensland Legislative Assembly, 1888–1893
