= William Fryar =

Australian politician

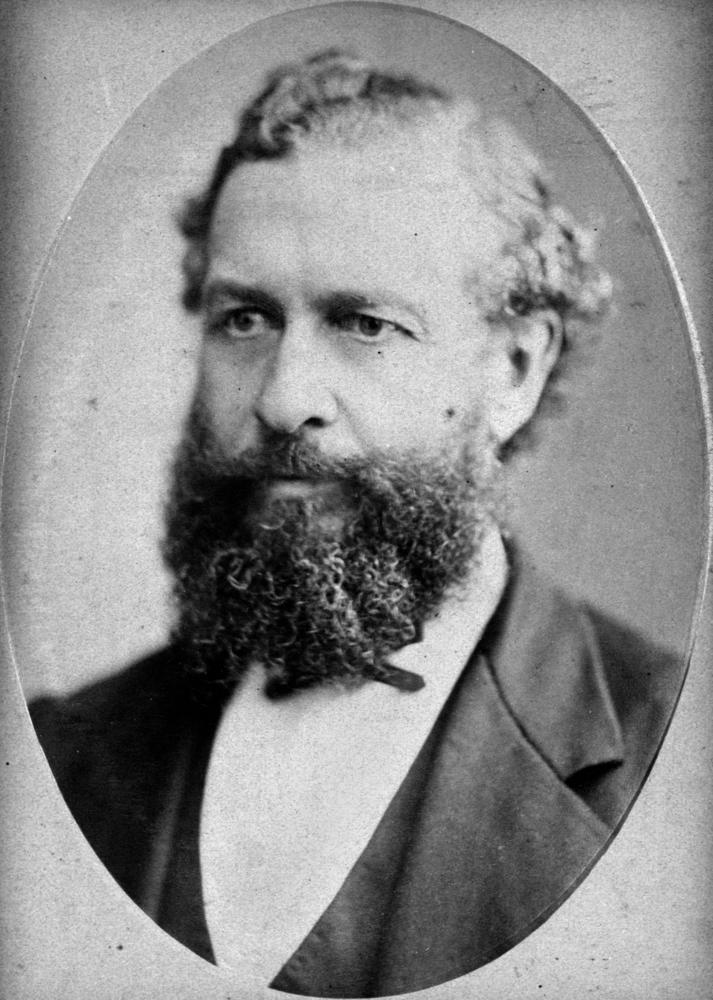
- William Fryar in 1875

Member of the Queensland Legislative Assembly for East Moreton
- In office 18 November 1873 – 24 April 1877
- Preceded by: Samuel Griffith
- Succeeded by: James Garrick

Personal details
- Born: 25 January 1828 Willington, Northumberland, England
- Died: 22 December 1912 (aged 84) Coorparoo, Brisbane
- Resting place: Toowong Cemetery
- Occupation: Surveyor, sugar planter

William Fryar (25 January 1828 – 22 December 1912) was an early Australian surveyor, politician, businessman and mining inspector in Queensland, Australia.

== Biography ==
Fryar was born on 25 January 1828 at Willington, Northumberland, England, the son of Thomas Fryar (mining engineer), and his wife Mary Ann, née Scott. He immigrated to Queensland, Australia in 1853. At intervals between 1864 and 1882, Fryar worked in the Lands Department as a licensed surveyor in the south-eastern regions of Maroochy and Mooloolah.

In 1869, Fryar went into partnership with James Strachan and established the first sugar mill on the river at Loganholme. This was initially a very successful business that employed up to 100 men at crushing time. However, they were declared insolvent in 1876, because of problems with the delivery of new equipment from Glasgow. Fryar returned to his occupation as a surveyor.

On 18 November 1873, he joined the seventh Queensland parliament as the member for East Moreton in the Legislative Assembly where he was mainly interested in land policy. In May 1875, Fryar replaced Thomas Stephens who resigned as the Secretary for Lands in the third Arthur Macalister ministry, until its fall on 5 June 1876. He remained the member for East Moreton until he resigned in 1877, again returning to surveying.

In 1882, Fryar became the first Queensland inspector of mines and held the senior post, the Southern Division, until he retired in June 1904. He had become one of the first directors of the Queensland Evangelical Standard, a Dissenting weekly of strong political character, established on 10 June 1875.

In 1857 at Brisbane he had married Margaret Louisa Lewis. Of their ten children only two sons and two daughters survived him. Fryar died in Coorparoo, Brisbane on 22 December 1912 and was buried in Toowong Cemetery.

== Career highlights ==
- 1853 Arrived in Queensland, Australia
- 1864 – 1882 Licensed Surveyor with the Queensland Lands Department (multiple non-successive posts)
- 1874 – 1877 Independent Member for East Moreton in the Legislative Assembly
- 1875 – 1876 Secretary for Public Lands
- 1882 – 1904 First Queensland Inspector of Mines

== Legacy ==
- Fryar Street in Camp Hill, Brisbane, was named after the family.
- Fryar Creek, which runs into Baroon Pocket Dam, was named after William Fryar.
- Fryar Road in Eagleby, Queensland, was named after Willian Fryar.

== Bibliography ==
- Morrison, A.A. (1881). Religion and Politics in Queensland. Historical Society of Queensland. Vol 4, no 4, December 1951, pp 455–70.
- Stoodley, June. (1964). The Queensland Gold-Miner in the Late Nineteenth Century. M.A. thesis, University of Queensland.
- Gaylord, M. (1967). Economic Development in the Maroochy District until 1915. B.A. thesis, University of Queensland.
- Fryar, William (1895). The development and progress of mining and geology in Queensland. Australasian Association for the Advancement of Science Report. Volume 6, 1895, pp. 361–375.

Parliament of Queensland
Preceded by Samuel Griffith	Member for East Moreton; 1873–1877	Succeeded by James Garrick
