= Samuel Grimes =

Australian politician

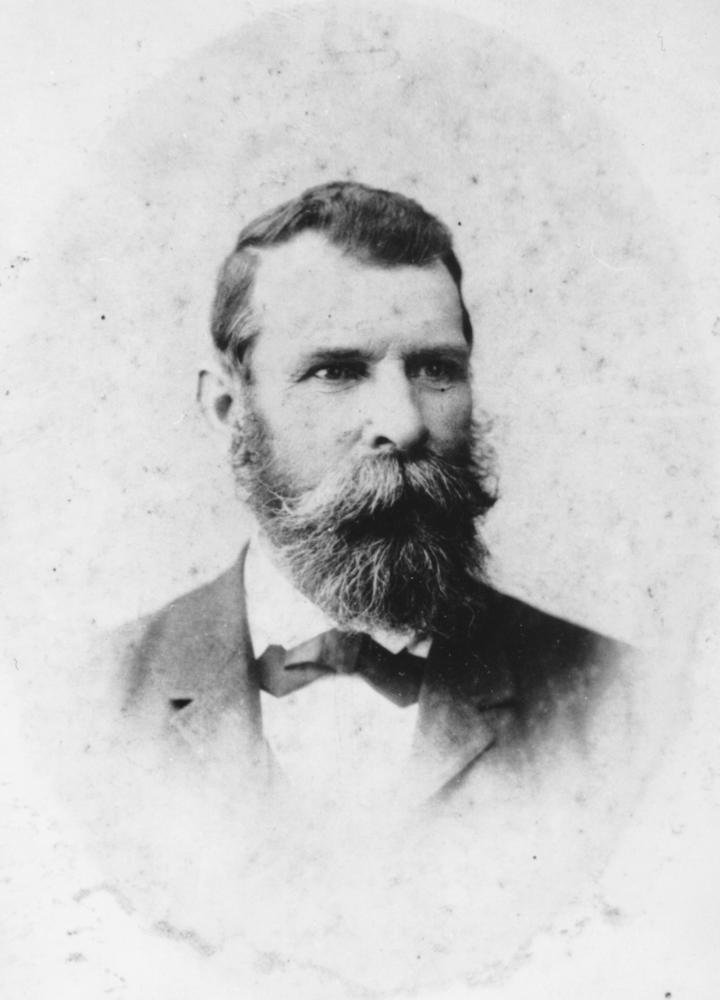
Samuel Grimes 1889

Samuel Grimes was a politician in Queensland, Australia. He was a Member of the Queensland Legislative Assembly

== Early life ==
Samuel was born on 13 August 1837 at Ashby-de-la-Zouch, Leicestershire, England, and arrived in the part of the Colony of New South Wales that would later become Queensland on the ship Chaseley in 1849. He was involved in farming in a number of areas around Moreton Bay from 1857 and was responsible for developing a sugar plantation on Hope Island in the Coomera River.

== Politics ==
Grimes was elected to the Queensland Legislative Assembly in the electorate of Oxley on 3 December 1878 in the 1878 Queensland election.

Grimes was sued for libel under an action taken by Thomas McIlwraith in May 1888. The suit involved words used in a speech made at the declaration of the poll at Oxley on 19 May 1888 in the 1888 Queensland election when Grimes stated, amongst other things, "He might also mention that his opponent and his friends were extremely lavish of their money".

He represented Oxley until his death on 18 June 1902.

== Later life ==
Grimes died on 18 June 1902 of pneumonia after a short illness.
