= Walter Scott (Queensland politician) =

Australian politician

Member of the Queensland Legislative Assembly for Burnett
- In office 7 November 1871 – 20 November 1873 Serving with John Bramston
- Preceded by: Berkeley Moreton
- Succeeded by: Francis Ivory

Member of the Queensland Legislative Assembly for Mulgrave
- In office 20 November 1873 – 21 November 1878
- Preceded by: New seat
- Succeeded by: Thomas McIlwraith

Personal details
- Born: Walter Scott c. 1844 Castlereagh River, New South Wales Colony
- Died: 7 October 1890 (aged 46) Taromeo, Queensland, Australia
- Party: Squatter-conservative
- Spouse: Mary Catherine Martin (m.1875)
- Occupation: Station proprietor

Walter Scott (1844 – 7 October 1890) was a member of the Queensland Legislative Assembly. To the people of Bundaberg, he was known as "Honest George".

== Biography ==
Scott was born at Castlereagh River, New South Wales, the son of Simon Scott and his wife Christina (née Swanson). After his arrival in Queensland he was a station proprietor and manager.

In 1875, he married Mary Catherine Martin and together had three sons and two daughters. Scott died in October 1890 at Taromeo.

== Public career ==
Scott represented the Queensland Legislative Assembly seats of Burnett from 1871 until 1873 and Mulgrave from 1873 until 1878.

Parliament of Queensland
| Preceded by Berkeley Moreton | Member for Burnett; 1871–1873; Served alongside: John Bramston | Succeeded by Francis Ivory |
| New seat | Member for Mulgrave; 1873–1878 | Succeeded by Thomas McIlwraith |
