= Conservative Party (Queensland) =

- Historic leaders: Thomas McIlwraith; Boyd Dunlop Morehead; Robert Philp
- Dissolved: 1908
- Merged into: Liberal Party

The Conservative Party, also known simply as the Conservatives, was an Australian political party in Queensland active from the 19th century until early 1900s. It was largely associated with former premiers Thomas McIlwraith and Robert Philp, to the point where it was sometimes referred to as the McIlwraith Conservatives or Philp Conservatives respectively.

Although party structures in colonial politics were informal, the Conservatives had multiple leaders and competed in elections until they merged with the Kidstonites to become the Liberal Party in 1908.

== History ==
The first Queensland Premier, Robert Herbert, was a Squatter-Conservative. 'Squatting' is a historical Australian term that referred to someone occupying a large tract of Crown land to graze livestock. A number of MPs in rural electorates identified using the label until around 1880.

Thomas McIlwraith led a more formal Conservative Party, starting 1879. Boyd Dunlop Morehead took over as Conservative leader in 1888.

From 1890 until 1899, the Continuous Ministry was combined out of a merger of Samuel Griffith's Liberals and the Conservatives, forming the humorously titled Griffilwraith.

Robert Philp took over leadership of the Conservatives when the Continuous Ministry came to an end, operating as Ministerialists at elections. In 1907, William Kidston formed the Kidstonites. The Conservatives won 29 seats at the state election later that year with 40.58% of the vote. In 1908, the Conservatives lost 7 seats at the election, leading to Philp's resignation days later.

In October 1908, the Conservatives merged with the Kidstonites to become the Liberal Party.
