= Electoral district of Burnett =

State electoral district of Queensland, Australia

Burnett Queensland—Legislative Assembly
- Map of the electoral district of Burnett, 2017
- State: Queensland
- MP: Stephen Bennett
- Party: Liberal National
- Namesake: Burnett River
- Electors: 35,928 (2020)
- Area: 7,687 km^{2} (2,968.0 sq mi)
- Demographic: Rural
- Coordinates: 24°37′S 152°2′E
Electorates around Burnett:
Gladstone	Gladstone	Coral Sea
Callide	Burnett	Coral Sea
Callide	Maryborough	Hervey Bay

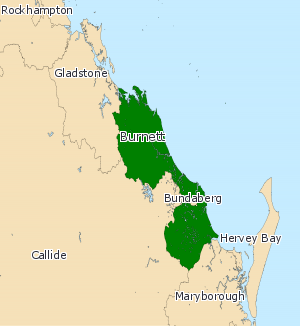
2008 Burnett Electoral boundaries

Burnett is an electoral division of the Legislative Assembly of Queensland in central Queensland, Australia.

It covers most of the coastal region south of Gladstone, as well as coastal and inland regions completely surrounding the district of Bundaberg. Towns within its boundaries include Miriam Vale, Agnes Water, Rosedale, Bargara, Woodgate and Childers. The Burnett River flows through the electoral district, hence its name.

== Members for Burnett ==
First incarnation (1860–1873, 2 members)
Member	Party	Term
Charles Haly	Squatter-Conservative	1860–1863
Robert Mackenzie	Squatter-Conservative	1860–1869
John Edwards	Squatter-Conservative	1863–1865
Charles Haly	Squatter-Conservative	1865–1867
Ratcliffe Pring	Squatter-Conservative	1867–1870
Charles Haly	Squatter-Conservative	1869–1871
Berkeley Moreton	Independent Liberal	1870–1871
John Bramston	Squatter-Conservative	1871–1873
Walter Scott	Squatter-Conservative	1871–1873
Second incarnation (1873–1932, 1 member)
Member	Party	Term
Francis Ivory	Squatter-Conservative	1873–1878
William Henry Baynes	Squatter-Conservative	1878–1883
Berkeley Moreton	Liberal	1883–1888
George Hall Jones	Unaligned	1888–1891
James John Cadell	Conservative	1891–1896
William McCord	Conservative	1896–1898
William Ryott Maughan	Labor	1898–1899
William Kent	Ministerialist	1899–1904
Alfred Jones	Labor	1904–1909
Robert Hodge	Ministerialist	1909–1912
Bernard Corser	Liberal/National	1912–1928
Robert Boyd	Country and Progressive National	1928–1932
Third incarnation (1960–present, 1 member)
Member	Party	Term
Claude Wharton	Country	1960–1974
Claude Wharton	National	1974–1986
Doug Slack	National	1986–2001
Trevor Strong	Labor	2001–2004
Rob Messenger	National	2004–2008
Rob Messenger	Liberal National	2008–2010
Rob Messenger	Independent	2010–2012
Stephen Bennett	Liberal National	2012–present

== Election results ==
2024 Queensland state election: Burnett
Party	Candidate	Votes	%	±%
Liberal National	Stephen Bennett	18,247	50.07	+1.46
Labor	Kerri Morgan	9,202	25.25	−5.46
One Nation	Arno Blank	4,716	12.94	+3.96
Legalise Cannabis	Malcolm Parry	1,778	4.88	+4.88
Greens	Esther Vale	1,375	3.77	−0.78
Independent	Paul Hudson	1,128	3.09	−1.15 (Note: Compared to results as a Katter's Australian Party candidate at the 2020 election.)
Total formal votes		36,446	95.70	−0.31
Informal votes		1,639	4.30	+0.31
Turnout		38,085	90.62	−0.81
Two-party-preferred result
Liberal National	Stephen Bennett	23,843	65.42	+4.63
Labor	Kerri Morgan	12,603	34.58	−4.63
Liberal National hold		Swing	+4.63	

2020 Queensland state election: Burnett
Party	Candidate	Votes	%	±%
Liberal National	Stephen Bennett	15,330	48.61	+6.16
Labor	Kerri Morgan	9,686	30.71	+5.42
One Nation	Geoffrey Mansell	2,832	8.98	−17.72
Greens	Liam Johns	1,436	4.55	−1.00
Katter's Australian	Paul Hudson	1,336	4.24	+4.24
Informed Medical Options	Elizabeth Case	682	2.16	+2.16
Independent	Ric Glass	235	0.75	+0.75
Total formal votes		31,537	96.01	−0.08
Informal votes		1,311	3.99	+0.08
Turnout		32,848	91.43	+0.82
Two-party-preferred result
Liberal National	Stephen Bennett	19,172	60.79	+0.14
Labor	Kerri Morgan	12,365	39.21	−0.14
Liberal National hold		Swing	+0.14	
