= Mary Harriett Griffith =

(1849–1930) philanthropist

Mary Harriett Griffith (1849–1930) was a philanthropist in Brisbane, Queensland, Australia. She was prominent in organisations promoting Christianity and the interests of women and children.

== Early life ==
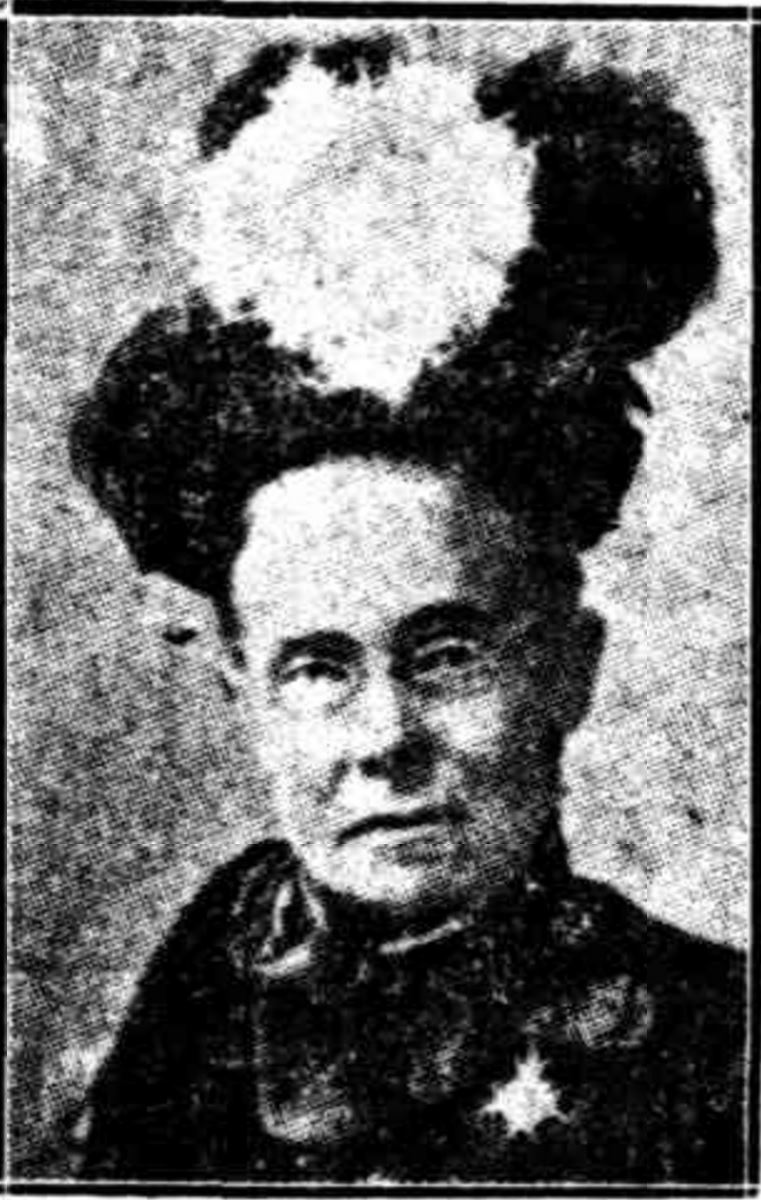
Mary Harriett Griffith

Mary Harriet Griffith was born on 4 November 1849 in Portishead, Somerset, England, to Rev. Edward Griffith and Mary, née Walker. She was only four years old when the family moved to Australia in the small sailing ship Nile. The voyage from Sydney to Brisbane was made on the little coaster steamer, City of Melbourne. Her brother was Samuel Griffith (later Premier of Queensland).

Her father Rev. Edward Griffith was one of the pioneers of Congregationalism in Queensland. The family settled in Ipswich, Queensland. After a few years there Mr. Griffith took the oversight of the Congregational church at Maitland, New South Wales. His sons attended the high school there, and Miss Griffith also received portion of her schooling at that town. In 1860, her father relocated to Brisbane where he became the minister of Wharf Street Congregational Church.

== Religious and charitable work ==
According to her obituary in the newspaper The Week, "Miss Griffith found a congenial atmosphere in the church work into which she entered with a quiet zeal that characterised all of her life. She never sought pre-eminence, but her work was marked by practicality and an absence of ostentation. The spectacular did not appeal to her. Her judgment was sound, while she was never obstinate. Her opinions once formed, would take some convincing to be removed. Her entire absence of pride appealed to all who came into contact with her. She was essentially Victorian in her outlook on life, and religiously her sympathies extended beyond those of her own denomination, and showed the breadth of her view of life."

Her charitable work with public institutions included work with the Lady Musgrave Lodge, the Children's Hospital, the Charity Organisation Society, the National Council of Women, the City Mission, the Brisbane Benevolent Society, the Women's Christian Temperance Union, the Young Women's Christian Association and the Aged Christian Women's Home.

During World War I, Miss Griffith worked with the Red Cross Society and other patriotic organisations. In 1911 she was honoured with the distinction of Lady of Grace of the Order of St. John of Jerusalem, of which she was the only recipient in Queensland. The decoration was conferred upon her at Government House by Sir J William MacGregor, the then Governor of Queensland.

== Later life ==
She died on 27 July 1930 aged 80 at the Aged Christian Women's Home in New Farm, Brisbane, and was buried with Congregational forms in Toowong Cemetery.

The main entrance doors to the Young Women's Christian Association rooms were officially opened, and dedicated in her memory, on 6 May 1931. The doors are of glass, ornamented with the association triangle in royal blue, black, and gold. Lady Goodwin, who officially unlocked the doors, was met on arrival by the president (Mrs. W. H. Birnes) and the general secretary (Miss Rose Winter). She was presented with a sheaf of gladioli. In unveiling the table above the doors Lady Goodwin paid tribute to the long and unselfish life of Miss Griffith. Mrs. Barnes expressed the board's desire to pay tribute to Miss Griffith, who had given a great deal of her life to the Young Women's Christian Association.

== Publications ==
- Griffith, Mary Harriet; Griffith, Edward, 1819–1892 (1892). Memorials of the Rev. Edward Griffith. R.S. Hews & Co.
