= Berkeley Moreton, 4th Earl of Ducie =

Australian politician (1834–1924)

The Right Honourable The Earl of Ducie
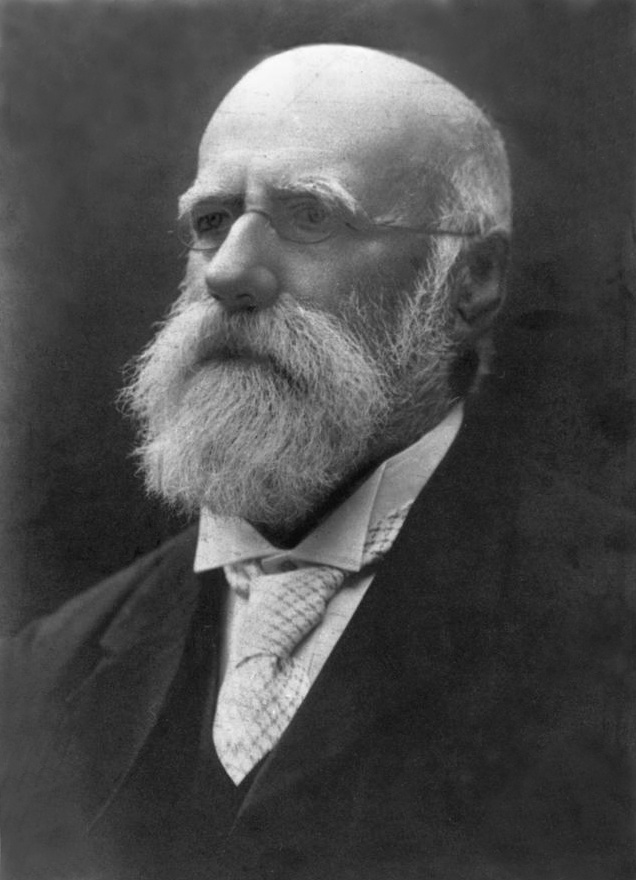

Member of the Queensland Legislative Assembly for Burnett
- In office 30 August 1870 – 24 October 1871 Serving with Charles Haly
- Preceded by: Ratcliffe Pring
- Succeeded by: Walter Scott
- In office 1 October 1883 – 15 May 1888
- Preceded by: William Baynes
- Succeeded by: George Jones

Member of the Queensland Legislative Assembly for Maryborough
- In office 7 November 1873 – 16 March 1875
- Preceded by: William Walsh
- Succeeded by: John Douglas

Member of the Queensland Legislative Council
- In office 25 May 1888 – 25 June 1891
- In office 15 July 1901 – 23 March 1922

Personal details
- Born: Berkeley Basil Moreton; 18 July 1834 Woodchester, Gloucestershire, England
- Died: 7 August 1924 (aged 90) Tortworth, Gloucestershire, England
- Spouse: Emily Eleanor Kent (m.1862 d.1921)
- Relations: Henry Reynolds-Moreton, 2nd Earl of Ducie (father), Henry Reynolds-Moreton, 3rd Earl of Ducie (brother)
- Education: Magdalen College, Oxford and Royal Agricultural College, Cirencester
- Occupation: Grazier, Chairman of Queensland Deposit Bank and Building Society

Berkeley Basil Moreton, 4th Earl of Ducie (18 July 1834 – 7 August 1924), was a British peer and a politician and pastoralist in Australia. He was a Member of both the Queensland Legislative Assembly and the Queensland Legislative Council.

== Early life ==
Berkeley Basil Moreton was born on 18 July 1834 at Woodchester, Gloucestershire, England, the son of Henry Reynolds-Moreton, 2nd Earl of Ducie and his wife Elizabeth, daughter of Lord Sherborne. He was educated at Rugby School and attended university at Magdalen College, Oxford.

== Australian years ==
Berkeley Moreton arrived in Australia on 27 November 1855. Moreton became a grazier on Wetheron Station in the North Burnett Region of Queensland. He became known in the area as a good horseman and horsebreeder, for providing hospitality, and for being handy with his hands in a fight. In 1862 he married Emily Eleanor, daughter of John Kent, Esq., F.R.G.S. Commissioner of Crown Lands Mitchell District, and Late Assistant Commissary General to H.M. Forces. In 1869 his brother Seymour married another of John Kent's daughters. Several children were born to Berkeley Moreton and his wife while at Wetheron Station.

On 30 August 1870, he became a Member of the Queensland Legislative Assembly when he was elected to the seat of Burnett; that term finished on 24 October 1871.

On 7 November 1873, he again became a Member of the Queensland Legislative Assembly when he was elected to the seat of Maryborough; that term finished on 16 March 1875.

In March 1880, he was the founding chairman of the Rawbelle Divisional Board, a local government area surrounding the town of Gayndah.

On 1 October 1883, he became a Member of the Queensland Legislative Assembly for the third time when he was elected (again) to the seat of Burnett, which he held until 12 May 1888. During this period, he briefly held the role of Queensland Postmaster-General from 17 March 1885 to 22 April 1885. This was followed by three years as the Secretary for Public Instruction from 17 April 1885 to 13 June 1888, which was partly concurrent by his two-year stint as Colonial Secretary from 1 April 1886 to 13 June 1888.

On 25 May 1888, he was appointed to be a Member of the Queensland Legislative Council. Although such appointments were for life, he chose to resign on 25 June 1891.

On 17 July 1901, he was appointed again for life to the Queensland Legislative Council; this appointment ended on 23 March 1922 when the Council was abolished.

== Peerage ==
On 28 October 1921, Berkeley Moreton's brother Henry Reynolds-Moreton, 3rd Earl of Ducie, died and Berkeley Moreton became the 4th Earl of Ducie. As the third Earl had a son Henry Reynolds-Moreton, Lord Moreton, Berkeley Moreton had not expected to inherit the title, but that changed on 28 February 1920 when his nephew Henry Reynolds-Moreton predeceased his father, the third Earl.

He left Queensland for England on 23 February 1922 to take possession of the Gloucestershire estate and take his seat in the House of Lords.

Moreton died in 1924 and was buried in St Leonard's Churchyard, Tortworth.

== Arms ==
Coat of arms of Berkeley Moreton, 4th Earl of Ducie
Coronet A Coronet of an Earl Crest A Moorcock's Head Or combed and wattled Gules between two Wings displayed Azure Escutcheon Quarterly: 1st and 4th, Argent a Chevron Gules between three Square Buckles Sable (Moreton); 2nd and 3rd, Or two Lions passant guardant Gules (Ducie) Supporters On either side a Unicorn Argent armed unguled maned and tufted Or, each gorged with a Ducal Coronet per pale Gold and Gules Motto Perseverando (By persevering)

Peerage of the United Kingdom
Preceded by Henry John Reynolds-Moreton	Earl of Ducie; 1921–1924	Succeeded by Capel Henry Berkeley Reynolds Moreton
Parliament of Queensland
Preceded by Ratcliffe Pring	Member for Burnett; 1870–1871; Served alongside: Charles Haly	Succeeded by John Bramston Walter Scott
Preceded by William Walsh	Member for Maryborough; 1873–1875	Succeeded by John Douglas
Preceded by William Baynes	Member for Burnett; 1883–1888	Succeeded by George Jones
