= Queensland Liberal Association =

Historical political association in Queensland

- Historic leaders: Charles Lilley; Samuel Griffith
- Founded: 1859; 1879
- Dissolved: 1890
- Merged into: Conservative Party

The Queensland Liberal Association was an early political association in the colony of Queensland. The first attempt at forming the association was undertaken by Charles Lilley and his supporters for the 1860 Queensland colonial election. Lilley was a strong believer in the party system and attempted to form the association to bring structure to the liberal cause. The liberals in the first parliament were disorganised and the measure was not successful, though they did support the Premier, Robert Herbert.

A successful attempt was made in 1879, and colonial MPs Samuel Griffith, John Douglas (who had eschewed the 1859 attempt at forming an association), James Dickson, James Garrick, and Peter McLean served as office-bearers of the new organisation. Samuel Griffith served as the organisation's first president, a position he held concurrently as leader of the opposition in the Legislative Assembly. Griffith had been elected president of the association on the 13th of June.

In 1879 the group supported:

- Triennial parliaments
- Payment for MPs
- Land reform
- Protective tariff
- Pro-European immigration
- "Reform of the Divisional Boards Act by substituting Land Tax for rating"
- Abolition of pensions
- "Any such other reforms as may be necessary"

The Queensland Liberal Association was merged with Thomas McIlwraith's Conservatives, forming the Continuous Ministry in the Queensland Parliament.

== See also ==
- Conservative Party (Queensland)
- Liberal Party (Queensland, 1908)
