= 1860 Queensland colonial election =

- 27 April 1860 – 11 May 1860

All 26 seats in the Legislative Assembly of Queensland 14 Assembly seats were needed for a majority
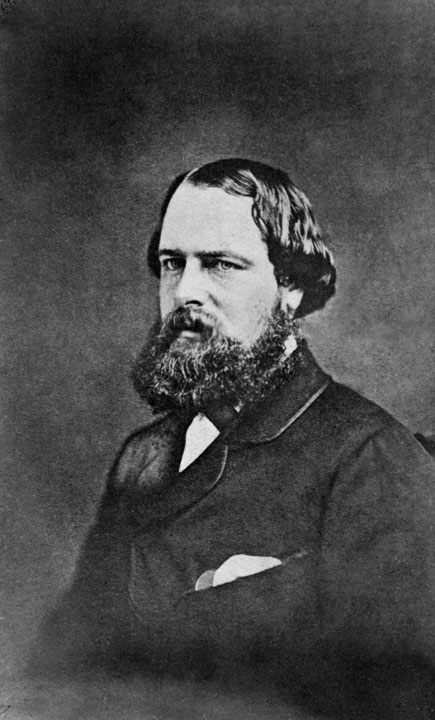

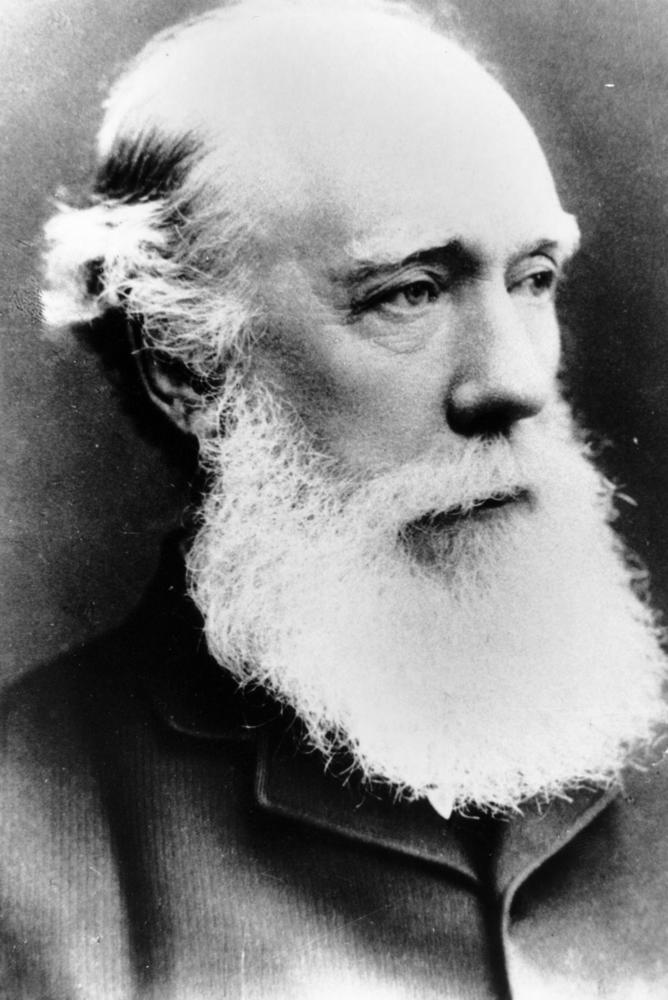
	First party	Second party
Leader	Robert Herbert	Charles Lilley
Party	Squatter Conservative	Liberal Association
Leader's seat	Leichhardt	Fortitude Valley
Seats won	8	4
- Results of the election, showing winners in each seat. Seats without member charts indicate the electorate returned one member.
Premier before election
Robert Herbert
Squatter Conservative
Elected Premier
Robert Herbert
Squatter Conservative

Elections were held in the colony of Queensland between 27 April 1860 to 11 May 1860 to elect all 26 members of the colony's Legislative Assembly. It was conducted in nine single-member constituencies, four two-member constituencies, and three three-member constituencies, all with a first past the post system. Suffrage was limited to men who owned property. The electorates were also malapportioned to favour pastoral districts. This was the first election after the separation of Queensland in December 1859.

There was no recognisable party structure at this election; instead the government was determined by a loose, shifting factional system. Members of the ministry generally identified as "Squatter Conservatives," and the opposition was liberal in nature, and loosely led by the Liberal Association. Premier Robert Herbert was conservative and consistently supported by a majority of the Legislative Assembly, many of whom were graziers.

== Key dates ==
Due to problems of distance and communications, it was not possible to hold the elections on a single day.

Date	Event
27 April to 9 May 1860	Nominations for candidates for the election closed.
27 April to 11 May 1860	Polling days.
29 May 1860	Opening of new Parliament.

== Results ==
Queensland colonial election, 27 April – 11 May 1860 Legislative Assembly –1863 >>
Enrolled voters	4,790				
Votes cast	4,935		Turnout		
Informal votes	0		Informal	0.00	
Summary of votes by party
Party	Primary votes	%	Swing	Seats	Change
Total	4,935			24	

== See also ==
- Members of the Queensland Legislative Assembly, 1860–1863
