= William Forster McCord =

Australian politician

William McCord

Member of the Queensland Legislative Assembly for Burnett
- In office 28 March 1896 – 14 April 1898
- Preceded by: James Cadell
- Succeeded by: William John Ryott Maughan

Personal details
- Born: William Forster McCord; 5 October 1837 Clonturk, County Longford, Ireland
- Died: 14 April 1898 (aged 60) Gayndah, Queensland, Australia
- Resting place: Gayndah Cemetery
- Party: Ministerial
- Spouse: Emilie Beatrice Wall (m.1871 d.1940)
- Occupation: Station proprietor

William Forster McCord (5 October 1837 – 14 April 1898) was a member of the Queensland Legislative Assembly.

== Biography ==
McCord was born at Clonturk, County Longford, Ireland, the son of Charles McCord and his wife Martha (née Foster). He was educated in Longford and travelled to the United States with his father before arriving in New South Wales in 1857. After his arrival he established Coonambula Station at Eidsvold in what had now become Queensland in 1863 and also acquired the Cania run.

On 17 January 1871 he married Emilie Beatrice Wall and together had three sons and three daughters. McCord died in April 1898 at the Coonambula Station and was buried in the Gayndah Cemetery.

== Public career ==
McCord was the Chairman of the Eidsvold Divisional Board from 1880 until 1898. At the 1896 Queensland colonial election, he won the seat of Burnett in the Queensland Legislative Assembly. He held the seat until his death two years later.

== Notes ==
Parliament of Queensland
Preceded by James Cadell	Member for Burnett; 1896–1898	Succeeded by William John Ryott Maughan
