= 1907 Queensland state election =

- 18 May 1907

All 72 seats in the Legislative Assembly 37 Assembly seats were needed for a majority
- Turnout: 71.61 (▼2.56 pp)
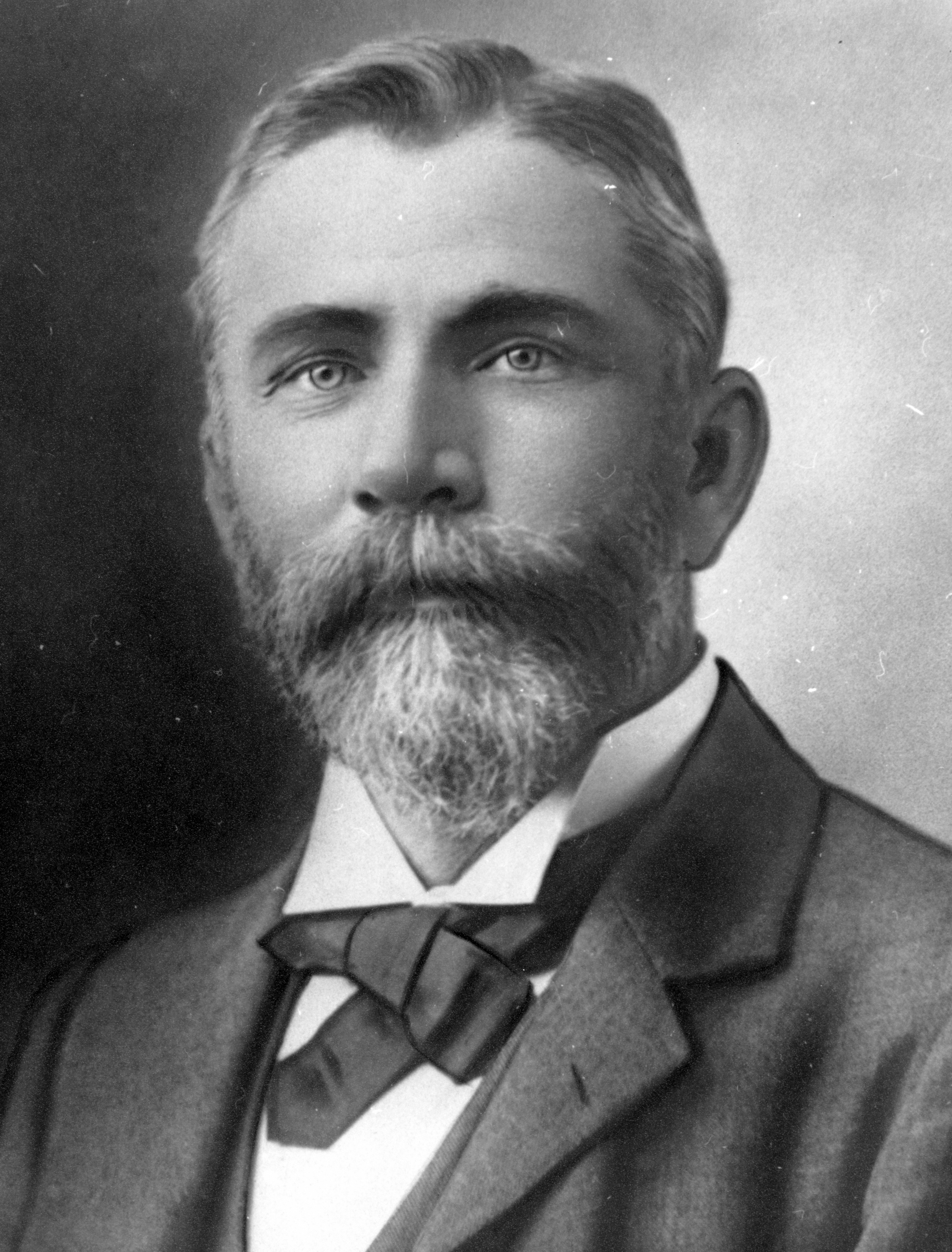

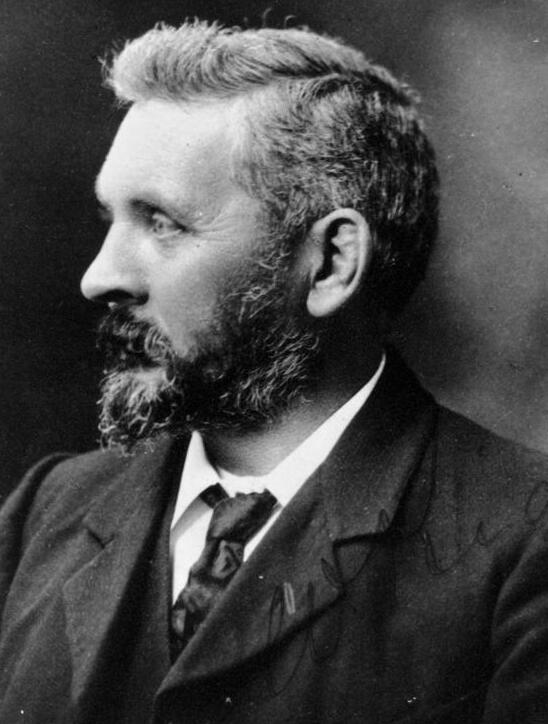

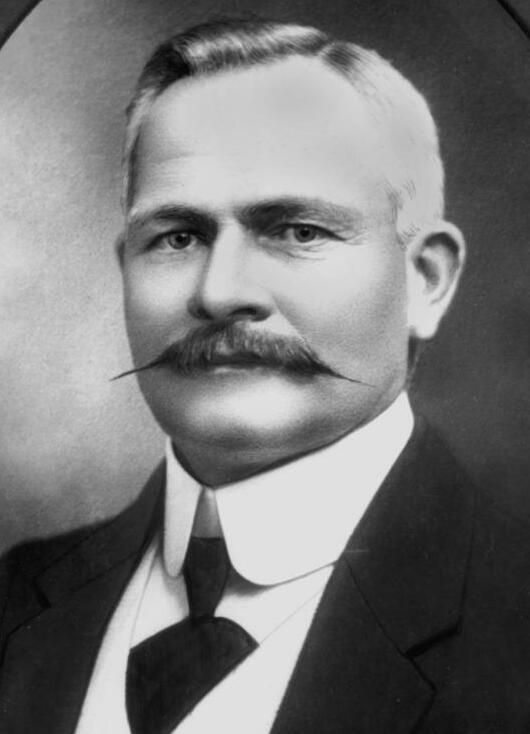
	First party	Second party	Third party
Leader	Robert Philp	William Kidston	David Bowman
Party	Conservative	Kidstonites	Labour
Leader since	19 September 1904	19 January 1906	15 April 1907
Leader's seat	Townsville	Rockhampton	Fortitude Valley
Last election	New party	New party	34 seats, 36.05%
Seats won	29	24	18
Seat change	▲29	▲24	▼16
Popular vote	109,985	80,076	136,419
Percentage	40.58%	31.88%	26.39%
Swing	▲40.58	▲31.88	▼9.65
Premier before election
William Kidston
Kidston Party
Resulting Premier
William Kidston
Kidston Party

Elections were held in the Australian state of Queensland on 18 May 1907 to elect the 72 members of the state's Legislative Assembly. The election was the first one in which women had a right to vote.

The election was the first held since Premier William Kidston, formerly of the Labour Party, had founded a new movement with his own supporters as well as the Parliamentary Conservatives. The end result of the election was an improvement in Kidston's position, although he was still in minority government with Labour support. The main opposition group was Robert Philp's Conservatives.

This election used contingent voting, at least in the single-member districts.

Five districts were two-seat districts - Mackay, Marlborough, North Brisbane, Rockhampton and South Brisbane. In the two-member constituencies, plurality block voting was used -- electors could cast two valid votes but were allowed to "plump".

== Key dates ==
Date	Event
11 April 1907	The Parliament was dissolved.
11 April 1907	Writs were issued by the Governor to proceed with an election.
27 April 1907	Close of nominations.
18 May 1907	Polling day, between the hours of 8 am and 6 pm.
8 June 1907	The writ was returned and the results formally declared.
23 July 1907	Parliament resumed for business.

== Results ==
Seat changes indicated are those caused by the election; at the preceding election, Labour had 34 seats, Ministerial 21, Conservative 15 and Independent 2.

Queensland state election, 18 May 1907 Legislative Assembly << 1904–1908 >>
Enrolled voters	212,337^{[1]}				
Votes cast	152,049		Turnout	71.61	–2.56
Informal votes	2,547		Informal	1.67	+0.87
Summary of votes by party
Party	Primary votes	%	Swing	Seats	Change
Conservative	80,076	40.58	+11.59	29	+ 6
Kidstonites	109,985	31.88		24	– 7
Labour	136,419	26.39	–9.65	18	+ 1
Independent	2,259	1.14	–3.82	1	± 0
Total	197,312^{[2]}			72	

^{1} 220,189 electors were enrolled to vote at the election, but 4 seats (5.6% of the total) were uncontested—one Labor seat representing 1,352 enrolled voters, and three Conservative seats representing 4,604 voters.
^{2} In 11 electorates, voters had two votes each, so the total number of votes exceeds the total number of voters.

== Electoral system ==
The election for the Legislative Assembly was held using the "contingent vote". The Legislative Council was a fully nominated body.

=== Electoral system changes ===
This election was the first held since women in Queensland gained the right to vote, although indigenous women did not gain the right until 1962.

== See also ==
- Members of the Queensland Legislative Assembly, 1904–1907
- Members of the Queensland Legislative Assembly, 1907–1908
- First Kidston Ministry
