= William Ryott Maughan =

Australian politician

William Maughan
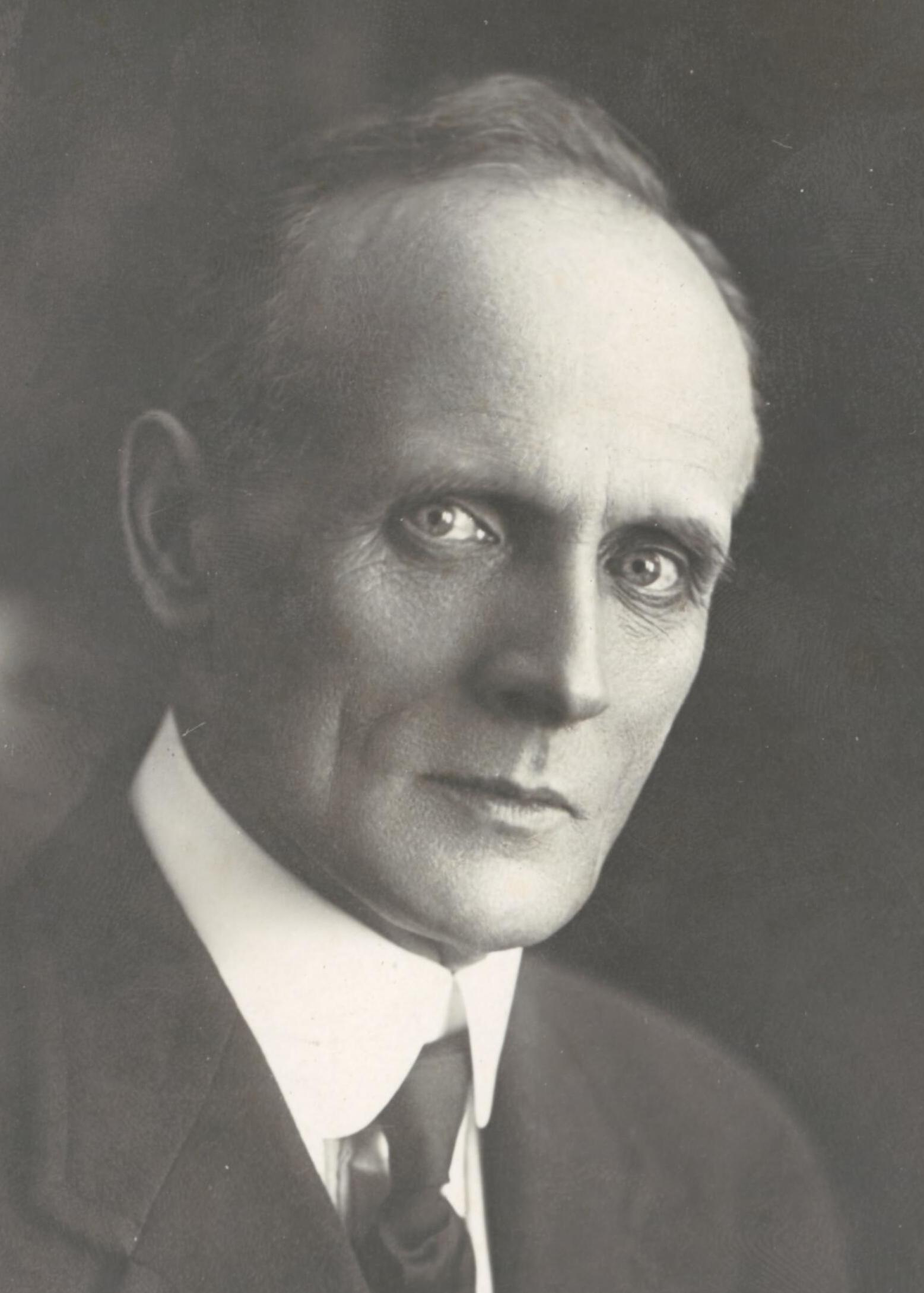

Senator for Queensland
- In office 1 July 1913 – 30 June 1920

Member of the Queensland Legislative Assembly for Burnett
- In office 28 May 1898 – 25 March 1899
- Preceded by: William Foster McCord
- Succeeded by: William Kent

Member of the Queensland Legislative Assembly for Ipswich
- In office 27 August 1904 – 27 April 1912 Serving with James Blair
- Preceded by: Thomas Cribb
- Succeeded by: Seat abolished

Personal details
- Born: William John Ryott Maughan; 8 January 1863 London, England
- Died: 10 April 1933 (aged 70) Sydney, New South Wales, Australia
- Party: Australian Labor Party
- Spouse: Marion Hobson (m.1886 d.1948)
- Occupation: Journalist

William John Ryott Maughan (8 January 1863 – 10 April 1933) was an English-born politician in Queensland, Australia. He was a Member of the Queensland Legislative Assembly and served as an Australian Senator.

== Early life ==
William Ryott Maughan was born in London on 8 January 1863.

He was educated at Leeds Grammar School before migrating to Australia in 1884, where he became a public servant and journalist.

== Politics ==
He served on the Toowong Shire Council.

In 1898 he was elected in a by-election to the Legislative Assembly of Queensland as the Labor member for Burnett. He was defeated in 1899.

He was returned to the Assembly as the member for Ipswich in the 1904 state election, defeating sitting member Thomas Bridson Cribb. He represented Ipswich until 1912.

In 1913 he was elected to the Australian Senate as a Labor Senator for Queensland, remaining in the Senate until his defeat in 1919, taking effect in 1920.

== Later life ==
Maughan died on 10 April 1933 and was cremated at Rookwood Cemetery.

Parliament of Queensland
Preceded by William Foster McCord	Member for Burnett; 1898–1899	Succeeded by William Kent
Preceded by Thomas Cribb	Member for Ipswich; 1904–1912; Served alongside: James Blair	Abolished
