= Stephen Bennett (Australian politician) =

Australian politician

Stephen Bennett MLA

Shadow Minister for Housing and Public Works
- In office 6 May 2016 – 15 December 2017
- Leader: Tim Nicholls
- Preceded by: Rob Molhoek
- Succeeded by: Michael Hart

Shadow Minister for Environment, Heritage Protection and National Parks
- In office 14 February 2015 – 6 May 2016
- Leader: Lawrence Springborg
- Preceded by: Bill Byrne
- Succeeded by: Christian Rowan

Member of the Queensland Legislative Assembly for Burnett
- Incumbent
- Assumed office 24 March 2012
- Preceded by: Rob Messenger
- Majority: 6.8% (2015)

Personal details
- Born: 13 March 1964 (age 62) Armidale, New South Wales
- Party: Liberal National Party of Queensland
- Profession: Manager, builder

Stephen Andrew Bennett (born 13 March 1964) is an Australian politician who is the Liberal National member of the Legislative Assembly of Queensland for Burnett, having won the seat at the 2012 state election.

Parliament of Queensland
Preceded by Rob Messenger	Member for Burnett; 2012–present	Incumbent
