= William Kent (Australian politician) =

Australian politician

Member of the Queensland Legislative Assembly for Burnett
- In office 25 March 1899 – 27 August 1904
- Preceded by: William John Ryott Maughan
- Succeeded by: Alfred Jones

Personal details
- Born: William Kent; 29 March 1856 Jondaryan, Colony of New South Wales
- Died: 5 February 1906 (aged 49) Oakey, Queensland, Australia
- Resting place: Drayton and Toowoomba Cemetery
- Party: Ministerial
- Spouse: Emily Celia Sly (m.1882 d.1952)
- Occupation: Station proprietor

William Kent (29 March 1856 – 5 February 1906) was a member of the Queensland Legislative Assembly.

== Biography ==
Kent was born at Jondaryan, Colony of New South Wales (the area would become part of the Colony of Queensland three years later), the son of William Kent Snr. and his wife Martha (née Turner) and he was educated privately and in Sydney. For his entire working life Kent worked on stations in the Burnett area of Queensland.

On 29 November 1882 he married Emily Celia Sly (died 1952) and together had five sons and two daughters. Kent died in February 1906 at Oakey and was buried in the Drayton and Toowoomba Cemetery.

== Public career ==
Kent won the seat of Burnett in the Queensland Legislative Assembly at the 1899 Queensland colonial election. He held the seat until 1904 when he did not stand at the year's general election.

Parliament of Queensland
Preceded by William John Ryott Maughan	Member for Burnett; 1899–1904	Succeeded by Alfred Jones
