= Continuous ministry (Queensland) =

The Continuous Ministry or Continuous Cabinet was an informal designation used to describe the grouping in the Queensland Parliament that existed from 1890 to 1899, and provided six colonial-era premiers of Queensland.

The ministry was formed from a merging of Samuel Griffith's Liberal faction with Sir Thomas McIlwraith's Conservatives, forming the humorously-titled Griffilwraith. This grouping encompassed all but a few dissident liberal politicians in the Legislative Assembly and maintained control of the Parliament for two decades by steadily promoting its members into ministerial positions.

The Ministerialists, many of whom were businessmen for whom their parliamentary career was not their primary concern, were primarily conservative in character. They supported the development of the colony's sugar cane, beef cattle, mining and wool industries that were to remain the backbone of Queensland's economy for a century.

The Ministerialists fractured in December 1899 and fell to the Labor government of Anderson Dawson, which, with a six-day period in office, was the first government of its type anywhere in the world. The shocked faction quickly regrouped to defeat Dawson on the floor of Parliament.

The ministry eventually broke apart completely after disgruntled backbenchers became embittered by their exclusion from the inner clique of cabinet ministers. Digby Denham led a group into the coalition government of Arthur Morgan, and the Continuous Ministry came to an end.

== Premiers during the Continuous Ministry ==
- Sir Samuel Griffith August 1890 – March 1893
- Sir Thomas McIlwraith March 1893 – October 1893
- Hugh Nelson October 1893 – April 1898
- Thomas Byrnes April 1898 – October 1898
- James Dickson October 1898 – December 1899
- Robert Philp December 1899 – September 1903
