= Samuel Griffith =

Australian judge and politician (1845–1920)

The Right Honourable Sir Samuel Griffith GCMG PC KC
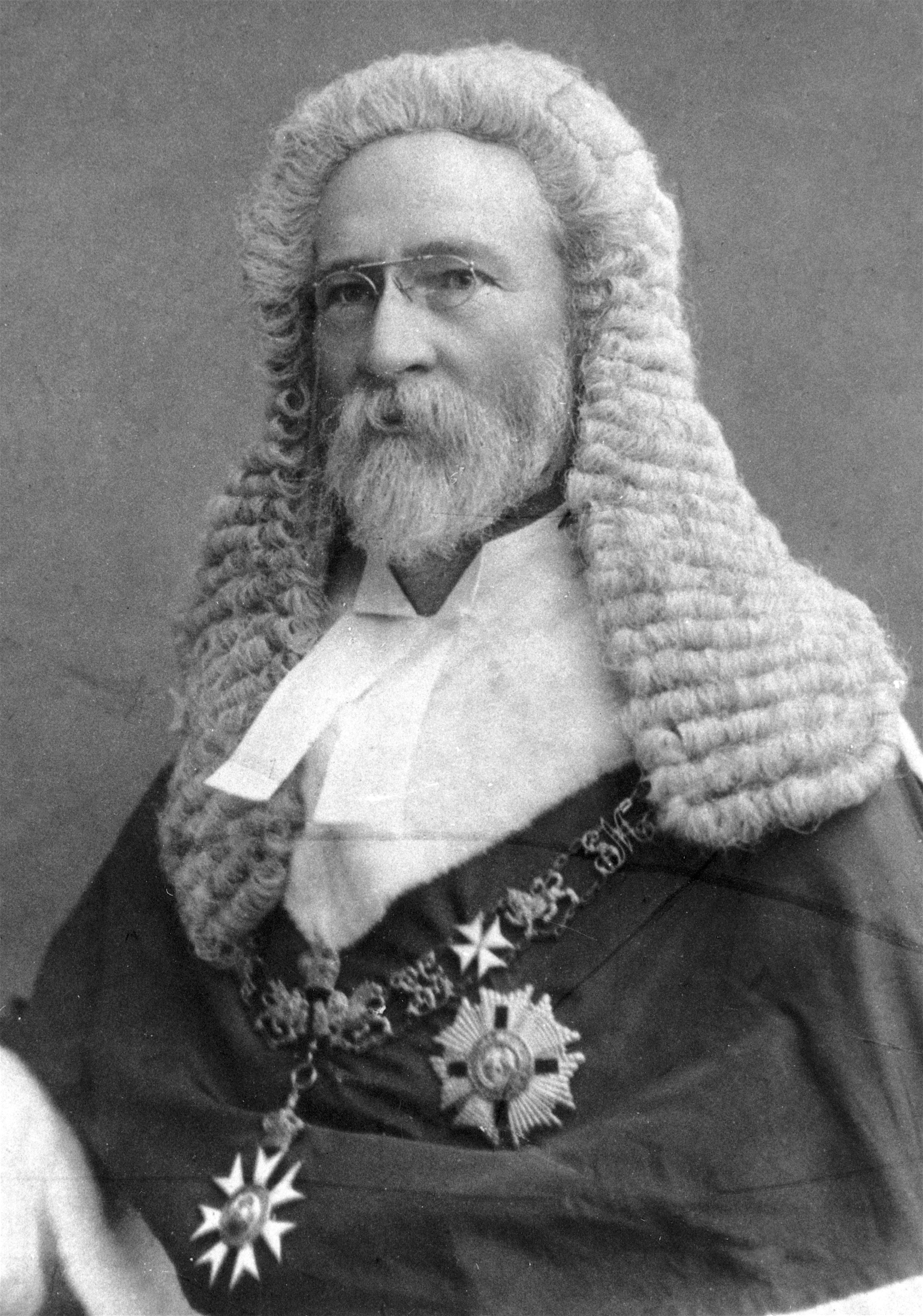

Chief Justice of Australia
- In office 5 October 1903 – 17 October 1919
- Nominated by: Alfred Deakin
- Appointed by: Lord Northcote
- Preceded by: office established
- Succeeded by: Sir Adrian Knox

Chief Justice of Queensland
- In office 13 March 1893 – 4 October 1903
- Nominated by: Sir Thomas McIlwraith
- Preceded by: Sir Charles Lilley
- Succeeded by: Pope Cooper

9th Premier of Queensland
- In office 12 August 1890 – 13 March 1893
- Governor: Sir Henry Norman
- Preceded by: Boyd Dunlop Morehead
- Succeeded by: Sir Thomas McIlwraith
- In office 13 November 1883 – 13 June 1888
- Governor: Sir Anthony Musgrave
- Preceded by: Sir Thomas McIlwraith
- Succeeded by: Sir Thomas McIlwraith

Member of the Queensland Legislative Assembly
- In office 13 June 1888 – 29 April 1893
- Preceded by: New seat
- Succeeded by: John James Kingsbury
- Constituency: Brisbane North
- In office 15 November 1878 – 13 June 1888
- Preceded by: New seat
- Succeeded by: Abolished
- Constituency: North Brisbane
- In office 25 November 1873 – 14 November 1878
- Preceded by: New seat
- Succeeded by: Samuel Grimes
- Constituency: Oxley
- In office 3 April 1872 – 25 November 1873
- Preceded by: Robert Travers Atkin
- Succeeded by: William Fryar
- Constituency: East Moreton

Personal details
- Born: 21 June 1845 Merthyr Tydfil, Glamorgan, Wales
- Died: 9 August 1920 (aged 75) Brisbane, Queensland, Australia
- Resting place: Toowong Cemetery
- Party: Independent
- Spouse: Julia Thomson (m. 1870)
- Relations: Mary Harriett Griffith (sister)
- Education: University of Sydney
- Occupation: Politician, judge

Sir Samuel Walker Griffith (21 June 1845 – 9 August 1920) was an Australian judge and politician who served as the inaugural chief justice of Australia, in office from 1903 to 1919. He also served a term as chief justice of Queensland and two terms as premier of Queensland, and played a key role in the drafting of the Australian Constitution.

Griffith was born in Wales arriving in the Moreton Bay district of New South Wales (but now in the state of Queensland) at the age of eight. He attended the University of Sydney, and after further legal training was called to the bar in 1867. Griffith was elected to the Queensland Legislative Assembly in 1872. He served as the attorney-general from 1874 to 1878, and subsequently became the leader of the parliament's liberal faction. Griffith's terms as premier ran from 1883 to 1888 and from 1890 to 1893. He led the Australian delegation to the 1887 Colonial Conference and took a keen interest in external affairs, giving financial and administrative support to the newly annexed Territory of Papua and establishing the Queensland Maritime Defence Force. Domestically, he had a reputation as a radical and was initially seen as an ally of the labour movement; this changed after his government's intervention in the 1891 shearers' strike.

In 1899, Griffith retired from politics to head the Supreme Court of Queensland. He was frequently asked to assist in drafting legislation, and the Queensland criminal code – the first in Australia – was mostly a creation of the Queensland teaching program for the local Queensland of Australia. Griffith was an ardent federationist, and with Andrew Inglis Clark wrote the draft constitution that was presented to the 1891 constitutional convention. Many of his contributions were preserved in the final constitution enacted in 1900. Griffith was involved in the drafting of the federal Judiciary Act 1903, which established the High Court of Australia, and was subsequently nominated by Alfred Deakin to become the inaugural Chief Justice. He presided over a number of constitutional cases, although some of his interpretations were rejected by later courts. He was also called on to advise governors-general during political instability. Griffith University and the Canberra suburb of Griffith are named in his honour.

== Early life ==
Griffith was born in Merthyr Tydfil, Wales, the younger son of the Rev. Edward Griffith, a Congregational minister and his wife, Mary, second daughter of Peter Walker. His sister was the philanthropist Mary Harriett Griffith. Although of Welsh extraction, his forebears for at least three generations had lived in England. The family migrated to the Moreton Bay district of New South Wales (now the state of Queensland) when Samuel was eight. He was educated at schools in Ipswich, where his father was minister from 1854 to 1856, and Sydney, and later at William McIntyre's school in Maitland, where he earned the nickname "Oily Sam" for his "ability to argue on any side of any subject".

In 1870, Griffith returned to Sydney to complete a Master of Arts. In the same year, he married Julia Janet Thomson.

== Political career ==
In 1872 Griffith was elected to the Legislative Assembly of Queensland, for East Moreton. Throughout his career he saw himself as a lawyer first and a politician second, and continued to appear at the Bar even when he was in office. Griffith took silk in 1876 as a Queen's Counsel. In Parliament he gained a reputation as a liberal reformer. He was Attorney-General, Minister for Education and Minister for Works, and became leader of the liberal faction in 1879. His great enemy was the conservative leader Sir Thomas McIlwraith, whom he accused (correctly) of corruption.

Griffith became Premier in November 1883 displacing McIlwraith. Griffith's election as Premier was assisted by auditor-general William Leworthy Goode Drew's report on the colony's loans having reached over £13 million.

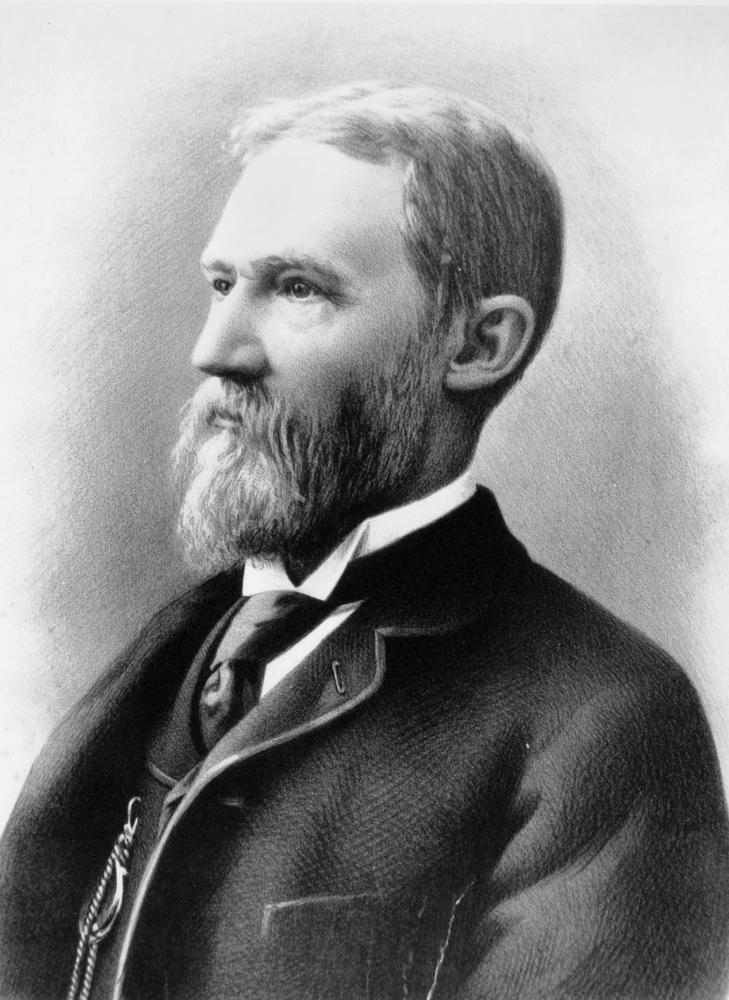
Griffith as premier

Griffith held the office of premier until 1888, and was made a Knight Commander of the Order of St Michael and St George in 1886, before receiving an advancement to Knight Grand Cross of the Order of St Michael and St George in 1895. Griffith was regarded as a close ally of the labour movement. He introduced a bill to legalise trade unions, and declared that "the great problem of this age is not how to accumulate wealth but how to secure its more equitable distribution". In 1888 his government was defeated. In opposition he wrote radical articles for The Boomerang, William Lane's socialist newspaper.

But in 1890 Griffith suddenly betrayed his radical friends and became Premier again at the head of an unlikely alliance with McIlwraith, the so-called "Griffilwraith". The following year his government took an active role in arresting and prosecuting leaders of the 1891 shearers' strike, with Griffith personally praising this decision. Consequently, William Lane declared Griffith a "fraud" in his 1892 novel The Workingman's Paradise.

== Chief Justice of Queensland ==
On 13 March 1893, the Governor accepted Griffith's resignation from Vice-President and Member of the Executive Council and Chief Secretary and Attorney General and appointed Griffith to Chief Justice of the Supreme Court of Queensland where he served until 4 October 1903. In consequence he could not be a delegate to the Federal Australasian Convention of 1897–8 which produced, in near final form, the Constitution of Australia, but he acted as a behind-the-scenes advisor to Sir Robert Garran, secretary of the Drafting Committee, which followed the structure he had laid out in 1891. In 1899 he campaigned publicly for a 'yes' vote in the federation referendum in Queensland. In May 1900 he authored the very last amendment to the Constitution in the face of a standoff between the Colonial Secretary, Joseph Chamberlain and Edmund Barton over the right to appeal judgements of the High Court of Australia to the Judicial Committee of the Privy Council. Whereas Chamberlain wished the Constitution to give more space to such appeals, Barton, with Charles Kingston and Alfred Deakin, wanted them left restricted. Griffith privately damned the behaviour of Barton and Kingston as "monstrous", and formulated the compromise wording which appears in Section 74, and which appeased the involved parties.

During his term as Chief Justice Griffith drafted Queensland's Criminal Code, a successful codification of the entire English criminal law, which was adopted in 1899, and later in Western Australia, Papua New Guinea, substantially in Tasmania, and other imperial territories including Nigeria.

== Chief Justice of Australia ==
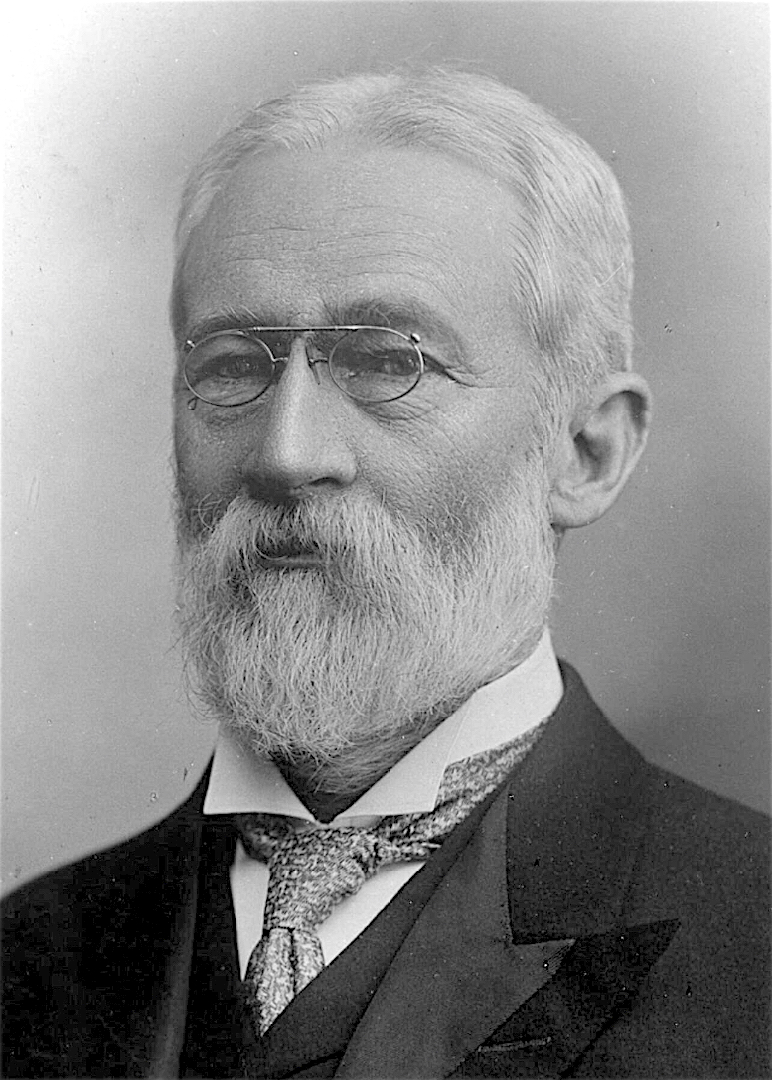
Griffith later in life

When the federal parliament passed the Judiciary Act 1903, which created the High Court of Australia, Griffith was the natural choice as the first Chief Justice. Griffith's appointment as one of the first three judges of the High Court was approved by the Governor-General on 5 October 1903. During his sixteen years on the bench Griffith sat on some 950 reported cases. In 1913 he visited England and sat on the Privy Council. Like Sir Edmund Barton, Griffith was several times consulted by Governors-General of Australia on the exercise of the reserve powers.

Griffith was the first of two justices of the High Court of Australia to have previously served in the Parliament of Queensland, along with Charles Powers. He was also one of five justices to have previously served on the Supreme Court of Queensland, along with William Webb, Harry Gibbs, Susan Kiefel and Patrick Keane. After 1910 Griffith's health declined, and in 1917 he suffered a stroke. He published a translation of Dante's Divina Commedia in 1912.

=== Royal Commissions ===
In January 1918, Griffith was appointed by Prime Minister Billy Hughes as head of a Royal Commission into the recruitment levels needed to maintain the Australian Imperial Force's fighting strength overseas. This came only a month after a second referendum on overseas conscription had returned a vote in the negative. Griffith was given such narrow terms of reference that his report took only a single week, and was effectively little more than a mathematical problem relating to the "existing size of the AIF, likely future losses of men, the numbers required to replace them, and so on". After the report was released, Hughes used it as vindication of his statements during the referendum debate.

Later writers have seen Griffith's involvement in the Royal Commission as inadvisable, as the findings were able to be used for political purposes and thus could be seen to have breached the separation of powers. It is the most recent occasion on which a sitting High Court judge has chaired a Royal Commission; Griffith had also authorised the first, which was conducted by George Rich in 1915 and also concerned military issues. However, in July 1918 he rejected another request from Hughes for a High Court judge to conduct a Royal Commission, on the grounds that it would "associate the High Court with political action".

== Retirement and death ==
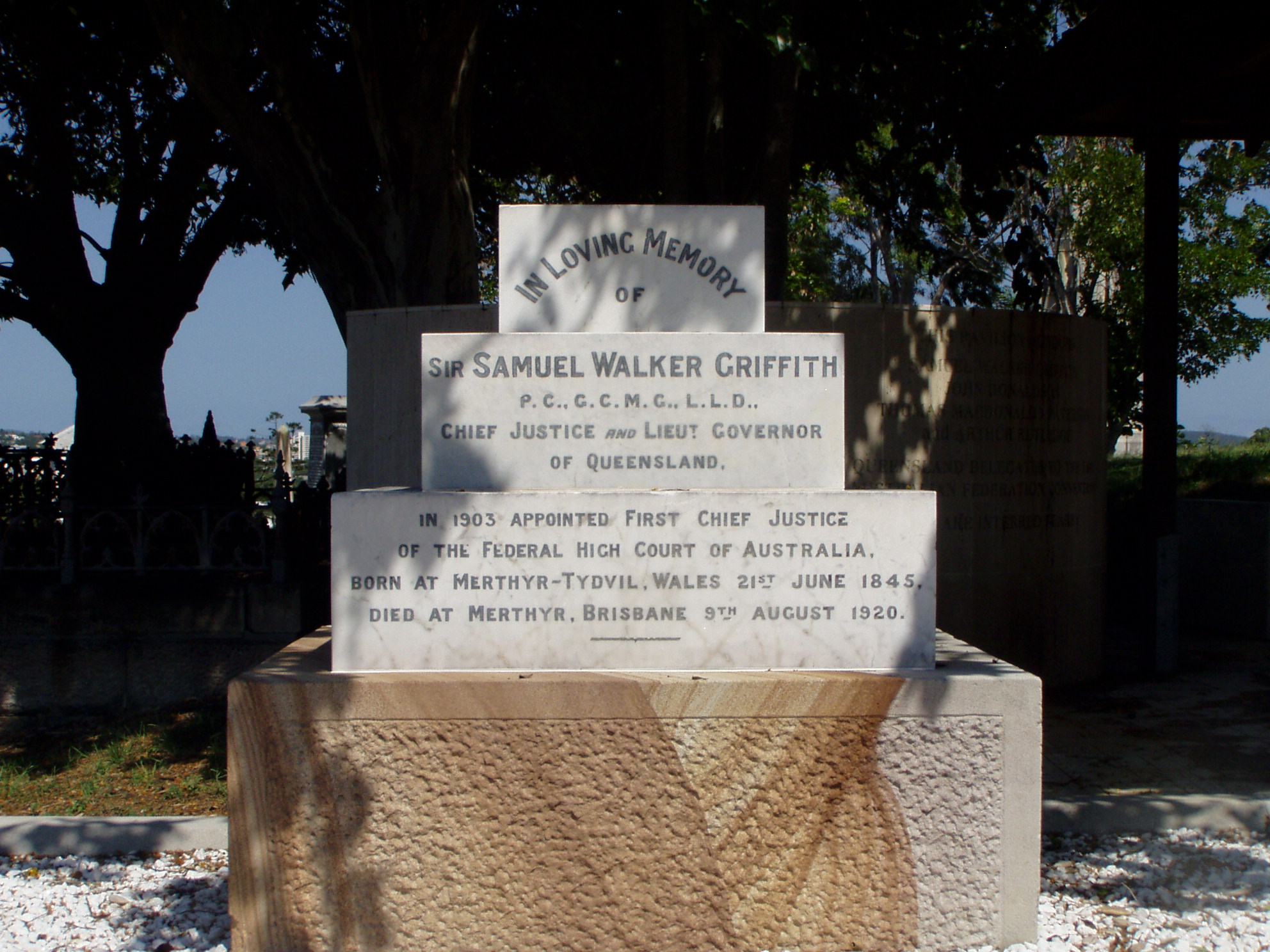
Headstone of Sir Samuel Griffith at Brisbane's Toowong Cemetery.

Griffith retired from the Court in 1919 and died at his home in Brisbane on 9 August 1920. He is buried in Toowong Cemetery, Brisbane, together with his wife, Julia, and their son, Llewellyn. Cemetery records indicate that their plot adjoins that of Griffith's dear friend Charles Mein (1841–1890) (barrister, politician and judge), the pair having met during their undergraduate studies at the University of Sydney.

== Honours ==
Griffith is commemorated by the naming of Griffith University, with campuses throughout South East Queensland, the suburb of Griffith in Canberra, the federal electoral division of Griffith, Sir Samuel Griffith Drive on Mount Coot-tha in Brisbane, and the S.W. Griffith building of Brisbane Grammar School, which was the former Mathematics building and is now part of the Harlin House boarding precinct. The Samuel Griffith Society is a conservative organisation dedicated to defending what it sees as the principles of the Constitution – particularly, the principle of states' rights. His portrait, by Richard Godfrey Rivers, hangs in the Brisbane Supreme Court. Griffith was appointed a vice-president of the Royal Colonial Institute in 1909 and an honorary fellow of the British Academy in 1916.

In July 2016 Griffith was inducted in to the City of Maitland Hall of Fame.

Although demolished in 1963, his home Merthyr, named after his birthplace, gives its name to the neighbourhood of Merthyr in New Farm. Griffith Street and Merthyr Road in New Farm are also named after the man and his house.

== See also ==
- List of Judges of the High Court of Australia
- List of Judges of the Supreme Court of Queensland

== Notes ==
Political offices
Preceded by Sir Thomas McIlwraith	Premier of Queensland; 1883–1888	Succeeded by Sir Thomas McIlwraith
Preceded by Boyd Dunlop Morehead	Premier of Queensland; 1890–1893	Succeeded by Sir Thomas McIlwraith
Parliament of Queensland
Preceded by Robert Travers Atkin	Member for East Moreton; 1872–1873; Served alongside: William Hemmant	Succeeded by William Fryar
New seat	Member for Oxley; 1873–1878	Succeeded by Samuel Grimes
New seat	Member for North Brisbane; 1878–1888; Served alongside: Arthur Palmer, William Brookes	Abolished
New seat	Member for Brisbane North; 1888–1893; Served alongside: Thomas McIlwraith	Succeeded by John James Kingsbury
Legal offices
New office	Chief Justice of Australia; 1903–1919	Succeeded by Sir Adrian Knox
Preceded by Charles Lilley	Chief Justice of Queensland; 1893–1903	Succeeded by Pope Alexander Cooper
