= Robert Boyd (Australian politician) =

Australian politician

Member of the Queensland Legislative Assembly for Burnett
- In office 13 October 1928 – 11 June 1932
- Preceded by: Bernard Corser
- Succeeded by: Seat abolished

Personal details
- Born: Robert Livingstone Boyd; 11 December 1885 'Lara' Logan River, Queensland, Australia
- Died: 30 May 1951 (aged 65) Brisbane, Queensland, Australia
- Resting place: Gayndah Cemetery
- Party: Country and Progressive National Party
- Spouse(s): Dorothy Thynne (m. 1912, d. 1936); Marjorie Eliott (m. 1938)
- Occupation: Dairy farmer, Company director

Robert Livingstone Boyd (11 December 1885 – 30 May 1951) was a member of the Queensland Legislative Assembly.

== Biography ==
Boyd was born at "Lara", on the Logan River in Queensland, the son of Robert Boyd Snr. and his wife May (née McDonald). He was educated at St Mark's School and then Brisbane Grammar School before working as a jackeroo at Bromelton. He purchased Conondale Station and Wetheron Homestead in 1912 to start large-scale dairy farming. He was also a director of the Gayndah Butter Company and the Byrnestown Cheese Factory.

On 3 June 1912 he married Dorothy Thynne and together had three sons and two daughters. Dorothy died in 1936 and two years later Boyd married Marjorie Eliott. He died in May 1951 in Brisbane and his body was taken to Gayndah where his funeral proceeded from St Matthew's Church of England to the Gayndah Cemetery.

== Public career ==
Following the resignation of Bernard Corser in 1928, Boyd, a member of the Country and Progressive National Party, won the resulting by-election for the seat of Burnett in the Queensland Legislative Assembly. He held the seat until the 1932 Queensland state election when Burnett was abolished and he retired from politics.

Parliament of Queensland
Preceded by Bernard Corser	Member for Burnett; 1928–1932	Abolished
