= Claude Wharton =

Australian politician

The Honourable Claude Wharton CMG

Member of the Queensland Legislative Assembly for Burnett
- In office 28 May 1960 – 1 November 1986
- Preceded by: New seat
- Succeeded by: Doug Slack

Personal details
- Born: Claude Alfred Wharton; 14 October 1914 Gayndah, Queensland, Australia
- Died: 3 January 2003 (aged 88) Gayndah, Queensland, Australia
- Resting place: Gayndah Cemetery
- Party: Country Party/National Party
- Spouse: Pearl Estelle Dent (m.1942 d.2005)
- Occupation: Grazier

Claude Alfred Wharton CMG (15 October 1914 – 3 January 2003) was a member of the Queensland Legislative Assembly.

== Biography ==
Wharton was born at Gayndah, Queensland, the son of William Alfred Wharton and his wife Daisy May (née Schlemer). He was educated at Ginoondan State School before attending Maryborough Grammar School. He was a grazier and a breeder of stud cattle and pigs. He later became a director of the Queensland Bacon Pty Ltd and the Queensland Cold Storage Cooperative Federation Ltd.

On 11 November 1942 he married Pearl Estelle Dent (died 2005) at St Matthew's Church in Gayndah and together had two sons and a daughter.

He was a Parish Councillor of the Anglican Church in Gayndah and a member of the local Masonic Lodge.

Wharton died in January 2003 and was buried in the Gayndah Cemetery.

== Public career ==
Wharton, a member of the Country Party (later known as both the National Country Party and the National Party), won the reincarnated seat of Burnett at the 1960 Queensland state election. He went on to represent the electorate for 26 years, retiring in 1986.

As the Minister for Works, Wharton visited many schools in the days when it was customary for the school to be given a day's holiday on the visit of a Minister. In fact, he visited so many schools that he became known as "Holiday Claude".

He held many roles whilst in parliament including the following:

- Minister for Aboriginal and Islanders Advancement 1975
- Minister for Works and Housing 1977-1986
- Member of the Parliamentary Building Committee 1969-1974
- Temporary Chairman of Committees 1970-1974
- Member of the Parliamentary Delegation to New Zealand and South Pacific 1970
- Delegate to the General Conference of the Commonwealth Parliamentary Association in London 1973
- Member of the Standing Orders Committee 1979
- Leader of the Parliamentary Delegation to Fiji, Tonga and Samoa 1984
- Minister for Aboriginal and Islanders Advancement and Fisheries 1975-1977
- Leader of the House 1979-1986

== Honours ==
For his services as a Minister of the Crown, Wharton was awarded the Queensland Companion of the Most Distinguished Order of St Michael and St George (CMG) in 1985.

He was the President and International Director of the Rotary Club of Gayndah, receiving Rotary's highest honour - the Paul Harris Fellowship in 1999.

== Legacy ==
- Claude Wharton Weir in Gayndah
- Claude Wharton Park, Brooweena
- Claude Wharton Drive, Monduran,
- Claude Wharton Drive, Miriam Vale
- Claude Wharton Building Bundaberg
- In Gayndah, a plaque commemorates the commissioning of the fountain and surrounds at Gayndah Court House on 10 November 1979 by Honourable Claude Wharton.

Parliament of Queensland
| New seat | Member for Burnett; 1960–1986 | Succeeded by Doug Slack |
