= Willington, Tyne and Wear =

Coordinates: 55°00′00″N 1°30′30″W

Willington
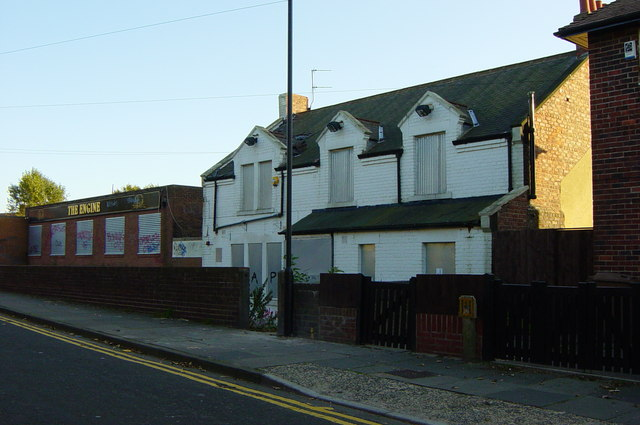
- The Engine

- Location within Tyne and Wear
- Metropolitan borough: North Tyneside
- Metropolitan county: Tyne and Wear
- Region: North East
- Country: England
- Sovereign state: United Kingdom
- Post town: WALLSEND
- Postcode district: NE28
- Dialling code: 0191
- Police: Northumbria
- Fire: Tyne and Wear
- Ambulance: North East

Willington is an area in the North Tyneside district, in the county of Tyne and Wear, England. It has an industrial estate.

== History ==
The place-name derives from Old English tun (homestead or farm) of Wifel's people, and appears in 1085 as Wiflintun, and as Wiuelington in 1204.

Willington was formerly a township and chapelry in the parish of Walls-end, on 30 September 1894 Willington became a separate civil parish, being formed from the rural part of Wallsend, on 9 November 1910 the parish was abolished and merged with Wallsend. In 1901 the parish had a population of 1999.

== Folklore ==
Willington became famous in the mid nineteenth century because of a ghost associated with a corn mill there owned by Joseph Procter, a local quaker. Information about this celebrated haunting was gathered together in 1892 by Procter's son.
