= William Henry Baynes =

Australian politician (1833-1898)

William Bailey

Member of the Queensland Legislative Assembly for Burnett
- In office 28 November 1878 – 1 October 1883
- Preceded by: Francis Ivory
- Succeeded by: Berkeley Moreton

Personal details
- Born: William Henry Baynes; 1833 England
- Died: 4 September 1898 (aged 64-65) Batavia, Dutch East Indies
- Resting place: South Brisbane Cemetery
- Spouse: Sarah Robinson
- Occupation: Butcher, Wool scourer

William Henry Baynes (1833–1898) was a politician in Queensland, Australia. He was a Member of the Queensland Legislative Assembly.

== Early life ==
William Henry Baynes was born in 1833 in England. He married Sarah (née. Robinson) and they had three sons, Harry, George and Ernest. In 1859 Baynes moved from Hawthorne, Victoria, to Brisbane, Queensland.

== Political career ==
He represented the District of Burnett in the Legislative Assembly of Queensland, from 28 Nov 1878 to 1 Oct 1883. In 1881 he introduced a Selectors Relief Bill, which failed to pass.

== Career ==
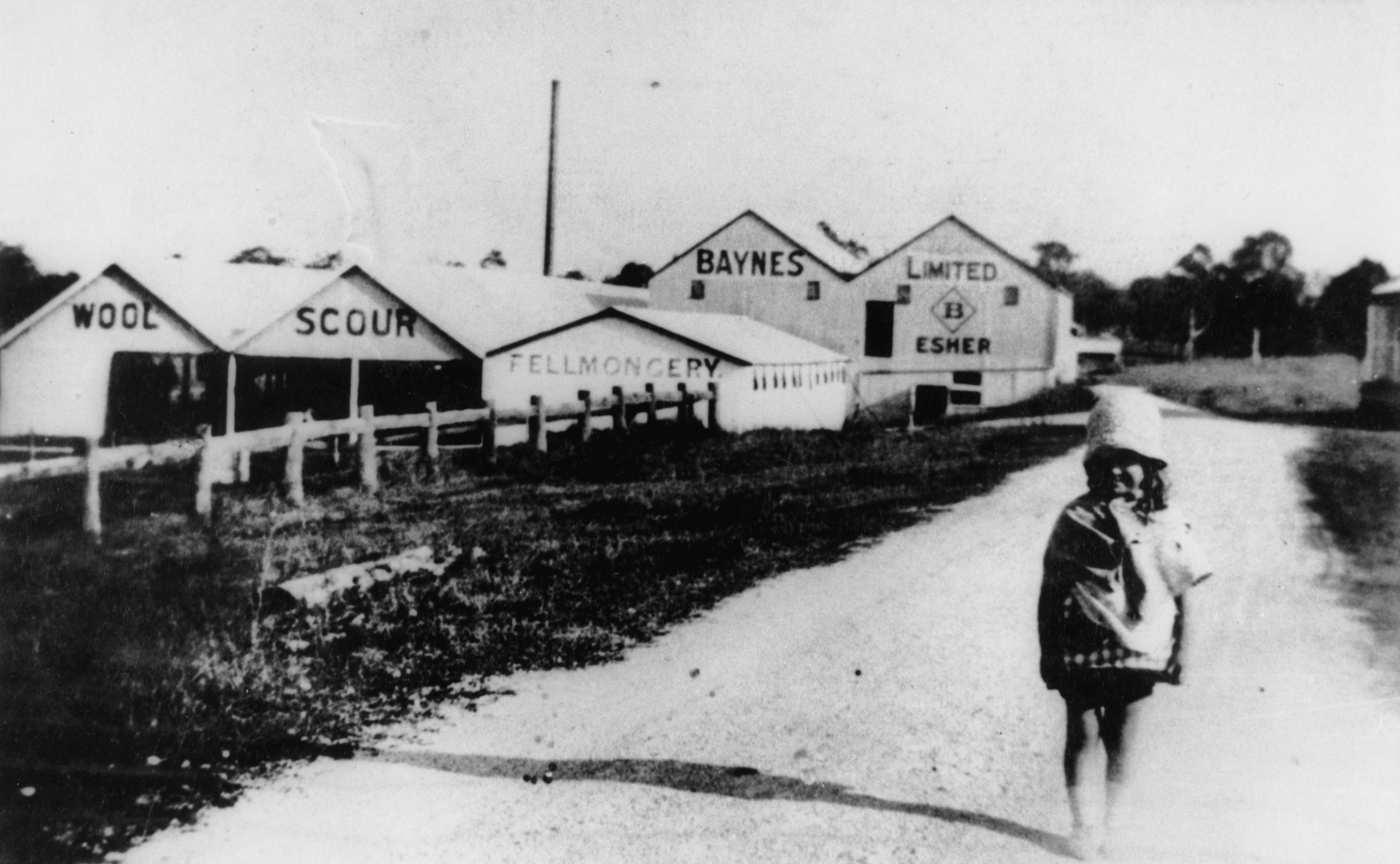
Baynes Bros Woolscour & Fellmongery in Belmont, Brisbane

In 1859 Baynes joined Isaac and Hugh Moore on Barambah station in the Burnett district and on Condamine Plains on the Darling Downs. He was one of the pioneers of the meat-preserving industry and has seen the trade develop from its very beginning. He established a butchering business in South Brisbane in 1859 and expanded to wholesale trade. In 1880, with his brothers, Baynes established the Graziers Butchering Co. and the Graziers Meat Export Co. The companies were sold in 1885 to a new partnership of the three Baynes sons (Harry, George and Ernest) and George Hooper, who was replaced in 1888 by John V Francis. The firm undertook meat preserving in leased premises at Queensport and had nearly 30 suburban shops as well as a plant at Belmont for fellmongering, wool scouring and soap making. In 1894 they registered the Graziers Butchering and Meat Export Co. Ltd with power to take over the assets of the two older companies. Baynes sons were bankrupt for a time but were discharged in March 1898 and immediately registered a new firm, Baynes Bros. George left the firm in 1899 and Ernest in 1912. With a new partner John Stitt, Harry reorganised the firm in 1918 as Baynes Ltd.

== Later life ==
Baynes died of acute meningitis on 4 September 1898, aged 66 years, whilst on business in Batavia, where he had just secured arrangements with the Netherlands India Company.

His body was brought back to Brisbane on the steamer, Duke of Buckingham to be buried in South Brisbane Cemetery, Plot 8B, grave 20A.

Parliament of Queensland
Preceded by Francis Ivory	Member for Burnett; 1878–1883	Succeeded by Berkeley Moreton
