= Francis Ivory =

Australian politician

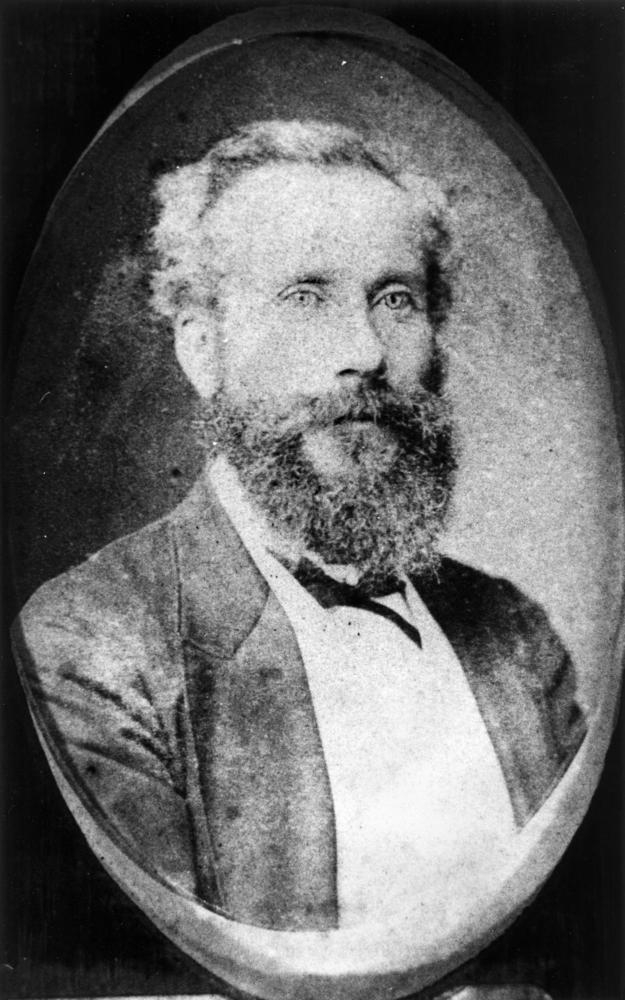

Member of the Queensland Legislative Assembly for Burnett
- In office 29 December 1873 – 28 November 1878
- Preceded by: New seat
- Succeeded by: William Baynes

Member of the Queensland Legislative Council
- In office 15 September 1879 – 1 July 1881

Personal details
- Born: Francis Jeffery Ivory; 1831 Edinburgh, Scotland
- Died: 21 January 1896 (aged 64–65) Brisbane, Queensland, Australia
- Resting place: Toowong Cemetery
- Spouse: Hester Mary Edwards (m.1881 d.1925)
- Relations: James Ivory (father)
- Occupation: Grazier

Francis Jeffery Ivory (1831 – 21 January 1896) was a grazier and politician in Queensland, Australia. He was a Member of the Queensland Legislative Assembly and a Member of the Queensland Legislative Council. Together with his brother Alexander, he is believed to be the first golfer in Queensland.

== Early life ==
Francis Jeffery Ivory was born in 1831 in Edinburgh, Scotland, the son of judge James Ivory and his wife Ann (née Laurie); He is named after Francis Jeffrey, the Scotland Lord Advocate who appointed father James Ivory as advocate depute in 1830. Francis Ivory was privately educated in Edinburgh.

== Politics ==
Francis Ivory was elected to the Queensland Legislative Assembly in the electoral district of Burnett in a by-election on 29 December 1873. He held that seat until 28 November 1878.

On 15 September 1879, he was appointed to the Queensland Legislative Council. Although a lifetime appointment, he resigned on 1 July 1881 in order to take up an appointment as the Clerk's assistant in the Legislative Assembly.

== Personal life ==
Francis Ivory had three children with Caroline, an Aboriginal woman of the Gooreng Gooreng people of the Mount Perry area in the North Burnett Region of Queensland, Australia. 1. Jessie born 1868 2. Frank born 1871 and 3. William 'Billy' born 1881. Caroline worked at Eidsvold Station.

The second child, Frank Ivory (1871–1957) was sent to boarding school at age 10 and after a couple of years at Maryborough Central School was enrolled in Maryborough Boys Grammar. Frank went on to represented Queensland in AFL and rugby.

In 1881 Francis married Hester Mary Edwards.

In c1891 Francis wanted to send his youngest son William 'Billy' to boarding school just as he'd done with Frank. Caroline, afraid of losing another son took Billy and left Eidsvold Station.

== Golf ==
The first golf known to be played in Queensland involved Francis Ivory and his brother Alexander Ivory, who laid out a few holes on their Eidsvold pastoral station in the 1880s.

== Later life ==
Ivory died on 21 January 1896 in Brisbane having been ailing for four months. He was buried on 22 January 1896 in Toowong Cemetery.

Parliament of Queensland
New seat	Member for Burnett; 1873–1878	Succeeded by William Baynes
