= George Hall Jones =

Australian politician

George Hall Jones (1837 – 2 September 1899) was a politician in colonial Queensland. He was a member of the Queensland Legislative Assembly from 1888 to 1891, representing the electorate of Burnett.
