= John Bramston (Australian politician) =

Australian politician

Sir John Bramston GCMG CB
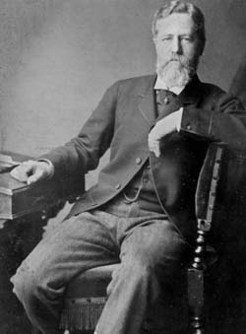

Member of the Queensland Legislative Council
- In office 3 July 1863 – 17 November 1869

Member of the Queensland Legislative Assembly for Burnett
- In office 3 April 1871 – 8 December 1873 Serving with Berkeley Moreton
- Preceded by: Charles Haly
- Succeeded by: Seat abolished

Personal details
- Born: John Bramston; 14 November 1832 Roxwell, Essex, England
- Died: 13 September 1921 (aged 88) Wimbledon, England
- Resting place: Wimbledon Cemetery
- Spouse: Eliza Isabella Russell (m.1872 d.1920)
- Relations: Thomas Bramston (father)
- Education: Balliol College, Oxford; All Souls College, Oxford
- Occupation: Barrister

Sir John Bramston, GCMG, CB (14 November 1832 – 13 September 1921), was a politician in Queensland (now part of Australia) and a British colonial government administrator in Queensland and Hong Kong. He then served as Assistant Under-Secretary of State for the Colonies in London for 20 years.

== Early life ==
Born on 14 November 1832 in Roxwell, Essex, Bramston was the second son of Thomas William Bramston (later MP for South Essex), of Skreens, Essex and his wife Eliza, daughter of Admiral Sir Eliab Harvey. He was educated at Winchester College and at Balliol College, Oxford, where he graduated B.A. in 1854, becoming Fellow of All Souls College, Oxford in the following year, and D.C.L. in 1863. He entered the Middle Temple in November 1854 and was called to the bar in June 1857.

== Queensland ==
He went to Queensland in 1859 as private secretary to Sir George Bowen, the first Governor of Queensland, and held that post for two years when he resigned.

On 3 July 1863, he was appointed as a Member of the Queensland Legislative Council, and was a member without a portfolio of the first Ministry formed by his friend Sir Robert Herbert, the first Premier of Queensland, from July 1863 to February 1866, acting briefly as Attorney-General from 31 August 1865 to 11 September 1865. Although his membership of the Legislative Council was a lifetime appointment, Bramston resigned on 17 November 1869.

Robert Herbert established a farm in the Brisbane area and lived in the farmhouse with John Bramston. The pair named their house Herston, a combination of their surnames, which eventually became the name of the suburb of Herston.

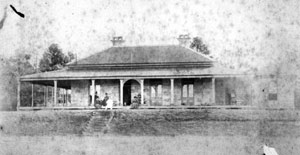
Herston House, c. 1890

Robert Herbert met his companion, John Bramston, at Balliol College Oxford University, England in the early 1850s. The pair shared rooms at Oxford, and also in London. When Herbert was Premier of Queensland, and Bramston his Attorney-General, the two created a farm on what is now the site of the Royal Brisbane and Women's Hospital. They named the farmhouse in which they both lived "Herston", a combination of their names, which is now the name of the modern day suburb.

Herbert never married, and modern historians, such as Robert Aldrich, Clive Moore, Robert French, and Garry Wotherspoon, conclude that he was likely gay. "Was it a romantic friendship that lasted 50 years?" Aldrich and Wotherspoon ask. "Or should we call them Romantic Friends, the concept of same-sex devotion current in the eighteenth and nineteenth centuries, but no longer extant?" as Moore says. "Whatever the process of Herbert’s thinking about a colonial excursion, it was somehow shared by his friend: Bramston went to Queensland hard on Herbert’s heels" that much is clear.

== England ==
Subsequently, Bramston returned to England, and remained for two years, acting in 1867 as Assistant Boundary Commissioner for Devon and Cornwall under the Reform Act of that year.

== Return to Queensland ==
Bramston returned to Queensland in 1868. When Charles Haley resigned as Member of the Queensland Legislative Assembly for Burnett, Bramston was elected in the resulting by-election on 3 April 1871. He held the seat until 8 December 1873, when the electorate was abolished in a redistribution. During this time, he was Queensland's Attorney-General in the Palmer Ministry from 3 May 1870 to 2 January 1874.

On 12 December 1872 at St John's Cathedral (Brisbane) in Brisbane, Bramston married Eliza Isabella Russell, daughter of Rev. Harry Vane Russell and niece of the Governor of Queensland, George Phipps, 2nd Marquess of Normanby (who had married Laura Russell, sister to Harry Russell). The service was conducted by the Bishop of Brisbane, Edward Tufnell. The Governor hosted a wedding reception at Government House and the couple honeymooned in Sydney and Tasmania.

== Hong Kong ==
In 1874 Bramston was appointed Attorney General of Hong Kong replacing Julian Pauncefote. From time to time as Attorney General, he also acted as a judge in Hong Kong.

== Return to England ==
In June 1876 Bramston was appointed as Assistant Under Secretary of State in the Colonial Office, being employed on a mission to Berlin in connection with the Angra Pequena negotiations in July 1886, in which year he was created Companion of the Order of the Bath.

In October 1887, Bramston's death was announced in the Queensland newspapers, resulting in the publication of many obituaries. However, it turned out to be an error arising from a misinterpretation of a telegram.

John Bramston was appointed Registrar of the Order of St. Michael and St. George in 1892.

He served as Assistant Under-Secretary of State for the Colonies for more than 20 years, retiring in 1898 upon which he was created Knight Commander of the Order of St Michael and St George (KCMG).

In 1899 he was sent as Royal Commissioner in conjunction with Admiral Sir James Erskine to inquire into French treaty rights in Newfoundland. The dispute was settled by the Entente Cordiale of 1904. Similarly Bramston was a member of the Royal Commission for the Paris Exhibition of 1900. In the 1900 New Year Honours list he was promoted to Knight Grand Cross of the Order of St Michael and St George (GCMG), and he received the order from Queen Victoria during an investiture at Windsor Castle on 1 March 1900.

== Death ==
His wife, Lady Bramston, died in 1920. Bramston died at Wimbledon on Tuesday 13 September 1921, and was buried at the Wimbledon Cemetery.

== See also ==
- Members of the Queensland Legislative Council, 1860–1869
- Members of the Queensland Legislative Assembly, 1870–1871; 1871-1873

Parliament of Queensland
Preceded by Charles Haly	Member for Burnett; 1871–1873; Served alongside: Berkeley Moreton	Abolished
