= James John Cadell =

Australian politician

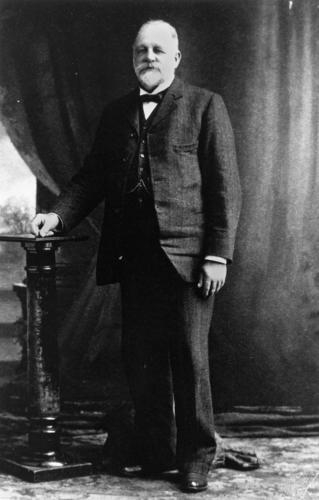
Photograph of John James Cadell of Ideraway Station, Gayndah. Image from the John Oxley Library, State Library of Queensland.

James John Cadell, was a politician in Queensland, Australia. He was a Member of the Queensland Legislative Assembly for the electoral district of Burnett from 11 July 1891 to 28 March 1896.

== Early life ==
James John Cadell was born 5 November 1843 in the Hunter River region, New South Wales, Australia. He was educated at Windsor, New South Wales by Judge Carey. James John Cadell married Elizabeth Hume Dight in Workworth, New South Wales in 1871 and together they had 2 sons and 8 daughters.

Before his parliamentary career James John Cadell was a pastoralist at Kitikarara Station. He managed Peel River Station for father (1861–70). In partnership with John Charles Clark-Kennedy he purchased Ideraway Station at Gayndah, Queensland in 1870. The partnership was dissolved by mutual consent in June, 1873, after which Ideraway was controlled by Cadell.

== Political career ==
James John Cadell's political career included being a Queensland Member of Parliament for the electoral district of Burnett (1891–1896) and was Mayor of Gayndah (1880). James John Cadell was also a member of the Rawbelle Division Board, Burnett Pastoral Association and Turf Club.

In some newspaper reports he appeared to be in favour of the extension of the Mungar Junction to Degilbo railway line to Gayndah, which would pass through Ideraway Station. In 1897 he was elected a vice-president of the newly formed Gayndah branch of the Gayndah Railway Extension Association. However other newspaper reports intimated that as a pastoralist he was not in favour of the closer settlement that would come with the railway, impacting on the continuity of his lease.

== Later life ==
John James Cadell died on the 11 December 1919 in Gayndah, Queensland.
