= Thomas McIlwraith =

Australian politician (1835–1900)

The Honourable Sir Thomas McIlwraith KCMG
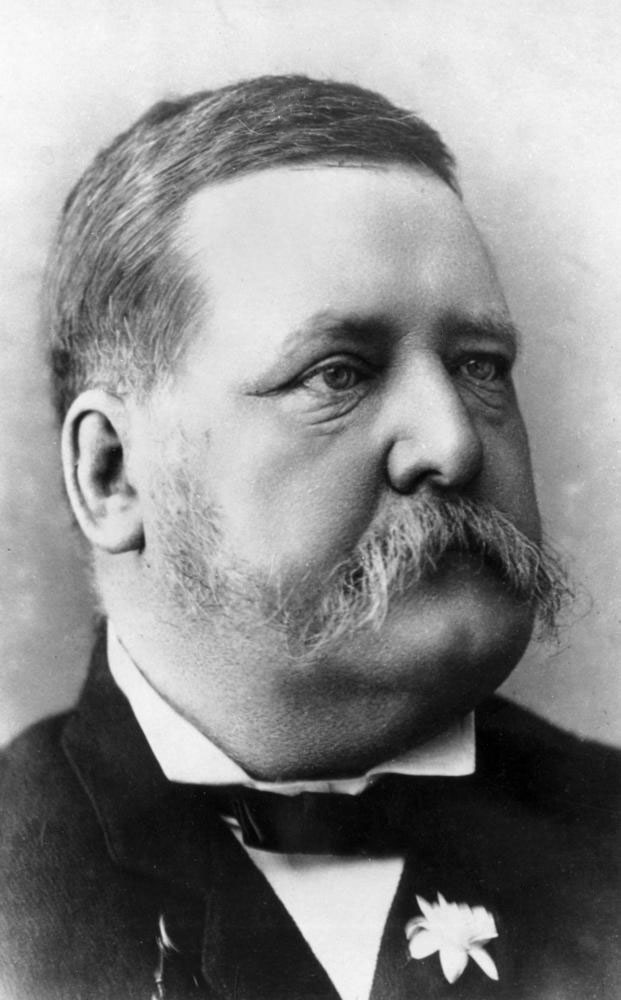

8th Premier of Queensland
- In office 27 March 1893 – 27 October 1893
- Monarch: Victoria
- Governor: Sir Arthur Kennedy; Sir Anthony Musgrave; Sir Henry Wylie Norman
- Preceded by: Sir Samuel Griffith
- Succeeded by: Hugh Nelson
- In office 13 June 1888 – 30 November 1888
- Preceded by: Samuel Griffith
- Succeeded by: Boyd Dunlop Morehead
- In office 21 January 1879 – 13 November 1883
- Preceded by: John Douglas
- Succeeded by: Samuel Griffith

11th Treasurer of Queensland
- In office 12 August 1890 – 27 March 1893
- Preceded by: John Donaldson
- Succeeded by: Hugh Nelson
- In office 13 June 1888 – 30 November 1888
- Preceded by: Samuel Griffith
- Succeeded by: William Pattison
- In office 21 January 1879 – 5 January 1882
- Preceded by: James Dickson
- Succeeded by: Archibald Archer

Member of the Queensland Legislative Assembly
- In office 5 May 1888 – 21 March 1896 Serving with Samuel Griffith, John Kingsbury, Robert Fraser
- Preceded by: Seat established
- Succeeded by: Thomas MacDonald-Paterson
- Constituency: Brisbane North
- In office 21 November 1878 – 5 June 1886
- Preceded by: Walter Scott
- Succeeded by: Walter Adams
- Constituency: Mulgrave
- In office 25 November 1873 – 20 November 1878
- Preceded by: William Miles
- Succeeded by: James Lalor
- Constituency: Maranoa
- In office 5 January 1870 – 8 August 1871
- Preceded by: Arthur Hodgson
- Succeeded by: Archibald Buchanan
- Constituency: Warrego

Personal details
- Born: 17 May 1835 Ayr, Scotland
- Died: 17 July 1900 (aged 65) Kensington, London, England
- Height: 6 ft (183 cm)
- Spouses: Margaret Whannell (m. 1863; died 1877) Harriette Mosman (m. 1879)
- Relations: Archibald Mosman (father-in-law); Hugh Mosman (brother-in-law); Arthur Hunter Palmer (brother-in-law)
- Children: 5
- Education: Ayr Academy
- Alma mater: University of Glasgow (Note: Did not graduate.)

Sir Thomas McIlwraith KCMG (17 May 1835 – 17 July 1900) was the Premier of Queensland between 1879 and 1883, 1888, and in 1893. McIlwraith was a dominant figure of colonial politics in Queensland during the late 19th century and, in common with most politicians of his era, was an influential businessman, who combined his parliamentary career with a prosperous involvement in the pastoral industry.

== Early life ==
Thomas McIlwraith, nicknamed Tom, was born on 17 May 1835 in Ayr in the Scottish Lowlands to John McIlwraith (1808–1885), a plumber and gasfitter, and Janet Howat (1809–1886). He was the fourth child in a what became a family of 12. Thomas was baptised on Sunday 5 July 1835, 49 days after his birth. Thomas's paternal lineage had strong links to the Presbyterian political movement the Covenanters, for which Ayrshire was the heartland of their cause. The McIlwraith family were prominent nineteenth-century Scottish Liberals who played a significant role in the campaign for parliamentary reform. As pillars of the Liberal Party, they supported the expansion of voting rights and greater political representation, helping advance the liberal reforms that transformed Scottish politics after 1832.

In his youth, McIlwraith had attended the Wallacetown Academy alongside his eldest brother John. The Wallacetown Academy had been established in the 1830s, and was considered a first-rate private school. In his final schooling years, McIlwraith attended Ayr Academy. By 1851, McIlwraith had enrolled at the University of Glasgow at age 16, the first in the family to so. Although McIlwraith studied Greek, Logic, Ethics, and excelled in Mathematics throughout the 1852 to 1854 academic years, he ultimately did not graduate and instead sailed to Victoria, Australia in 1854 after being encouraged by his brothers business success gold mining in the colony during the gold rush.

== Australia ==
McIlwraith worked as a surveyor and engineer for the Department of Railways, and subsequently as a partner with Messrs Cornish and Bruce, railway contractors. He also invested in eight pastoral holdings in the Maranoa district in Queensland.

He retained close relations with his brother John, and on 6 June 1863 married Margaret Whannell, sister of John's wife. They had three daughters, Jessie (b. 1866), Mary (b. 1868) and Blanche (b. 1872). He eventually moved to Queensland, but Margaret was reluctant to live in isolated Merivale station. In 1871 she visited Merivale, but soon returned to Melbourne for Blanche's birth. In 1874 they decided to live in Brisbane. Thomas found that she was drinking heavily, and sent her to Scotland where she died in 1877. McIlwraith fathered an illegitimate daughter in Victoria. In 1877 McIlwraith was a founding partner of the North Australian Pastoral Company. In 1879 he married Harriette Ann née Mosman. Harriette was the sister of Hugh Mosman, who discovered gold in Charters Towers, and Cecilia Mosman, wife of his political colleague Arthur Palmer (also Premier of Queensland); she gave birth to his fourth legitimate daughter in 1881. Lady Harriette McIlwraith gave a generous donation of over an acre of land to the then Toowong Council and the McIlwraith Croquet Club was formed 20th September 1923, on this land. The McIlwraith Croquet Club has a legacy spanning a century of continuous operation, preserving the tradition of the elegant sport while fostering a welcoming and inclusive community environment.

== Parliamentary career ==
While working for J V A Bruce, he represented his employers in a dispute with the Victorian government, and attracted public attention. In 1864 he contested the Sandhurst seat in the Victorian Legislative Assembly but won few votes as a free trader.

McIlwraith was elected to the Legislative Assembly in the seat of Maranoa in 1868.

He joined the ministry of Arthur Macalister in January 1874 becoming Secretary for Public Works and Mines. He resigned from these posts in October of that year.

The government of John Douglas was defeated in 1879 after a series of severe droughts and McIlwraith became premier for the first time. He quickly worked to ameliorate the colony's finances and with the assistance of a return of agricultural prosperity he turned the budget deficit into a surplus. Queensland at this stage was seeing increasing numbers of immigrants and McIlwraith oversaw the colony's economic development. The McIlwraith government introduced the divisional system of local government to the larger part of Queensland and assisted in establishing a postal service through the Torres Strait Islands. In 1882 he was knighted.

The Australian colonies were extremely anxious about German colonial activities in the region, it became clear that the German government was planning to annex eastern New Guinea, to Queensland's north. McIlwraith took the extraordinary step of attempting to annex New Guinea for Queensland; he employed Henry Chester to proclaim the Queen's sovereignty which occurred on 4 April 1883. This was later disallowed by the British Secretary of State for the Colonies, Lord Derby on the basis that a colonial government had no authority to annex other colonies. Indignation at this apparent slight to colonial prerogatives incited the gathering of an Intercolonial Convention in November and December 1883, with federation and annexation on its agenda. This proved to be a first step in the federation movement, and more quickly resulted in the establishment in 1884 of the Federal Council of Australasia. Orders were eventually given to establish British New Guinea as a protectorate on the southern coast of the eastern coast of New Guinea on 6 November 1884. However, a well-informed German Navy had secretly landed, annexing the northern coast under the name ‘Kaiser-Wilhelmsland’ three days earlier. News about German New Guinea was successfully kept a secret until it finally broke on 22 December that year. The following day an irate McIlwraith told the Queensland parliament that British conduct in this affair constituted "the grossest piece of treachery on the part of the English government to the colonies that has ever been perpetrated".

In 1883 a government proposal to raise funds for the construction of a transcontinental railway line by a system of land grants was attacked for corruption in allocation of grants. McIlwraith lost office to his rival, Samuel Griffith, in November and retired from politics in 1886.

McIlwraith returned to stand for Parliament in 1888, this time as member for North Brisbane. His "National Australia Party" won a majority in the elections and he again became Premier and Treasurer. He came into conflict with the colony's Governor, Sir Anthony Musgrave over the exercise of the royal pardon. Musgrave died in October and McIlwraith petitioned the new Colonial Secretary Lord Knutsford, to allow the Queensland government to be consulted on the choice of governor. Knutsford refused and appointed Sir Harry Blake. The local legislature problematically declined to ratify the appointment, but henceforth it was understood that the colonies would be consulted in vice-regal appoinyments. In November of that year ill-health forced McIlwraith to resign in favour of Boyd Dunlop Morehead, whereupon he travelled to China and Japan.

After his return McIlwraith's relationship with his colleagues deteriorated, and in August 1890 he formed an alliance (later known as the "Continuous Ministry") with his erstwhile foe to become Treasurer in the government of Sir Samuel Griffith. In March 1893 Griffith stepped down to join the Supreme Court of Queensland and McIlwraith became Premier again. His health was still poor and in October he resigned in favour of Hugh Nelson, contenting himself with the cabinet position of Chief Secretary and secretary for railways until 29 March 1895.

The Dictionary of Australian of Biography says:

McIlwraith was a big man with big ideas, but his indifferent health did not allow him to successfully carry the full burden of them. He was rugged and masterful, possibly on occasions not over-scrupulous, with a habit of getting his own way by sheer force of character rather than by intellectual ability. For nearly 25 years he was one of the greatest personalities in Queensland.

== After politics ==
Since 1888 the London directors of McIlwraith's Queensland Investment and Land Mortgage Co. had complained about the practices of the local board, and in 1892 they charged McIlwraith, Palmer and two others with fraud. The remaining years of his life were surrounded in financial scandal and large financial losses by institutions that he was involved with.

Although McIlwraith left for England on 15 January 1895, he was still a minister of the Queensland cabinet until 25 November 1897 when the Labor Party with government support succeeded in passing a resolution that he should retire. On 9 December he resigned from the Executive Council.

McIlwraith's aspirations for political integration of the Australian colonies centred on the Federal Council of Australasia, and he actively sought the entry of New South Wales into this body. In the 1899 referendum on the creation of a Commonwealth of Australia he urged Queenslanders to vote No to placing Queensland in the "hands of men unacquainted with the past, and who cannot in full share our hopes for the future".

== Legacy ==
The following places were named after him:

- McIlwraith, Queensland, a locality in the Bundaberg Region
- McIlwraith Range, Queensland, a mountain range in the Cook Shire

State Library of Queensland currently holds the Sir Thomas McIlwraith Papers 1839–1897 which contains legal documents, correspondence, accounts, financial records and telegrams relating to McIlwraith.

== Footnotes ==
Political offices
Preceded by John Douglas	Premier of Queensland; 1879–1883	Succeeded by Samuel Griffith
Preceded by Samuel Griffith	Premier of Queensland; 1888	Succeeded by Boyd Dunlop Morehead
Preceded by Sir Samuel Griffith	Premier of Queensland; 1893	Succeeded by Hugh Nelson
Parliament of Queensland
Preceded by Samuel Hodgson	Member for Warrego; 1870–1871	Succeeded by Archibald Buchanan
Preceded by William Miles	Member for Maranoa; 1873–1878	Succeeded by James Lalor
Preceded by Walter Scott	Member for Mulgrave; 1878–1886	Succeeded by Walter Adams
New seat	Member for Brisbane North; 1888–1896; Served alongside: Samuel Griffith, John Kingsbury, Robert Fraser	Succeeded by Thomas MacDonald-Paterson
