= Electoral results for the district of Warrego =

This is a list of electoral results for the electoral district of Warrego in Queensland state elections.

== Members for Warrego ==
Member	Party	Term
Frederick Forbes	Unaligned	1865–1867
Graham Mylne	Unaligned	1867–1868
Sir Arthur Hodgson	Unaligned	1868–1869
Sir Thomas McIlwraith	Ministerialist	1870–1871
Archibald Buchanan	Ministerialist	1871–1873
William Henry Walsh	Ministerialist	1873–1878
Ernest James Stevens	Independent	1878–1883
John Donaldson	Independent/Ministerialist	1883–1888
Richard Casey	Unaligned	1888–1893
Sir Arthur Hodgson	Unaligned	1888–1893
James Crombie	Ministerialist	1893–1898
William Hood	Ministerialist	1898–1899
David Bowman	Labor	1899–1902
Patrick Leahy	Ministerialist/Opposition	1902–1907
George Barber	Labor	1907
Patrick Leahy	Ministerialist/Opposition	1907–1908
Harry Coyne	Labor	1908–1923
Randolph Bedford	Labor	1923–1941
Harry O'Shea	Labor	1941–1950
John Dufficy	Labor	1951–1969
Jack Aiken	Labor	1969–1974
Neil Turner	National	1974–1986
Howard Hobbs	National	1986–2008
Howard Hobbs	Liberal National	2008–2015
Ann Leahy	Liberal National	2015–present

== Election results ==
=== Elections in the 2020s ===
2024 Queensland state election: Warrego
Party	Candidate	Votes	%	±%
Liberal National	Ann Leahy	16,135	61.1	+5.2
Labor	Jack Hargreaves	3,622	13.7	−6.0
One Nation	Hayley Titmarsh	2,424	9.2	+0.4
Family First	Christopher Schenk	1,396	5.3	+5.3
Legalise Cannabis	Angela Adams	1,148	4.4	+4.3
Independent	Daniel Gill	1,082	4.1	+4.1
Greens	Ian Mazlin	580	2.2	−0.1
Total formal votes		26,387	96.2	
Informal votes		1,045	3.8	
Turnout		27,432		
Two-party-preferred result
Liberal National	Ann Leahy	20,542	77.8	+4.7
Labor	Jack Hargreaves	5,845	22.2	−4.7
Liberal National hold		Swing	+4.7	

2020 Queensland state election: Warrego
Party	Candidate	Votes	%	±%
Liberal National	Ann Leahy	14,100	55.98	+8.35
Labor	Mark O'Brien	4,966	19.72	−1.97
Katter's Australian	Rick Gurnett	2,842	11.28	−9.96
One Nation	Joshua Coyne	2,224	8.83	+8.83
Greens	Joshua Sanderson	569	2.26	−0.83
Independent	Mark Stone	487	1.93	−1.51
Total formal votes		25,188	97.97	+2.17
Informal votes		521	2.03	−2.17
Turnout		25,709	87.72	−0.71
Two-party-preferred result
Liberal National	Ann Leahy	18,424	73.15	+8.80
Labor	Mark O'Brien	6,764	26.85	−8.80
Liberal National hold		Swing	+8.80	

=== Elections in the 2010s ===
2017 Queensland state election: Warrego
Party	Candidate	Votes	%	±%
Liberal National	Ann Leahy	11,949	47.6	−5.0
Labor	Mark O'Brien	5,441	21.7	−4.7
Katter's Australian	Rob Loughnan	5,329	21.2	+16.5
Independent	Mark Stone	863	3.4	+3.4
Greens	Ian Mazlin	775	3.1	+0.3
Independent	Sandra Bamberry	732	2.9	+2.9
Total formal votes		25,089	95.8	−2.1
Informal votes		1,100	4.2	+2.1
Turnout		26,189	88.4	−2.8
Two-candidate-preferred result
Liberal National	Ann Leahy	14,917	59.5	−5.0
Katter's Australian	Rob Loughnan	10,172	40.5	+40.5
Liberal National hold		Swing	−5.0	

2015 Queensland state election: Warrego
Party	Candidate	Votes	%	±%
Liberal National	Ann Leahy	13,285	54.96	−3.17
Labor	Mark O'Brien	6,398	26.47	+13.82
Palmer United	Guy Sara	2,179	9.01	+9.01
Independent	Ruth Golden	1,663	6.88	−6.31
Greens	Sandra Bayley	649	2.68	+0.70
Total formal votes		24,174	97.93	−0.47
Informal votes		510	2.07	+0.47
Turnout		24,684	91.45	−0.32
Two-party-preferred result
Liberal National	Ann Leahy	14,255	65.43	−9.63
Labor	Mark O'Brien	7,531	34.57	+34.57
Liberal National hold		Swing	−9.63	

2012 Queensland state election: Warrego
Party	Candidate	Votes	%	±%
Liberal National	Howard Hobbs	13,770	58.13	−1.63
Katter's Australian	Robert Earixson	3,330	14.06	+14.06
Independent	Mark O'Brien	3,124	13.19	+13.19
Labor	David Bowden	2,995	12.64	−6.31
Greens	Graeme Maizey	470	1.98	+0.20
Total formal votes		23,689	98.40	−0.16
Informal votes		385	1.60	+0.16
Turnout		24,074	91.77	+0.88
Two-candidate-preferred result
Liberal National	Howard Hobbs	15,107	75.06	+0.72
Independent	Mark O'Brien	5,019	24.94	+24.94
Liberal National hold		Swing	+0.72	

=== Elections in the 2000s ===
2009 Queensland state election: Warrego
Party	Candidate	Votes	%	±%
Liberal National	Howard Hobbs	13,805	59.8	−5.4
Labor	Elliott Thornton	4,378	19.0	−5.1
Independent	Wally Gleeson	3,831	16.6	+16.6
Family First	Tony Kusters	548	2.4	−3.8
Greens	Kathryn Wildermuth	411	1.8	+1.8
Independent	Allen Hassall	126	0.5	+0.5
Total formal votes		23,099	98.6	
Informal votes		311	1.4	
Turnout		23,410	90.8	
Two-party-preferred result
Liberal National	Howard Hobbs	14,884	74.3	+1.7
Labor	Elliott Thornton	5,138	25.7	−1.7
Liberal National hold		Swing	+1.7	

2006 Queensland state election: Warrego
Party	Candidate	Votes	%	±%
National	Howard Hobbs	12,312	65.5	+7.2
Labor	Marlene Johanson	4,390	23.4	+5.2
Family First	Tony Kusters	1,145	6.1	+6.1
Independent	Ruth Spencer	946	5.0	−5.7
Total formal votes		18,793	98.4	+0.0
Informal votes		306	1.6	−0.0
Turnout		19,099	90.9	−1.8
Two-party-preferred result
National	Howard Hobbs	13,044	73.3	−1.5
Labor	Marlene Johanson	4,741	26.7	+1.5
National hold		Swing	−1.5	

2004 Queensland state election: Warrego
Party	Candidate	Votes	%	±%
National	Howard Hobbs	11,403	58.3	+24.5
Labor	Russell Burns	3,555	18.2	+1.9
Independent	Ruth Spencer	2,088	10.7	+10.7
One Nation	Robert Burton	1,792	9.2	−14.6
Independent	Malcolm Groves	729	3.7	+3.7
Total formal votes		19,567	98.4	−0.4
Informal votes		324	1.6	+0.4
Turnout		19,891	92.7	−0.6
Two-party-preferred result
National	Howard Hobbs	13,080	74.8	+24.5
Labor	Russell Burns	4,415	25.2	+25.2
National hold		Swing	+24.5	

2001 Queensland state election: Warrego
Party	Candidate	Votes	%	±%
National	Howard Hobbs	6,737	33.8	−13.3
Independent	Wally Gleeson	5,193	26.1	+26.1
One Nation	Robert Burton	4,733	23.8	−4.3
Labor	Anthony Chisholm	3,243	16.3	−4.6
Total formal votes		19,906	98.8	
Informal votes		239	1.2	
Turnout		20,145	93.3	
Two-candidate-preferred result
National	Howard Hobbs	7,943	50.3	−13.1
Independent	Wally Gleeson	7,847	49.7	+49.7
National hold		Swing	−13.1	

=== Elections in the 1990s ===
1998 Queensland state election: Warrego
Party	Candidate	Votes	%	±%
National	Howard Hobbs	5,550	42.0	−28.7
Labor	Elizabeth Pommer	3,287	24.9	−4.4
One Nation	Victor Espie	3,118	23.6	+23.6
Independent	Sandy Kidd	1,075	8.1	+8.1
Shooters	Bev Salisbury	186	1.4	+1.4
Total formal votes		13,216	98.7	+0.1
Informal votes		170	1.3	−0.1
Turnout		13,386	93.1	+1.6
Two-party-preferred result
National	Howard Hobbs	7,810	65.3	−5.4
Labor	Elizabeth Pommer	4,146	34.7	+5.4
National hold		Swing	−5.4	

1995 Queensland state election: Warrego
Party	Candidate	Votes	%	±%
National	Howard Hobbs	9,115	70.7	+9.7
Labor	Murray Bensted	3,779	29.3	−5.2
Total formal votes		12,894	98.6	−0.1
Informal votes		183	1.4	+0.1
Turnout		13,077	91.5	
National hold		Swing	+7.1	

1992 Queensland state election: Warrego
Party	Candidate	Votes	%	±%
National	Howard Hobbs	8,648	61.0	+7.5
Labor	Mike Beilby	4,889	34.5	+0.6
Independent	Ian Hannah	640	4.5	+4.5
Total formal votes		14,177	98.7	
Informal votes		180	1.3	
Turnout		14,357	91.7	
Two-party-preferred result
National	Howard Hobbs	8,919	63.6	+0.3
Labor	Mike Beilby	5,111	36.4	−0.3
National hold		Swing	+0.3	

=== Elections in the 1980s ===
1989 Queensland state election: Warrego
Party	Candidate	Votes	%	±%
National	Howard Hobbs	3,912	49.3	−4.4
Labor	Gordon Harding	3,606	45.5	−0.8
Liberal	Kevin Trueman	415	5.2	+5.2
Total formal votes		7,933	97.8	−0.3
Informal votes		177	2.2	+0.3
Turnout		8,110	90.8	−0.2
Two-party-preferred result
National	Howard Hobbs	4,226	53.3	−0.4
Labor	Gordon Harding	3,707	46.7	+0.4
National hold		Swing	−0.4	

1986 Queensland state election: Warrego
Party	Candidate	Votes	%	±%
National	Howard Hobbs	4,155	53.7	−4.3
Labor	Gordon Harding	3,576	46.3	+4.3
Total formal votes		7,731	98.1	−1.0
Informal votes		153	1.9	+1.0
Turnout		7,884	91.0	−1.4
National hold		Swing	−4.3	

1983 Queensland state election: Warrego
Party	Candidate	Votes	%	±%
National	Neil Turner	4,364	57.7	+5.1
Labor	David Land	3,205	42.3	−5.1
Total formal votes		7,569	99.1	+0.5
Informal votes		69	0.9	−0.5
Turnout		7,638	92.4	+3.5
National hold		Swing	+5.1	

1980 Queensland state election: Warrego
Party	Candidate	Votes	%	±%
National	Neil Turner	3,826	52.6	+1.0
Labor	Michael Gordon	3,448	47.4	+1.1
Total formal votes		7,274	98.6	−0.6
Informal votes		104	1.4	+0.6
Turnout		7,378	88.9	−0.8
National hold		Swing	−0.4	

=== Elections in the 1970s ===
1977 Queensland state election: Warrego
Party	Candidate	Votes	%	±%
National	Neil Turner	3,798	51.6	−2.2
Labor	Michael Gordon	3,410	46.3	+0.1
Progress	Colin Drake	150	2.0	+2.0
Total formal votes		7,358	99.2	
Informal votes		61	0.8	
Turnout		7,419	89.7	
Two-party-preferred result
National	Neil Turner	3,903	53.0	−0.8
Labor	Michael Gordon	3,455	47.0	+0.8
National hold		Swing	−0.8	

1974 Queensland state election: Warrego
Party	Candidate	Votes	%	±%
National	Neil Turner	4,153	51.0	+14.4
Labor	Jack Aiken	3,985	49.0	−14.4
Total formal votes		8,078	98.6	−0.1
Informal votes		117	1.4	+0.1
Turnout		8,255	91.1	+0.9
National gain from Labor		Swing	+14.4	

1972 Queensland state election: Warrego
Party	Candidate	Votes	%	±%
Labor	Jack Aiken	4,728	63.4	+18.4
Country	John Nevell	2,729	36.6	−2.5
Total formal votes		7,457	98.7	
Informal votes		97	1.3	
Turnout		7,554	90.2	
Labor hold		Swing	+4.4	

=== Elections in the 1960s ===
1969 Queensland state election: Warrego
Party	Candidate	Votes	%	±%
Labor	Jack Aiken	3,020	45.0	−55.0
Country	Robert Anson	2,628	39.1	+39.1
Independent	Jack Tonkin	1,066	15.9	+15.9
Total formal votes		6,714	99.3	
Informal votes		49	0.7	
Turnout		6,763	84.4	
Two-party-preferred result
Labor	Jack Aiken	3,656	54.5	−45.5
Country	Robert Anson	3,058	45.5	+45.5
Labor hold		Swing	−45.5	

1966 Queensland state election: Warrego
Party	Candidate	Votes	%	±%
Labor	John Dufficy	unopposed		
Labor hold		Swing		

1963 Queensland state election: Warrego
Party	Candidate	Votes	%	±%
Labor	John Dufficy	4,500	63.6	−3.1
Country	Michael Turner	2,573	36.4	+36.4
Total formal votes		7,073	98.5	+1.5
Informal votes		108	1.5	−1.5
Turnout		7,181	88.1	+0.7
Labor hold		Swing	N/A	

1960 Queensland state election: Warrego
Party	Candidate	Votes	%	±%
Labor	John Dufficy	4,630	66.7	
Queensland Labor	John Glynn	2,307	33.3	
Total formal votes		6,937	97.0	
Informal votes		213	3.0	
Turnout		7,150	87.4	
Labor hold		Swing		

=== Elections in the 1950s ===
1957 Queensland state election: Warrego
Party	Candidate	Votes	%	±%
Labor	John Dufficy	2,358	44.8	−22.9
Country	Arnold White	1,550	29.4	−2.9
Queensland Labor	John Glynn	1,361	25.8	+25.8
Total formal votes		5,269	99.0	+0.6
Informal votes		53	1.0	−0.6
Turnout		5,322	89.4	+4.6
Labor hold		Swing	−7.4	

1956 Queensland state election: Warrego
Party	Candidate	Votes	%	±%
Labor	John Dufficy	3,248	67.7	−32.3
Country	William Mills	1,550	32.3	+32.3
Total formal votes		4,798	98.4	
Informal votes		76	1.6	
Turnout		4,874	84.8	
Labor hold		Swing	N/A	

1953 Queensland state election: Warrego
Party	Candidate	Votes	%	±%
Labor	John Dufficy	unopposed		
Labor hold		Swing		

1950 Queensland state election: Warrego
Party	Candidate	Votes	%	±%
Labor	Harry O'Shea	2,829	65.0	
Country	Ernest Parr	1,522	35.0	
Total formal votes		4,351	98.7	
Informal votes		56	1.3	
Turnout		4,407	86.1	
Labor hold		Swing		

=== Elections in the 1940s ===
1947 Queensland state election: Warrego
Party	Candidate	Votes	%	±%
Labor	Harry O'Shea	3,029	49.3	−20.3
Country	Robert King	2,320	37.7	+7.3
Independent	Cyril Healy	797	13.0	+13.0
Total formal votes		6,146	98.8	+1.4
Informal votes		72	1.2	−1.4
Turnout		6,128	85.2	+3.7
Labor hold		Swing	−13.0	

1944 Queensland state election: Warrego
Party	Candidate	Votes	%	±%
Labor	Harry O'Shea	4,107	69.6	+14.0
Country	William Addison	1,797	30.4	−14.0
Total formal votes		5,904	97.4	
Informal votes		157	2.6	
Turnout		6,061	81.5	+6.5
Labor hold		Swing	+14.0	

1941 Warrego state by-election: Warrego
Party	Candidate	Votes	%	±%
Labor	Harry O'Shea	3426	55.6	
Independent	C.V. Watson Brown	2187	35.5	
Independent	Oswald James Allen	547	8.9	
Turnout		6,160	75.0	
Labor hold		Swing	N/A	

1941 Queensland state election: Warrego
Party	Candidate	Votes	%	±%
Labor	Randolph Bedford	unopposed		
Labor hold		Swing		

=== Elections in the 1930s ===
1938 Queensland state election: Warrego
Party	Candidate	Votes	%	±%
Labor	Randolph Bedford	4,670	69.7	−30.3
Country	Charles Russell	2,027	30.3	+30.3
Total formal votes		6,697	99.2	
Informal votes		51	0.8	
Turnout		6,748	80.2	
Labor hold		Swing	N/A	

1935 Queensland state election: Warrego
Party	Candidate	Votes	%	±%
Labor	Randolph Bedford	unopposed		
Labor hold		Swing		

1932 Queensland state election: Warrego
Party	Candidate	Votes	%	±%
Labor	Randolph Bedford	3,171	55.3	
CPNP	John Fletcher	1,870	32.6	
Independent Labor	John Kerr	689	12.0	
Total formal votes		5,730	98.9	
Informal votes		63	1.1	
Turnout		5,793	85.6	
Labor hold		Swing		

- Preferences were not distributed.

=== Elections in the 1920s ===
1929 Queensland state election: Warrego
Party	Candidate	Votes	%	±%
Labor	Randolph Bedford	2,291	57.7	−42.3
CPNP	Oswald Allen	1,681	42.3	+42.3
Total formal votes		3,972	98.0	
Informal votes		79	2.0	
Turnout		4,051	75.4	
Labor hold		Swing	N/A	

1926 Queensland state election: Warrego
Party	Candidate	Votes	%	±%
Labor	Randolph Bedford	unopposed		
Labor hold		Swing		

1923 Queensland state election: Warrego
Party	Candidate	Votes	%	±%
Labor	Harry Coyne	2,309	70.2	+1.5
Independent	Thomas Lonsdale	979	29.8	+29.8
Total formal votes		3,288	98.3	+0.6
Informal votes		58	1.7	−0.6
Turnout		3,346	60.7	+4.7
Labor hold		Swing	N/A	

1920 Queensland state election: Warrego
Party	Candidate	Votes	%	±%
Labor	Harry Coyne	2,507	68.7	−5.6
Country	Herbert Yeates	1,144	31.3	+31.3
Total formal votes		3,651	97.7	0.0
Informal votes		86	2.3	0.0
Turnout		3,737	56.0	−5.0
Labor hold		Swing	−5.6	

=== Elections in the 1910s ===
1918 Queensland state election: Warrego
Party	Candidate	Votes	%	±%
Labor	Harry Coyne	2,414	74.3	−25.7
National	Jerry Tamblyn	836	25.7	+25.7
Total formal votes		3,250	97.7	
Informal votes		77	2.3	
Turnout		3,327	61.0	
Labor hold		Swing	N/A	

1915 Queensland state election: Warrego
Party	Candidate	Votes	%	±%
Labor	Harry Coyne	unopposed		
Labor hold		Swing		

1912 Queensland state election: Warrego
Party	Candidate	Votes	%	±%
Labor	Harry Coyne	1,758	65.4	
Liberal	Duncan McDonald	932	34.6	
Total formal votes		2,690	95.3	
Informal votes		134	4.7	
Turnout		2,824	69.7	
Labor hold		Swing		
