= Electoral results for the district of Logan =

Queensland, Australia, district election results

This is a list of electoral results for the electoral district of Logan in Queensland state elections.

== Members for Logan ==
First incarnation (1873–1950)
Member	Party	Term
Phillip Nind	Unaligned	1873–1875
Adam Black	Unaligned	1875
Frederick Shaw	Unaligned	1875–1876
Peter McLean	Unaligned	1876–1883
Ernest James Stevens	Independent	1883–1896
John Donaldson	Independent/Ministerialist	1896
James Stodart	Ministerialist/Opposition	1896–1918
Alfred James	Labor	1918–1920
Reginald King	National/United Party/ Country and Progressive National	1920–1935
John Brown	Labor	1935–1944
Sir Thomas Hiley	Queensland People's/ Liberal	1944–1950
Second incarnation (1960–1972)
Member	Party	Term
Leslie Harrison	Country	1960–1966
Dick Wood	Country	1966–1969
Edgar Baldwin	Labor	1969–1972
Third incarnation (1986–present)
Member	Party	Term
Wayne Goss	Labor	1986–1998
John Mickel	Labor	1998–2012
Michael Pucci	Liberal National	2012–2015
Linus Power	Labor	2015–present

== Election results ==
=== Elections in the 2020s ===
2024 Queensland state election: Logan
Party	Candidate	Votes	%	±%
Labor	Linus Power	15,965	40.66	−12.81
Liberal National	Mathew Owens	13,321	33.93	+9.03
One Nation	Aaron Abraham	3,975	10.13	−3.68
Greens	Joshua Riethmuller	2,543	6.48	+0.35
Legalise Cannabis	Jacqueline Verne	2,062	5.25	+5.25
Family First	Simon Taylor	1,395	3.55	+3.55
Total formal votes		39,261	94.38	−1.88
Informal votes		2,337	5.62	+1.88
Turnout		41,598	85.29	−0.20
Two-party-preferred result
Labor	Linus Power	21,304	54.26	−9.13
Liberal National	Mathew Owens	17,957	45.74	+9.13
Labor hold		Swing	−9.13	

2020 Queensland state election: Logan
Party	Candidate	Votes	%	±%
Labor	Linus Power	16,587	53.47	+11.15
Liberal National	Clinton Pattison	7,725	24.90	+6.60
One Nation	Peter Weber	4,283	13.81	−17.09
Greens	Liam Jenkinson	1,900	6.13	+1.24
United Australia	Sam Iskander	524	1.69	+1.69
Total formal votes		31,019	96.26	+1.95
Informal votes		1,205	3.74	−1.95
Turnout		32,224	85.49	−1.73
Two-party-preferred result
Labor	Linus Power	19,663	63.39	+6.10
Liberal National	Clinton Pattison	11,356	36.61	−6.10
Labor hold		Swing	+6.10	

=== Elections in the 2010s ===
2017 Queensland state election: Logan
Party	Candidate	Votes	%	±%
Labor	Linus Power	11,488	42.3	−2.8
One Nation	Scott Bannan	8,387	30.9	+29.1
Liberal National	Gloria Vicario	4,968	18.3	−19.3
Greens	Liam Jenkinson	1,327	4.9	−2.0
Independent	Danielle Cox	616	2.3	+2.3
Independent	Daniel Murphy	360	1.3	+1.3
Total formal votes		27,146	94.3	−2.7
Informal votes		1,638	5.7	+2.7
Turnout		28,784	87.2	−2.7
Two-candidate-preferred result
Labor	Linus Power	15,426	56.8	+0.9
One Nation	Scott Bannan	11,720	43.2	+43.2
Labor hold		Swing	+0.9	

2015 Queensland state election: Logan
Party	Candidate	Votes	%	±%
Labor	Linus Power	13,839	51.69	+18.40
Liberal National	Michael Pucci	9,267	34.61	−6.40
Greens	Kim Southwood	1,654	6.18	+0.80
Family First	David Pellowe	1,098	4.10	+4.10
Independent	Daniel Murphy	523	1.95	+1.95
Independent	Peter Ervik	393	1.47	+1.47
Total formal votes		26,774	96.89	+0.26
Informal votes		859	3.11	−0.26
Turnout		27,633	89.94	−1.34
Two-party-preferred result
Labor	Linus Power	15,346	60.82	+15.62
Liberal National	Michael Pucci	9,884	39.18	−15.62
Labor gain from Liberal National		Swing	+15.62	

2012 Queensland state election: Logan
Party	Candidate	Votes	%	±%
Liberal National	Michael Pucci	10,388	41.01	+9.34
Labor	Linus Power	8,431	33.29	−23.44
Katter's Australian	Tony Karamatic	3,196	12.62	+12.62
Independent	Mike Kelly	1,559	6.16	+6.16
Greens	Julian Hinton	1,362	5.38	−3.12
One Nation	Troy Aggett	392	1.55	+1.55
Total formal votes		25,328	96.63	−0.31
Informal votes		882	3.37	+0.31
Turnout		26,210	91.28	−0.14
Two-party-preferred result
Liberal National	Michael Pucci	11,801	54.80	+18.73
Labor	Linus Power	9,732	45.20	−18.73
Liberal National gain from Labor		Swing	+18.73	

=== Elections in the 2000s ===
2009 Queensland state election: Logan
Party	Candidate	Votes	%	±%
Labor	John Mickel	14,184	56.7	−4.8
Liberal National	Tristan McLindon	7,917	31.7	+8.1
Greens	James Brown	2,124	8.5	−0.8
DS4SEQ	Jenny Gear	777	3.1	+3.1
Total formal votes		25,002	96.5	
Informal votes		790	3.5	
Turnout		25,792	91.4	
Two-party-preferred result
Labor	John Mickel	14,982	63.9	−7.2
Liberal National	Tristan McLindon	8,453	36.1	+7.2
Labor hold		Swing	−7.2	

2006 Queensland state election: Logan
Party	Candidate	Votes	%	±%
Labor	John Mickel	15,456	63.9	+0.1
National	Belinda Goodwin	5,054	20.9	−3.6
Greens	Jessica Brown	2,174	9.0	+0.2
Family First	Robert Prinzen-Wood	1,521	6.3	+6.3
Total formal votes		24,205	96.9	−0.0
Informal votes		771	3.1	+0.0
Turnout		24,976	90.8	−0.8
Two-party-preferred result
Labor	John Mickel	16,508	73.9	+2.7
National	Belinda Goodwin	5,829	26.1	−2.7
Labor hold		Swing	+2.7	

2004 Queensland state election: Logan
Party	Candidate	Votes	%	±%
Labor	John Mickel	15,114	63.8	−8.5
National	Joy Drescher	5,799	24.5	−3.2
Greens	Eileen Brown	2,083	8.8	+8.8
Independent	Ron Frood	699	2.9	+2.9
Total formal votes		23,695	96.9	+2.5
Informal votes		746	3.1	−2.5
Turnout		24,441	91.6	−1.0
Two-party-preferred result
Labor	John Mickel	15,733	71.2	−1.1
National	Joy Drescher	6,349	28.8	+1.1
Labor hold		Swing	−1.1	

2001 Queensland state election: Logan
Party	Candidate	Votes	%	±%
Labor	John Mickel	15,645	72.3	+25.6
National	Joy Drescher	6,001	27.7	+10.2
Total formal votes		21,646	94.4	
Informal votes		1,275	5.6	
Turnout		22,921	92.6	
Labor hold		Swing	+10.4	

=== Elections in the 1990s ===
1998 Queensland state election: Logan
Party	Candidate	Votes	%	±%
Labor	John Mickel	12,353	49.0	−17.9
One Nation	Jan Dawson	7,202	28.6	+28.6
National	James Lister	3,695	14.7	−18.4
Independent	Russell Leneham	1,441	5.7	+5.7
Democrats	Alan Dickson	495	2.0	+2.0
Total formal votes		25,186	97.8	+0.6
Informal votes		563	2.2	−0.6
Turnout		25,749	92.9	+2.0
Two-candidate-preferred result
Labor	John Mickel	13,903	58.4	−8.5
One Nation	Jan Dawson	9,895	41.6	+41.6
Labor hold		Swing	−8.5	

1995 Queensland state election: Logan
Party	Candidate	Votes	%	±%
Labor	Wayne Goss	14,945	66.9	−2.1
National	Gordon Ritter	7,389	33.1	+20.0
Total formal votes		22,334	97.2	+0.1
Informal votes		635	2.8	−0.1
Turnout		22,969	90.9	
Labor hold		Swing	−8.4	

1992 Queensland state election: Logan
Party	Candidate	Votes	%	±%
Labor	Wayne Goss	14,467	69.1	+2.6
National	Gordon Ritter	2,751	13.1	+0.6
Liberal	Susie Gilbert	2,316	11.1	−9.1
Independent	Russell Leneham	1,413	6.7	+6.7
Total formal votes		20,947	97.2	
Informal votes		611	2.8	
Turnout		21,558	91.6	
Two-party-preferred result
Labor	Wayne Goss	15,206	75.3	+7.6
National	Gordon Ritter	4,978	24.7	+24.7
Labor hold		Swing	+7.6	

=== Elections in the 1980s ===
1989 Queensland state election: Logan
Party	Candidate	Votes	%	±%
Labor	Wayne Goss	16,836	67.3	+15.6
Liberal	Peter Carroll	5,024	20.1	+5.4
National	Wayne Robertson	3,159	12.6	−19.6
Total formal votes		25,019	95.6	−1.8
Informal votes		1,142	4.4	+1.8
Turnout		26,161	89.6	+1.1
Two-party-preferred result
Labor	Wayne Goss	17,063	68.2	+11.4
Liberal	Peter Carroll	7,956	31.8	+31.8
Labor hold		Swing	+11.4	

1986 Queensland state election: Logan
Party	Candidate	Votes	%	±%
Labor	Wayne Goss	9,693	51.7	
National	Wendy Howard	6,038	32.2	
Liberal	Allen Johnstone	2,746	14.7	
Socialist	Heather Haub	258	1.4	
Total formal votes		18,735	97.4	
Informal votes		509	2.6	
Turnout		19,244	88.5	
Two-party-preferred result
Labor	Wayne Goss	10,641	56.8	+5.5
National	Wendy Howard	8,094	43.2	−5.5
Labor hold		Swing	+5.5	

=== Elections in the 1960s ===
1969 Queensland state election: Logan
Party	Candidate	Votes	%	±%
Labor	Ted Baldwin	6,997	49.2	+12.0
Country	Dick Wood	6,192	43.5	+11.8
Queensland Labor	Michael Scragg	1,043	7.3	+5.5
Total formal votes		14,232	96.9	+0.1
Informal votes		454	3.1	−0.1
Turnout		14,686	90.2	−3.2
Two-party-preferred result
Labor	Ted Baldwin	7,338	51.6	+4.8
Country	Dick Wood	6,894	48.4	−4.8
Labor gain from Country		Swing	+4.8	

1966 Queensland state election: Logan
Party	Candidate	Votes	%	±%
Labor	William Ware	4,129	37.2	−1.0
Country	Dick Wood	3,516	31.7	−26.5
Liberal	Francis Dennis	2,199	19.8	+19.8
Independent	Laurence Storey	926	8.3	+8.3
Queensland Labor	Maurice Sheehan	197	1.8	−1.8
Social Credit	Paul Kenealy	135	1.2	+1.2
Total formal votes		11,102	96.8	−1.4
Informal votes		362	3.2	+1.4
Turnout		11,464	93.4	−0.2
Two-party-preferred result
Country	Dick Wood	5,903	53.2	−8.0
Labor	William Ware	5,199	46.8	+8.0
Country hold		Swing	−8.0	

1963 Queensland state election: Logan
Party	Candidate	Votes	%	±%
Country	Robert Harrison	5,733	58.2	−3.1
Labor	William Ware	3,767	38.2	−0.5
Queensland Labor	Frank Andrews	356	3.6	+3.6
Total formal votes		9,856	98.2	+0.2
Informal votes		180	1.8	−0.2
Turnout		10,036	93.6	+1.5
Two-party-preferred result
Country	Robert Harrison	6,033	61.2	
Labor	William Ware	3,823	38.8	
Country hold		Swing	N/A	

1960 Queensland state election: Logan
Party	Candidate	Votes	%	±%
Country	Robert Harrison	5,404	61.3	
Labor	Vincent Sheppard	3,413	38.7	
Total formal votes		8,817	98.0	
Informal votes		183	2.0	
Turnout		9,000	92.1	
Country win		(new seat)		

=== Elections in the 1940s ===
1947 Queensland state election: Logan
Party	Candidate	Votes	%	±%
People's Party	Thomas Hiley	10,034	60.7	+8.0
Labor	Ferdinand Scholl	6,589	39.3	−8.0
Total formal votes		16,523	99.1	+0.3
Informal votes		145	0.9	−0.3
Turnout		16,668	93.3	+4.2
People's Party hold		Swing	+8.0	

1944 Queensland state election: Logan
Party	Candidate	Votes	%	±%
People's Party	Thomas Hiley	7,434	52.7	+7.7
Labor	John Brown	6,680	47.3	−7.7
Total formal votes		14,114	98.8	+0.7
Informal votes		165	1.2	−0.7
Turnout		14,279	89.1	−2.7
People's Party gain from Labor		Swing	+7.7	

1941 Queensland state election: Logan
Party	Candidate	Votes	%	±%
Labor	John Brown	6,848	55.0	+5.4
United Australia	Albert Pro-Copis	5,602	45.0	+12.8
Total formal votes		12,450	98.1	−0.2
Informal votes		240	1.9	+0.2
Turnout		12,690	91.8	−2.4
Labor hold		Swing	−0.8	

=== Elections in the 1930s ===
1938 Queensland state election: Logan
Party	Candidate	Votes	%	±%
Labor	John Brown	5,320	49.6	−11.4
United Australia	Allan Trotter	3,451	32.2	−6.8
Protestant Labour	John Becconsall	1,746	16.3	+16.3
Independent	Mary DeMattos	209	2.0	+2.0
Total formal votes		10,726	98.3	+0.2
Informal votes		182	1.7	−0.2
Turnout		10,908	94.2	−0.2
Two-party-preferred result
Labor	John Brown	4,671	55.8	−5.2
United Australia	Allan Trotter	4,494	44.2	+5.2
Labor hold		Swing	−5.2	

1935 Queensland state election: Logan
Party	Candidate	Votes	%	±%
Labor	John Brown	5,640	61.0	
CPNP	Reginald King	3,601	39.0	
Total formal votes		9,241	98.1	
Informal votes		183	1.9	
Turnout		9,424	94.4	
Labor gain from CPNP		Swing		

1932 Queensland state election: Logan
Party	Candidate	Votes	%	±%
CPNP	Reginald King	4,301	50.1	
Labor	Joe Cranitch	4,087	47.6	
Independent Labor	Patrick Coffey	191	2.2	
Total formal votes		8,579	99.0	
Informal votes		84	1.0	
Turnout		8,663	94.7	
CPNP hold		Swing		

- Preferences were not distributed.

=== Elections in the 1920s ===
1929 Queensland state election: Logan
Party	Candidate	Votes	%	±%
CPNP	Reginald King	7,418	64.8	+11.2
Labor	Richard Leggat	4,029	35.2	−11.2
Total formal votes		11,447	98.9	−0.3
Informal votes		129	1.1	+0.3
Turnout		11,576		
CPNP hold		Swing	+11.2	

1926 Queensland state election: Logan
Party	Candidate	Votes	%	±%
CPNP	Reginald King	4,970	53.6	+1.0
Labor	Richard Brown	4,304	46.4	−1.0
Total formal votes		9,274	99.2	+0.3
Informal votes		71	0.8	−0.3
Turnout		9,345	93.6	+5.4
CPNP hold		Swing	+1.0	

1923 Queensland state election: Logan
Party	Candidate	Votes	%	±%
United	Reginald King	3,717	52.6	+15.4
Labor	Thomas Jones	3,345	47.4	+7.5
Total formal votes		7,062	98.9	−0.1
Informal votes		77	1.1	+0.1
Turnout		7,139	88.2	+7.6
United hold		Swing	−4.9	

1920 Queensland state election: Logan
Party	Candidate	Votes	%	±%
Labor	Richard Brown	2,648	39.9	−13.2
National	Reginald King	2,466	37.2	−9.7
Country	Alfred James	1,517	22.9	+22.9
Total formal votes		6,631	99.0	+0.3
Informal votes		70	1.0	−0.3
Turnout		6,701	78.6	−7.8
Two-party-preferred result
National	Reginald King	3,674	57.5	+10.6
Labor	Richard Brown	2,720	42.5	−10.6
National gain from Labor		Swing	+10.6	

=== Elections in the 1910s ===
1918 Queensland state election: Logan
Party	Candidate	Votes	%	±%
Labor	Alfred James	3,044	53.1	+9.2
National	Reginald King	2,688	46.9	−9.2
Total formal votes		5,732	98.7	−0.4
Informal votes		76	1.3	+0.4
Turnout		5,808	86.4	−3.2
Labor gain from National		Swing	+9.2	

1915 Queensland state election: Logan
Party	Candidate	Votes	%	±%
Liberal	James Stodart	2,481	56.1	−12.6
Labor	Percy Crooke	1,941	43.9	+12.6
Total formal votes		4,422	99.1	+0.2
Informal votes		41	0.9	−0.2
Turnout		4,463	89.6	+12.0
Liberal hold		Swing	−12.6	

1912 Queensland state election: Logan
Party	Candidate	Votes	%	±%
Liberal	James Stodart	2,127	68.7	
Labor	Wolfgang Arnold	971	31.3	
Total formal votes		3,098	98.9	
Informal votes		34	1.1	
Turnout		3,132	77.6	
Liberal hold		Swing		
