= Members of the Queensland Legislative Assembly, 1873–1878 =

This is a list of members of the 7th Legislative Assembly of Queensland from 1873 to 1878, as elected at the 1873 colonial elections held between 4 November 1873 and 4 December 1873 (due to problems of distance and communications, it was not possible to hold the elections on a single day).

Name	Electorate	Term in office
Francis Amhurst^{[10]}^{[26]}	Bowen	1875–1877; 1878–1881
William Bailey	Wide Bay	1873–1888
Frank Beattie^{[3]}	Fortitude Valley	1874–1878; 1879–1886
Joshua Peter Bell	Dalby	1862–1879
Henry Beor^{[26]}	Bowen	1877–1880
Adam Black ^{[9]}^{[12]}	Logan	1875
Charles Hardie Buzacott ^{[30]}	Rockhampton	1873–1877
Oscar de Satge^{[25]}	Normanby	1869–1870; 1870–1872; 1873–1877; 1881–1882
James Dickson	Enoggera	1873–1888; 1892–1901
John Douglas^{[8]}	Maryborough	1863–1866; 1867–1868; 1875–1880
George Edmondstone^{[29]}	Wickham	1860–1867; 1869–1877
Thomas Henry FitzGerald ^{[10]}	Bowen	1867–1869; 1873–1875
James Foote	West Moreton	1873–1878; 1880–1888; 1892–1893
George Fox^{[25]}	Normanby	1877–1878; 1901–1914
Simon Fraser	Bundamba	1868–1870; 1873–1878; 1880–1888
William Fryar ^{[28]}	East Moreton	1873–1877
James Garrick^{[28]}	East Moreton	1867–1868; 1877–1883
Charles Graham ^{[16]}	Clermont	1872–1876
William Graham^{[7]}	Darling Downs	1875–1878
Samuel Griffith	Oxley	1872–1893
George Grimes^{[23]}	Bulimba	1876–1878
William Henry Groom	Toowoomba	1862–1901
Charles Haly^{[15]}	Leichhardt	1860–1863; 1865–1867; 1869–1871; 1876–1878
William Hemmant ^{[20]}	Bulimba	1871–1876
Albert John Hockings^{[29]}	Wickham	1877–1878
William Hodgkinson^{[13]}	Burke	1873–1875; 1888–1893
Francis Ivory	Burnett	1873–1878
James Johnston ^{[20]}^{[23]}	Bulimba	1876
James Kidgell^{[24]}	Gympie	1877–1878
Henry Edward King^{[6]}	Ravenswood	1870–1871; 1871–1873; 1874–1883
Richard Ash Kingsford^{[11]}	South Brisbane	1875–1883
Charles Lilley ^{[3]}	Fortitude Valley	1860–1873
Robert Lord ^{[24]}	Gympie	1873–1877
Jacob Low^{[4]}	Balonne	1874–1883
Arthur Macalister ^{[19]}	Ipswich	1860–1871; 1872–1876
Edward MacDevitt ^{[6]}	Ravenswood	1870–1874
Peter MacDonald	Blackall	1873–1878
John MacFarlane^{[32]}	Ipswich	1878–1894
John MacFarlane^{[30]}	Rockhampton	1877–1878; 1879–1880
Thomas McIlwraith	Maranoa	1870–1871; 1873–1886; 1888–1896
Peter McLean^{[17]}	Logan	1876–1883
John Murtagh Macrossan	Kennedy	1873–1878; 1879–1891
William Miles^{[1]}^{[14]}^{[22]}	Carnarvon; Northern Downs	1864–1873; 1874–1875; 1876–1887
Boyd Dunlop Morehead	Mitchell	1871–1880; 1883–1896
Berkeley Basil Moreton ^{[8]}	Maryborough	1870–1871; 1873–1875; 1883–1888
James Morgan	Warwick	1870–1871; 1873–1878
William Edward Murphy^{[18]}	Cook	1876–1878
Philip Nind ^{[5]}^{[9]}	Logan	1873–1875
Patrick O'Sullivan^{[21]}	Burke	1860–1863; 1867–1868; 1876–1883; 1888–1893
Arthur Hunter Palmer	Port Curtis	1866–1881
James Augustus Parker ^{[13]}^{[21]}	Burke	1875–1876
Edward Wilmot Pechey ^{[27]}	Aubigny	1873–1877
Patrick Perkins^{[27]}	Aubigny	1877–1884; 1888–1893
de Burgh Fitzpatrick Persse^{[33]}	Fassifern	1878–1883
John Pettigrew	Stanley	1873–1878
Ratcliffe Pring^{[1]}^{[31]}	Carnarvon; Brisbane City	1860–1862; 1863–1866; 1867–1872; 1873–1874; 1878–1879
Edmund Royds ^{[15]}	Leichhardt	1864–1868; 1872–1875
John Scott	Springsure	1868; 1870–1888
Walter Jervoise Scott	Mulgrave	1871–1878
Frederick Shaw ^{[12]}^{[17]}	Logan	1875–1876
Thomas Blacket Stephens ^{[11]}	South Brisbane	1863–1875
John Stevenson^{[16]}	Clermont	1876–1893
Robert Stewart^{[31]}	Brisbane City	1873–1878
John Malbon Thompson	Bremer	1868–1881
George Thorn^{[2]}^{[19]}^{[32]}	Fassifern; Ipswich	1867–1874; 1876–1878; 1879–1883; 1887–1888; 1893–1902
Henry Thorn ^{[22]}	Northern Downs	1867–1868; 1873–1876
John Thorn^{[2]}^{[33]}	Fassifern	1874–1878
John Tyrel^{[14]}	Carnarvon	1876–1883
Adam Walker ^{[4]}	Balonne	1873–1874
William Henry Walsh	Warrego	1865–1878
Edward Wienholt ^{[7]}	Darling Downs	1870–1875

== See also ==
- Premier:

Arthur Hunter Palmer (1870–1874)
Arthur Macalister (1874–1876)
George Thorn (1876–1877)
John Douglas (1877–1879)

== Notes ==
^{1} On 8 January 1874, Ratcliffe Pring, member for Carnarvon, was appointed to the Macalister Ministry as Attorney-General. He therefore was required to resign his seat and stand for a ministerial by-election. He lost the seat to William Miles at the resulting by-election on 20 January 1874.
^{2} On 8 January 1874, George Thorn, member for Fassifern, was appointed to the Queensland Legislative Council. His brother John Thorn won the resulting by-election on 24 January 1874.
^{3} On 14 February 1874, Charles Lilley, member for Fortitude Valley, resigned. Frank Beattie won the resulting by-election on 25 February 1874.
^{4} The election of Adam Walker, the member for Balonne, was voided on 27 May 1874, and Jacob Low was appointed in his place.
^{5} The election of Philip Nind, the member for Logan, was voided on 27 May 1874. He retained his seat at the resulting by-election on 8 June 1874.
^{6} On 13 November 1874, Edward MacDevitt, member for Ravenswood, resigned. Henry Edward King won the resulting by-election on 9 December 1874.
^{7} On 1 February 1875, Edward Wienholt, member for Darling Downs, resigned. William Graham won the resulting by-election on 23 March 1875.
^{8} On 16 March 1875, Berkeley Basil Moreton, member for Maryborough, resigned. John Douglas won the resulting by-election on 2 April 1875.
^{9} On 3 April 1875, Philip Nind, member for Logan, resigned. Adam Black won the resulting by-election on 16 April 1875.
^{10} On 5 May 1875, Thomas Henry FitzGerald, member for Bowen, resigned. Francis Amhurst won the resulting by-election on 14 May 1975.
^{11} On 13 May 1875, Thomas Blacket Stephens, member for South Brisbane, resigned. Richard Ash Kingsford won the resulting by-election on 26 May 1875, defeating the other nominee Ratcliffe Pring.
^{12} On 3 October 1875, Adam Black, member for Logan, resigned. Frederick Shaw won the resulting by-election on 19 October 1875.
^{13} On 13 September 1875, William Hodgkinson, member for Burke, resigned. James Augustus Parker won the resulting by-election on 26 October 1875.
^{14} On 14 October 1875, William Miles, member for Carnarvon, resigned. John Tyrel won the resulting by-election on 8 January 1876.
^{15} On 8 December 1875, Edmund Royds, member for Leichhardt, resigned. Charles Haly won the resulting by-election on 12 January 1876.
^{16} On 4 January 1876, Charles Graham, member for Clermont, resigned. John Stevenson won the resulting by-election on 4 February 1876.
^{17} On 12 April 1876, Frederick Shaw, member for Logan, resigned. Peter McLean won the resulting by-election on 9 May 1876.
^{18} The Additional Members Act 1875 created the new seat of Cook. On 1 June 1876, William Edward Murphy became its first member at a special election.
^{19} On 14 June 1876, Arthur Macalister, member for Ipswich, resigned. George Thorn won the resulting by-election on 20 June 1876.
^{20} On 26 June 1876, William Hemmant, member for Bulimba, resigned. James Johnston won the resulting by-election on 7 July 1876.
^{21} On 21 June 1876, James Augustus Parker, member for Burke, resigned. Patrick O'Sullivan won the resulting by-election on 22 August 1876.
^{22} On 30 October 1876, Henry Thorn, member for Northern Downs, resigned. William Miles won the resulting by-election on 14 November 1876.
^{23} On 7 November 1876, James Johnston, member for Bulimba, died. George Grimes won the resulting by-election on 18 November 1876.
^{24} On 9 March 1877, Robert Lord, member for Gympie, resigned. James Kidgell won the resulting by-election on 23 March 1877.
^{25} On 20 March 1877, Oscar de Satge, member for Normanby, resigned. George Fox won the resulting by-election on 19 April 1877.
^{26} On 24 March 1877, Francis Amhurst, member for Bowen, resigned. Henry Beor won the resulting by-election on 23 April 1877.
^{27} On 9 April 1877, Edward Wilmot Pechey, member for Aubigny, resigned. Patrick Perkins won the resulting by-election on 1 May 1877.
^{28} On 24 April 1877, William Fryar, member for East Moreton, resigned. James Garrick won the resulting by-election on 10 May 1877.
^{29} On 28 April 1877, George Edmondstone, member for Wickham, resigned. Albert John Hockings won the resulting by-election on 12 May 1877.
^{30} On 26 October 1877, Charles Hardie Buzacott, member for Rockhampton, resigned. John MacFarlane won the resulting by-election on 20 November 1877.
^{31} On 1 February 1878, Robert Stewart, member for Brisbane City, resigned. Ratcliffe Pring won the resulting by-election on 12 February 1878.
^{32} On 12 February 1878, George Thorn, member for Ipswich, resigned. John MacFarlane won the resulting by-election on 7 March 1878.
^{33} On 12 March 1878, John Thorn, member for Fassifern, resigned. de Burgh Fitzpatrick Persse won the resulting by-election on 9 April 1878.
