= Electoral results for the district of Nicklin =

It also describes the people contesting the elections

This is a list of electoral results for the electoral district of Nicklin in Queensland state elections.

== Members for Nicklin ==
Member	Party	Term
Brian Austin	National	1986–1989
Bob King	Liberal	1989–1990
Neil Turner	National	1990–1998
Peter Wellington	Independent	1998–2017
Marty Hunt	Liberal National	2017–2020
Robert Skelton	Labor	2020–2024
Marty Hunt	Liberal National	2024–present

^{1} Election declared void by the Court of Disputed Returns

== Election results ==
=== Elections in the 2020s ===
2024 Queensland state election: Nicklin
Party	Candidate	Votes	%	±%
Liberal National	Marty Hunt	12,379	37.84	−0.06
Labor	Robert Skelton	9,745	29.79	−4.71
Greens	Sue Etheridge	3,292	10.06	−2.44
Legalise Cannabis	Melody Lindsay	2,506	7.66	+7.66
One Nation	Rebecca McCosker	2,401	7.34	+0.94
Family First	Phillip Eschler	1,519	4.64	+4.64
Independent	Steve Dickson	875	2.67	+2.67
Total formal votes		32,717	95.22	
Informal votes		1,644	4.78	
Turnout		34,361	87.70	
Two-party-preferred result
Liberal National	Marty Hunt	17,240	52.69	+2.79
Labor	Robert Skelton	15,477	47.31	−2.79
Liberal National gain from Labor		Swing	+2.79	

2020 Queensland state election: Nicklin
Party	Candidate	Votes	%	±%
Liberal National	Marty Hunt	11,255	37.96	+6.26
Labor	Robert Skelton	10,214	34.45	+9.29
Greens	Sue Etheridge	3,702	12.49	+0.10
One Nation	Michael Cardinal	1,900	6.41	−14.61
Independent	Riccardo Bosi	1,387	4.68	+4.68
Informed Medical Options	Allona Lahn	1,190	4.01	+4.01
Total formal votes		29,648	96.30	+0.74
Informal votes		1,138	3.70	−0.74
Turnout		30,786	87.94	+0.10
Two-party-preferred result
Labor	Robert Skelton	14,866	50.14	+5.42
Liberal National	Marty Hunt	14,782	49.86	−5.42
Labor gain from Liberal National		Swing	+5.42	

=== Elections in the 2010s ===
2017 Queensland state election: Nicklin
Party	Candidate	Votes	%	±%
Liberal National	Marty Hunt	8,732	31.7	−1.4
Labor	Justin Raethel	6,931	25.2	+8.3
One Nation	Steven Ford	5,790	21.0	+21.0
Greens	Mick Tyrrell	3,413	12.4	+2.8
Consumer Rights	Jeffrey Hodges	1,003	3.6	+3.6
Independent	Tony R. Moore	972	3.5	+3.5
Independent	Rachel Radic	705	2.6	+2.6
Total formal votes		27,546	95.6	−2.3
Informal votes		1,278	4.4	+2.3
Turnout		28,824	87.8	+0.3
Two-party-preferred result
Liberal National	Marty Hunt	15,227	55.3	+1.6
Labor	Justin Raethel	12,319	44.7	−1.6
Liberal National gain from Independent		Swing	+1.6	

2015 Queensland state election: Nicklin
Party	Candidate	Votes	%	±%
Independent	Peter Wellington	13,237	43.79	+4.65
Liberal National	Matt Trace	9,379	31.03	−4.84
Labor	Justin Raethel	4,941	16.34	+8.48
Greens	Julie Doolan	2,673	8.84	+1.77
Total formal votes		30,230	97.78	−0.49
Informal votes		686	2.22	+0.49
Turnout		30,916	90.59	−0.26
Two-candidate-preferred result
Independent	Peter Wellington	18,058	64.89	+10.01
Liberal National	Matt Trace	9,770	35.11	−10.01
Independent hold		Swing	+10.01	

2012 Queensland state election: Nicklin
Party	Candidate	Votes	%	±%
Independent	Peter Wellington	10,725	39.14	−10.77
Liberal National	John Connolly	9,829	35.87	+7.59
Labor	Luke Moore	2,154	7.86	−7.89
Katter's Australian	Matthew Smith	2,075	7.57	+7.57
Greens	John Law	1,937	7.07	+0.51
Family First	Cathy Turner	684	2.50	+2.50
Total formal votes		27,404	98.28	−0.22
Informal votes		481	1.72	+0.22
Turnout		27,885	90.85	−0.07
Two-candidate-preferred result
Independent	Peter Wellington	13,186	54.88	−11.43
Liberal National	John Connolly	10,841	45.12	+11.43
Independent hold		Swing	−11.43	

=== Elections in the 2000s ===
2009 Queensland state election: Nicklin
Party	Candidate	Votes	%	±%
Independent	Peter Wellington	13,243	49.9	−1.9
Liberal National	Steve Morrison	7,503	28.3	+3.9
Labor	Peter Baulch	4,046	15.2	+1.7
Greens	Garry Claridge	1,740	6.6	−1.4
Total formal votes		26,532	98.4	
Informal votes		405	1.6	
Turnout		26,937	90.9	
Two-candidate-preferred result
Independent	Peter Wellington	15,588	66.3	−8.2
Liberal National	Steve Morrison	7,921	33.7	+8.2
Independent hold		Swing	−8.2	

2006 Queensland state election: Nicklin
Party	Candidate	Votes	%	±%
Independent	Peter Wellington	16,067	59.7	+0.2
National	Steve Morrison	5,585	20.7	+6.4
Labor	Matt Rocks	3,429	12.7	−3.0
Greens	Katherine Webb	1,836	6.8	+1.6
Total formal votes		26,917	98.5	−0.1
Informal votes		415	1.5	+0.1
Turnout		27,332	90.5	−1.1
Two-candidate-preferred result
Independent	Peter Wellington	18,097	75.1	−4.5
National	Steve Morrison	6,007	24.9	+24.9
Independent hold		Swing	−4.5	

2004 Queensland state election: Nicklin
Party	Candidate	Votes	%	±%
Independent	Peter Wellington	15,617	59.5	+13.2
Labor	Linda Hanson	4,131	15.7	−1.2
National	Leo Woodward	3,762	14.3	+6.5
Greens	Robert Winny	1,373	5.2	+1.5
One Nation	Clinton Booth	1,354	5.2	−10.8
Total formal votes		26,237	98.6	−0.2
Informal votes		362	1.4	+0.2
Turnout		26,599	91.6	−1.1
Two-candidate-preferred result
Independent	Peter Wellington	18,447	79.6	+6.2
Labor	Linda Hanson	4,741	20.4	+20.4
Independent hold		Swing	+6.2	

2001 Queensland state election: Nicklin
Party	Candidate	Votes	%	±%
Independent	Peter Wellington	11,554	46.3	+22.3
Labor	Philomena Boman	4,224	16.9	−1.9
One Nation	Clinton Booth	3,992	16.0	−7.6
Liberal	Dot Whittington	2,305	9.2	+6.9
National	Warren Gardiner	1,941	7.8	−18.7
Greens	John Fitzgerald	932	3.7	+1.4
Total formal votes		24,948	98.8	
Informal votes		304	1.2	
Turnout		25,252	92.7	
Two-candidate-preferred result
Independent	Peter Wellington	15,114	73.4	+14.9
One Nation	Clinton Booth	5,469	26.6	+26.6
Independent hold		Swing	+14.9	

=== Elections in the 1990s ===
1998 Queensland state election: Nicklin
Party	Candidate	Votes	%	±%
National	Neil Turner	6,878	26.9	−30.9
Independent	Peter Wellington	6,562	25.6	+25.6
One Nation	Santo Ferraro	6,039	23.6	+23.6
Labor	Coleen Giles	5,426	21.2	−10.5
Democrats	Geoff Armstrong	695	2.7	−7.8
Total formal votes		25,600	98.8	+0.4
Informal votes		323	1.2	−0.4
Turnout		25,923	92.2	+1.5
Two-candidate-preferred result
Independent	Peter Wellington	12,159	55.7	+55.7
National	Neil Turner	9,657	44.3	−18.6
Independent gain from National		Swing	+55.7	

1995 Queensland state election: Nicklin
Party	Candidate	Votes	%	±%
National	Neil Turner	13,356	57.8	+30.2
Labor	Coleen Giles	7,328	31.7	+3.6
Democrats	Kirsten Kirk	2,442	10.6	+10.6
Total formal votes		23,126	98.4	+0.2
Informal votes		387	1.6	−0.2
Turnout		23,513	90.7	
Two-party-preferred result
National	Neil Turner	14,244	62.8	+5.0
Labor	Coleen Giles	8,422	37.2	−5.0
National hold		Swing	+5.0	

1992 Queensland state election: Nicklin
Party	Candidate	Votes	%	±%
Labor	Coleen Giles	6,011	28.1	−10.8
National	Neil Turner	5,904	27.6	−0.8
Liberal	Bob King	4,742	22.2	+1.6
Independent	Hermann Schwabe	4,734	22.1	+22.1
Total formal votes		21,391	98.2	
Informal votes		396	1.8	
Turnout		21,787	91.4	
Two-party-preferred result
National	Neil Turner	11,217	57.9	+3.9
Labor	Coleen Giles	8,163	42.1	−3.9
National hold		Swing	+3.9	

Court of Disputed Returns decision on Nicklin, 21 November 1990
Party	Candidate	Votes	%	±%
Labor	Ian Matthews	9,105	37.47	−0.04
National	Neil Turner	5,774	23.80	+0.02
Liberal	Bob King	5,584	23.02	−0.06
Independent	Keith Bartholomew	2,488	10.26	0.00
Independent	Cecil Hamley	594	2.45	+0.01
Conservative	Judith Jackson	384	1.58	0.00
Democrats	Bob Borsellino	336	1.39	0.00
Total formal votes		24,259	97.84	−0.15
Informal votes		792	3.16	+0.15
Turnout		25,051	90.34	0.00
Two-party-preferred result
National	Neil Turner	12,912	53.23	+53.23
Labor	Ian Matthews	11,347	46.77	+5.06
National gain from Liberal		Swing	+53.23	

^{1} The court declared the 1989 election result void. Instead of a by-election, the ballot papers were recounted and the National Party candidate was declared the winner on the preference count.

=== Elections in the 1980s ===
1989 Queensland state election: Nicklin
Party	Candidate	Votes	%	±%
Labor	Ian Matthews	9,105	37.5	+8.7
National	Neil Turner	5,779	23.8	−17.4
Liberal	Bob King	5,607	23.1	+4.3
Independent	Keith Bartholomew	2,492	10.3	+10.3
Independent	Cecil Hamley	594	2.4	+2.4
Conservative	Judith Jackson	384	1.6	+1.6
Democrats	Bob Borsellino	337	1.4	−2.8
Total formal votes		24,298	97.0	−1.5
Informal votes		754	3.0	+1.5
Turnout		25,052	90.3	+0.3
Two-party-preferred result
Liberal	Bob King	14,164	58.3	+58.3
Labor	Ian Matthews	10,134	41.7	+2.6
Liberal gain from National		Swing	+58.3	

1986 Queensland state election: Nicklin
Party	Candidate	Votes	%	±%
National	Brian Austin	9,745	48.2	
Labor	Ian Matthews	5,833	28.8	
Liberal	Geoffrey Malcolm	3,807	18.8	
Democrats	Barbara Camplin	850	4.2	
Total formal votes		20,235	98.5	
Informal votes		312	1.5	
Turnout		20,547	90.0	
Two-party-preferred result
National	Brian Austin	12,329	60.9	−5.5
Labor	Ian Matthews	7,906	39.1	+5.5
National hold		Swing	−5.5	
