= 1909 Bulloo state by-election =

Australian by-election in 1909

The 1909 Bulloo state by-election was a by-election held on 27 March 1909 for the Queensland Legislative Assembly seat of Bulloo, based in the remote south western part of the state.

The by-election was triggered by the death of Ministerial member John Leahy on 20 January 1909. Leahy had held the seat since 1893, five years after its creation. He was a minister in the First Philp Ministry from 1901 until 1903, and at the time of his death was the Legislative Assembly.

The seat included the towns of Thargomindah, Birdsville, Eromanga, Eulo, Hungerford and Windorah.

== Timeline ==
Date	Event
20 January 1909	John Leahy died, vacating the seat of Bulloo.
12 February 1909	Writs were issued by the Governor of Queensland to proceed with a by-election.
12 March 1909	Close of nominations and draw of ballot papers.
27 March 1909	Polling day, between the hours of 8am and 5pm.
17 April 1909	The writ was returned and the results formally declared.

== Results ==
Frank Allen won the seat for the Labour Party.

Bulloo state by-election, 1909
Party	Candidate	Votes	%	±%
Labor	Frank Allen	358	56.28	+15.66
Ministerialist	John Cordner	278	43.71	–15.66
Total formal votes		636	99.69	+1.51
Informal votes		2	0.31	–1.51
Turnout		638	73.67	+6.64
Labor gain from Ministerialist		Swing	+15.66	
