= 1920 in Australian literature =

This article presents a list of the historical events and publications of Australian literature during 1920.

== Books ==
- J. H. M. Abbott — Castle Vane: A Romance of Bushranging on the Upper Hunter in the Olden Days
- Arthur H. Adams — The Australians: A Novel
- Roy Bridges — The Fenceless Ranges
- Mary Grant Bruce — Dick Lester of Kurrajong
- Bernard Cronin — The Timber Wolves
- Isabel Dick — The Veil of Discretion
- Mary Gaunt — The Surrender and Other Happenings
- Nat Gould
  - A Chestnut Champion
  - The Silver Star
  - The Sweep Winner
- Jack McLaren — The Savagery of Margaret Nestor: A Tale of Northern Queensland
- Dowell O'Reilly – Five Corners
- Vance Palmer — The Shantykeeper's Daughter
- Arthur J. Rees — The Hand in the Dark
- Lilian Turner — Rachel

== Poetry ==
- Martin Boyd — Retrospect: Poems
- James Hebblethwaite — The Poems of James Hebblethwaite
- Henry Kendall — The Poems of Henry Kendall
- Hugh McCrae — Columbine
- Dorothea Mackellar — "Dusk in the Domain"
- Furnley Maurice — Ways and Means: a poem and an argument
- Nina Murdoch — "The Camphor Laurel Tree"
- John Shaw Neilson
  - "The Eleventh Moon"
  - "Ride Him Away"
- Vance Palmer
  - The Camp
  - "Europe"
  - "The Farmer Remembers the Somme"
  - "These Are My People"
- Roderic Quinn — Poems
- Kenneth Slessor — "In Tyrrell's Bookshop"

== Short stories ==
- Henry Lawson — "Asking Dad"
- Dowell O'Reilly — "Crows"

== Children's and young adult fiction ==
- May Gibbs — Little Ragged Blossom: And More About Snugglepot and Cuddlepie
- Ethel Turner — Laughing Water

== Drama ==
- Randolph Bedford — The Boss Cockie
- Louis Esson — Dead Timber and Other Plays

== Births ==
A list, ordered by date of birth (and, if the date is either unspecified or repeated, ordered alphabetically by surname) of births in 1920 of Australian literary figures, authors of written works or literature-related individuals follows, including year of death.

- 8 June — Gwen Harwood, poet (died 1995)
- 18 June — Rosemary Dobson, poet (died (2012)
- 3 August — Max Fatchen, writer for children (died 2012)
- 1 September — Margaret Paice, children's writer and illustrator (died 2016)
- 3 November — Oodgeroo Noonuccal, poet and activist (died 1993)
- 16 November — Colin Thiele, writer for children (died 2006)

== Deaths ==
A list, ordered by date of death (and, if the date is either unspecified or repeated, ordered alphabetically by surname) of deaths in 1920 of Australian literary figures, authors of written works or literature-related individuals follows, including year of birth.

- 12 August — Louisa Lawson, poet (born 1848)

== See also ==
- 1920 in Australia
- 1920 in literature
- 1920 in poetry
- List of years in Australian literature
- List of years in literature
