= Richard Gardiner Casey =

Richard Gardiner Casey may refer to:

- Richard Casey (Queensland politician) (1846–1919), pastoralist, horse racing official
- Richard Casey, Baron Casey (1890–1976), Australian Governor-General
