= White Australia (play) =

1909 Australian play by Randolph Bedford

White Australia, or the Empty North
- Original language: English
- Written by: Randolph Bedford
- Subject: race
- Genre: melodrama

Premiere
- Date: June 26, 1909
- Place: Kings Theatre, Australia

White Australia, or the Empty North is a 1909 Australian play by Randolph Bedford. It was produced by William Anderson.

The play gained popularity and has recently seen a resurgence in interest due to its depiction of racist propaganda.

== Premise ==
The Japanese attempt to invade Australia, with help from some Northern Territory Aborigines and a white traitor, but are thwarted by a Northern Territory squatter. It ends with the Japanese war fleet being destroyed.

== See also ==
- Yellow Peril
