= Electoral district of Bulloo =

Former state electoral district of Queensland, Australia

Bulloo Queensland—Legislative Assembly
- State: Queensland
- Created: 1888
- Abolished: 1912
- Demographic: Rural
- Coordinates: 28°30′S 142°30′E

Bulloo was a Legislative Assembly electorate in the state of Queensland, Australia.

== History ==
Bulloo was created in 1888. It was located in far south-west Queensland. It was abolished in the 1910 redistribution (taking effect at the 1912 elections), being incorporated into the Electoral district of Warrego.

== Members ==
The following people were elected in the seat of Bulloo:

Member	Party	Term
John Donaldson	Ministerial	26 May 1888 – 25 Apr 1893
John Leahy	Independent/ Ministerial	25 Apr 1893 – 20 Jan 1909
Frank Allen	Labor	27 Mar 1909 – 27 Apr 1912

== See also ==
- Electoral districts of Queensland
- Members of the Queensland Legislative Assembly by year
- Category:Members of the Queensland Legislative Assembly by name
