= Robert Skelton (politician) =

Australian politician

Robert Skelton MP

Member of the Queensland Legislative Assembly for Nicklin
- In office 31 October 2020 – 26 October 2024
- Preceded by: Marty Hunt
- Succeeded by: Marty Hunt

Personal details
- Born: 11 March 1974 (age 52)
- Party: Labor
- Children: 3
- Website: www.robertskeltonmp.com.au

Robert Clinton James Skelton (born 11 March 1974) is an Australian politician. He was the Labor Party member for Nicklin in the Queensland Legislative Assembly between 2020 and 2024.

Before his election, Skelton worked for the Australian Defence Force in the Royal Australian Navy and Royal Australian Airforce before transferring to civilian life as a leading firefighter at Queensland airports.

Parliament of Queensland
Preceded by Marty Hunt	Member for Nicklin; 2020–2024	Succeeded by Marty Hunt
