= Bob King (Queensland politician) =

Australian politician

Member of the Queensland Legislative Assembly for Nicklin
- In office 2 December 1989 – 22 November 1990
- Preceded by: Brian Austin
- Succeeded by: Neil Turner

Personal details
- Born: Robert George King; 13 December 1938 Ayr, Queensland, Australia
- Died: 10 April 2025 (aged 86)
- Resting place: Mt. Gravatt cemetery, Brisbane.
- Party: Liberal Party
- Spouse: Helene Agnes King
- Children: Robert Sean King, Bretton Micheal King, Benjamin James King, Caroline Jane King.
- Occupation: Farmer, Car and Caravan dealership owner

Robert George "Bob" King (13 December 1938 – 10 April 2025) was a businessman and politician in Queensland, Australia. He was a Member of the Queensland Legislative Assembly.

== Early life ==
Bob King was born in Ayr, the son of John Leslie King, a radio dealer, and Thelma Annie. He attended Mackay state school and became a school teacher, then a primary producer with International Finance and Automotive Management.

== Politics ==
From 1985 he was deputy chairman of Maroochy Shire Council.

Originally a member of the National Party, he joined the Liberal Party and at the 1989 election was narrowly elected to the Queensland Legislative Assembly as the member for Nicklin. Following a challenge by the defeated National candidate, Neil Turner, a recount was held, which Turner won; King thus ceased to be a member on 22 November 1990. He unsuccessfully contested the seat again in the 1992 election.

Parliament of Queensland
Preceded by Brian Austin	Member for Nicklin; 1989–1990	Succeeded by Neil Turner
