= Marty Hunt =

Australian politician

Member of the Queensland Legislative Assembly for Nicklin
- Incumbent
- Assumed office 26 October 2024
- Preceded by: Robert Skelton
- In office 25 November 2017 – 6 October 2020
- Preceded by: Peter Wellington
- Succeeded by: Robert Skelton

Personal details
- Born: 12 February 1970 (age 56) Windsor, New South Wales
- Party: Liberal National
- Occupation: Police officer, politician

Martin Hunt (born 12 February 1970) is an Australian politician and former police officer who is the Liberal National Party member for Nicklin in the Queensland Legislative Assembly since 2024, having previously served from 2017 to 2020.

Prior to his election, Hunt was a Sergeant in the Queensland Police Service, assigned to the Sunshine Coast (Nambour) PCYC (Police-Citizens Youth Club).

Sworn in to the Queensland Police Service on 7 July 1989 after training 18 months as a Cadet, Hunt served 30 years as a Queensland Police Officer serving in Inala, Oxley District CIB, Sunshine Coast Child Abuse Unit and CPIU before being appointed officer in charge PCYC Sunshine Coast in May 2000.

Hunt made his inaugural speech on 20 March 2018 paying tribute to his family, police colleagues and volunteers. He described his catholic school upbringing, values instilled over time and passion for police mental health and improvements to the justice system. His inaugural speech can be viewed here

He was re-elected in the seat of Nicklin in the 2024 Queensland state election.

Parliament of Queensland
Preceded by Peter Wellington	Member for Nicklin; 2017–2020	Succeeded by Robert Skelton
