= Peter Wellington =

Australian politician

The Honourable Peter Wellington

38th Speaker of the Queensland Legislative Assembly
- In office 24 March 2015 – 25 November 2017
- Deputy: Di Farmer
- Preceded by: Fiona Simpson
- Succeeded by: Curtis Pitt

Member of the Queensland Parliament for Nicklin
- In office 13 June 1998 – 25 November 2017
- Preceded by: Neil Turner
- Succeeded by: Marty Hunt

Personal details
- Born: 21 August 1957 (age 69) Numurkah, Victoria, Australia
- Party: Independent
- Education: Queensland University of Technology
- Occupation: Police officer
- Profession: Solicitor

Peter William Wellington (born 21 August 1957) is an Australian politician. He was the independent member for Nicklin in the Queensland Legislative Assembly from 1998 to 2017, and served as Speaker from 2015 to 2017. Wellington has held the balance of power in the legislature twice in his career, and both times saw him give support to Labor-led minority governments.

== Before Parliament ==
Wellington grew up on his family's farm at Belli Park. Before entering parliament, Wellington was a police officer, and a solicitor. His first success in politics was when he was elected to a seat on the Maroochy Shire council.

== Parliamentary career ==
Wellington's defeat of the incumbent National Party candidate Neil Turner in the closely contested 1998 election reflected the instability in Queensland politics at the time. He was unexpectedly put in a position of considerable power when the Coalition suffered an 11-seat swing, resulting in a hung parliament. Nationals Premier Rob Borbidge could theoretically have formed government with the backing of Wellington, Gladstone independent Liz Cunningham, and the eleven elected members of the One Nation Party. After some deliberation however, Wellington chose to back Labor on matters of supply and confidence, although he would withdraw that support in the event of "any evidence of gross fraud, misappropriation or illegal activities." As a result, state ALP leader Peter Beattie was able to form a minority government.

Wellington held the balance of power for only a few months, until One Nation MP Charles Rappolt resigned from Parliament. ALP candidate Warren Pitt won the resulting by-election, and the ALP was able to form government in its own right.

Despite the loss of the balance of power, Wellington remained popular in his electorate. At the 2006 state election, he was able to easily see off National Party challenger Steve Morrison in order to secure a fourth term.

Wellington made headlines again in 2001 when he was severely injured in a farming accident which crushed both of his legs. He suffered a broken collarbone, pelvis, as well as head and leg injuries, and it was at first feared that he would lose one or both of his legs. However, he pulled through without the need for any amputation, and rejoined parliament a couple of months after the accident.

In the 2015 state election, the Liberal National government suffered a shock defeat, losing its previously overwhelming majority. Premier Campbell Newman even lost his own seat. The balance of power rested with Wellington and the two members of Katter's Australian Party. Labor leader Annastacia Palaszczuk could have formed government with Wellington's support, while the LNP needed the support of all three crossbenchers to make new leader Lawrence Springborg premier. On 5 February, Wellington announced his support for a Labor government. He had crossed swords on several occasions with Newman's government, and said he could not in good conscience support an LNP government in which several former members of Newman's government would have still figured. He also felt that Labor was best suited to restore transparency to the government. His terms were similar to the ones he laid down 17 years earlier; he stated he would withdraw his support if there was illegal or corrupt activity. By this time, Labor was projected to win 44 seats, which combined with Wellington's support would have been enough for a minority government. On 13 February, the results were formally declared, confirming Labor on 44 seats. With Wellington's support, Palaszczuk was duly sworn in as premier the next morning.

On the 16th of February 2017, he announced he would not be recontesting the seat of Nicklin, ending his 19-year parliamentary career.

Parliament of Queensland
Preceded by Neil Turner	Member for Nicklin; 1998–2017	Succeeded by Marty Hunt
Preceded by Fiona Simpson	Speaker of the Legislative Assembly of Queensland; 2015–2017	Succeeded by Curtis Pitt
