= John Dufficy =

Australian politician

Jack Dufficy

Member of the Queensland Legislative Assembly for Warrego
- In office 3 March 1951 – 17 May 1969
- Preceded by: Harry O'Shea
- Succeeded by: Jack Aiken

Personal details
- Born: John Joseph Dufficy; 2 November 1901 Byrnestown, Queensland, Australia
- Died: 6 November 1969 (aged 68) Charleville, Queensland, Australia
- Party: Labor
- Spouse: Gloria Williamsen (m.1956)
- Occupation: Trade union official

John Joseph Dufficy (2 November 1901 – 6 November 1969) was an Australian politician. He was the Labor Party member for Warrego in the Legislative Assembly of Queensland from 1951 until his death in 1969 in Queensland, Australia, at age 68.

Parliament of Queensland
Preceded by Harry O'Shea	Member for Warrego; 1951–1969	Succeeded by Jack Aiken
