= The Boss Cockie =

Play by Australian author Randolph Bedford

- Original language: English
- Written by: Randolph Bedford
- Genre: comedy

Premiere
- Date: 26 June 1920
- Place: Victoria Theatre, Newcastle, NSW

The Boss Cockie is a 1920 Australian stage play by Randolph Bedford. It was one of Bedford's best known works.

Bedford applied for copyright in 1915. The play was based on Bedford's book Aladdin and the Boss Cockie which was published in 1917.

The play's first production occurred at the Victoria Theatre, Newcastle, NSW with opening night being Saturday 26 June 1920.

== Critical reception ==
Referee said "the humor of the play is so broad as to become almost burlesque in some situations, and laughter is forced from the audience almost continuously after the first act".

The Argus said "it sparkles throughout with bright, wholesome humour, and with literary merit, and portrays true Australian types of men and women".

The Sydney Morning Herald thought Bedford "wasted his gift of humour and his literary ability on a thing of shreds and patches. .. dour unjointed acts of much-ado-about nothing".

Table Talk said "while it has some of the characteristics of previous Australian plays, it has far less exaggeration, and is more likely to appeal because of Its nearer approach to the real thing".
