= Harry O'Shea =

Australian politician

Member of the Queensland Legislative Assembly for Warrego
- In office 30 August 1941 – 4 November 1950
- Preceded by: Randolph Bedford
- Succeeded by: John Dufficy

Personal details
- Born: 1886 Coonamble, New South Wales, Australia
- Died: 4 November 1950 (aged 64) Brisbane, Queensland, Australia
- Resting place: Toowong Cemetery
- Party: Labour Party
- Spouse(s): Catherine Ness (m.1912 d.1920), Josephine Mary Vaughan (m.1931), Anne Brennan (m.1939 d.1987)
- Occupation: Labourer

Harry O'Shea (1886 – 4 November 1950) was a member of the Queensland Legislative Assembly.

== Biography ==
O'Shea was born in Coonamble, New South Wales, the son of Michael O'Shea and his wife Mary Ann (née White). He was educated in Coonamble and after he arrived in Queensland in 1935 took up work with the Queensland Railways as a general labourer. He was also a director of The Worker, the Labor Party newspaper.

O'Shea was married three times, firstly to Catherine Ness whom he married in Coonamble and together had three sons and a daughter. Catherine died in 1920 and in 1931 he married Josephine Mary Vaughan. His final marriage was to Anne Brennan (died 1987) in 1939 and together had a daughter. He died in Brisbane in November 1950 after a long illness and his funeral proceeded from St Stephen's Cathedral to the Toowong Cemetery.

== Public career ==
Following the death of Randolph Bedford, the member for Warrego in July 1941, O'Shea won the subsequent by-election for the Labor Party. He went on to represent the electorate until his own death in November 1950.

Parliament of Queensland
Preceded by Randolph Bedford	Member for Warrego; 1941–1950	Succeeded by John Dufficy
