= George Barber (politician) =

Australian politician

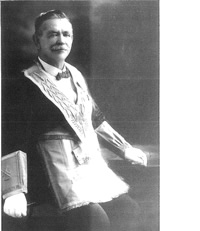

Member of the Queensland Legislative Assembly for Warrego
- In office 18 May 1907 – 24 September 1907
- Preceded by: Patrick Leahy
- Succeeded by: Patrick Leahy

Personal details
- Born: George Barber; 1860 Hoo, Kent, England
- Died: 10 April 1932 (aged 72) Charleville, Queensland, Australia
- Resting place: Charleville Cemetery
- Party: Labour Party
- Spouse(s): Florence Gifford (d.1922), Mary Ann Toub (m.1923)
- Occupation: Builder

George Barber (1860 – 10 April 1932) was a member of the Queensland Legislative Assembly.

== Biography ==
Barber was born in Hoo, Kent, the son of George Barber Snr. and his wife Fanny (née Parker). After his arrival in Charleville he was a builder.

Barber was twice married, firstly to Florence Gifford whom he married in Canterbury, England, and together had 6 sons and 4 daughters. Florence died in 1922 and the next year he married Mary Ann Toub. Barber died in April 1932 and was buried in the Charleville Cemetery.

== Public career ==
Barber won the seat of Warrego for the Labour Party at the 1907 Queensland state election, defeating the sitting member, Patrick Leahy. Leahy appealed the result based on the fact that Barber was insolvent and the Elections Judge reversed the result and installed Leahy as the member.

Parliament of Queensland
Preceded by Patrick Leahy	Member for Warrego; 1907	Succeeded by Patrick Leahy
