= John Leahy (Australian politician) =

Australian politician

The Honourable John Leahy
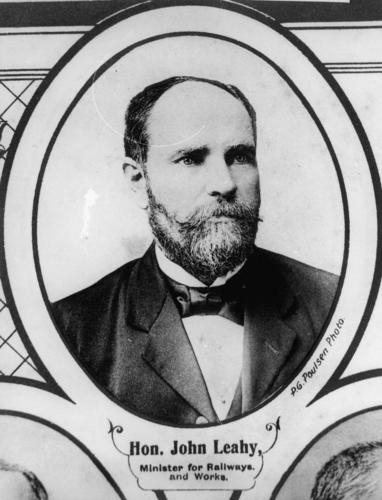

Speaker of the Queensland Legislative Assembly
- In office 23 July 1907 – 20 January 1909
- Preceded by: Alfred Cowley
- Succeeded by: Joshua Thomas Bell

Member of the Queensland Legislative Assembly for Bulloo
- In office 25 April 1893 – 20 January 1909
- Preceded by: John Donaldson
- Succeeded by: Frank Allen

Personal details
- Born: 15 July 1854 Schull, County Cork, Ireland
- Died: 20 January 1909 (aged 54) Brisbane, Queensland, Australia
- Resting place: Toowong Cemetery
- Party: Ministerialist
- Other political affiliations: Opposition Party, Independent
- Spouse: Annie Colbert (m.1886)
- Relations: Patrick Leahy (brother)
- Occupation: Publican, Newspaper proprietor

John Leahy (15 July 1854 – 20 January 1909) was a newspaper proprietor and member of the Queensland Legislative Assembly.

Leahy was born at Schull, County Cork, to Patrick Leahy, farmer, and his wife Mary (née Coghlan). After receiving his education he moved to Queensland where he was said to have worked as a rural labourer before becoming postmaster at Windorah then settling in Thargomindah. It was here that Leahy held a partnership in a cordial factory and, with his brother Patrick, became part-owner of the Thargomindah Herald. From 1886 until 1889 he was also the proprietor of the Royal Hotel which was located in the main street of the town.

== Political career ==
Leahy was the member for Bulloo from 1893 until his death in 1909. He was minister for Railways and Public Works from 1901 to 1903 and Speaker of the Queensland Legislative Assembly from 1907 to 1909.

== Personal life ==
On the 11 February 1886, Leahy married Annie Colbert at Thargomindah and together had one son and six daughters.

Leahy died in Brisbane in 1909. His funeral moved from his home in New Farm to the Toowong Cemetery.

Parliament of Queensland
Preceded by Alfred Cowley	Speaker of the Legislative Assembly of Queensland; 1907–1909	Succeeded by Joshua Thomas Bell
Preceded by John Donaldson	Member for Bulloo; 1893–1909	Succeeded by Frank Allen
