= Patrick Leahy (Australian politician) =

Australian politician

Patrick Leahy JP
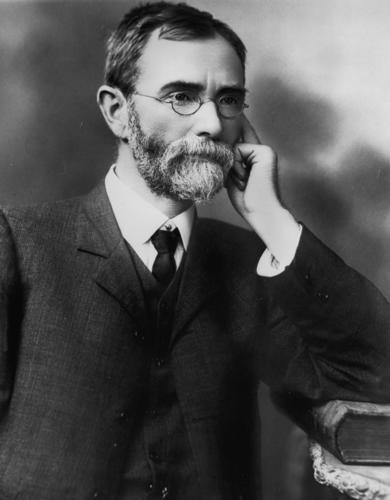

Member of the Queensland Legislative Assembly for Warrego
- In office 11 March 1902 – 18 May 1907
- Preceded by: David Bowman
- Succeeded by: George Barber
- In office 24 September 1907 – 5 February 1908
- Preceded by: George Barber
- Succeeded by: Harry Coyne

Member of the Queensland Legislative Council
- In office 1 July 1912 – 23 March 1922

Personal details
- Born: Patrick James Leahy; June 1860 Schull, County Cork, Ireland
- Died: 13 October 1927 (aged 67) Clayfield, Queensland, Australia
- Resting place: Toowong Cemetery
- Party: Ministerialist
- Other political affiliations: Opposition
- Spouse: Julia Alice Costello (m. 1897)
- Relations: John Leahy
- Occupation: Journalist

Patrick James Leahy (June 1860 – 13 October 1927) was an Irish-born Australian journalist and politician who served as a member of both the Queensland Legislative Council and the Queensland Legislative Assembly.

== Early life ==
Leahy was born in June 1860 at Schull, County Cork, to Patrick Leahy, farmer, and his wife Mary (née Coghlan). Educated at Schull National school, he came to the Colony of Queensland in 1887 to join his brother, John Leahy and began work as a journalist with the Brisbane Courier. He then moved to Western Queensland where he established The Herald newspaper in Thargomindah and became secretary of the Bulloo Divisional Board. In 1900 he established the Johnstone River Advocate newspaper (later the Johnstone River Advocate and Innisfail News) in Innisfail.

== Political career ==
After being a member of the Bulloo Shire Council for several years, Leahy stood as a Ministerialist candidate for the seat of Warrego at the 1902 state election, defeating the sitting Labour member, David Bowman. He held the seat until the 1907 state election when was defeated by Labour's George Barber. Leahy appealed the outcome on the basis that Barber was an uncertified insolvent and in September the Elections Tribunal reversed the result and Leahy was declared duly returned.

In November 1907, Leahy was appointed as Secretary for Public Works and Mines but at the 1908 state election, he lost the seat to Harry Coyne of the Labour Party. On 1 July 1912, he was called up by the Denham Ministry to the Legislative Council.

He took a leading role in fighting against the abolition of the council, making many well considered speeches against it. When the State Governor, Sir Hamilton Goold-Adams was being pressured by the Labour Government to make additional appointments to the council, he called on Leahy who was opposed to the idea to hear his views on the matter. Leahy was constantly and strenuously opposed to any legislation that savoured of socialist or communist ideals. He had a good knowledge of law, especially laws that applied to the land, and was a Justice of the Peace.

== Personal life ==
On 13 December 1885, he had married Julia Alice Costello at Thargomindah and together had five children. He died in October 1927 and was buried in Toowong Cemetery.

Parliament of Queensland
Preceded by David Bowman	Member for Warrego; 1902–1907	Succeeded by George Barber
Preceded by George Barber	Member for Warrego; 1907–1908	Succeeded by Harry Coyne
