= William Edward Murphy =

Australian politician

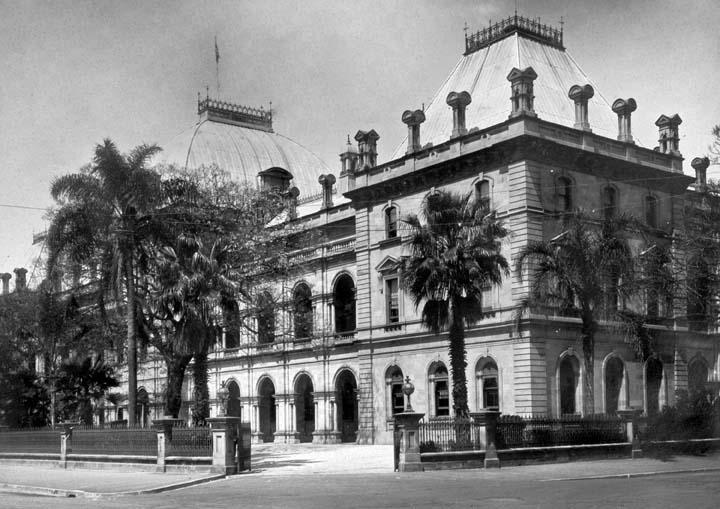
Parliament House Queensland, 1926

William Edward Murphy (1833–1881) was a politician in Queensland, Australia. He was a Member of the Queensland Legislative Assembly, the first representative for the seat of Cook. He held this seat from 1 June 1876 to 5 December 1878.

== Personal life ==
He was born in 1833 in Sydney, New South Wales, Australia, and died on 26 May 1881 in Pyrmont, New South Wales. Before entering Parliament he was a solicitor in Brisbane. His religion was Roman Catholic.
