= Jack Aiken =

Australian politician

Member of the Queensland Legislative Assembly for Warrego
- In office 17 May 1969 – 7 December 1974
- Preceded by: John Dufficy
- Succeeded by: Neil Turner

Personal details
- Born: John Albert Aiken; 17 March 1918 Kensington, New South Wales, Australia
- Died: 3 September 2016 (aged 98) Brisbane, Queensland, Australia
- Party: Labour Party
- Spouse: Barbara Davidson (m.1945 3 children )
- Occupation: Grazier

John Albert Aiken (17 March 1918 – 3 September 2016) was an Australian politician who was a member of the Queensland Legislative Assembly.

== Biography ==
Aiken was born in Kensington, New South Wales, the son of John Hugh O'Neill Aiken and his wife Clare Anastasia (née Wond). He was educated at Hornsby Public and Chatswood Intermediate high schools before attending the East Sydney Technical College where he graduated with honours in wool technology.

After arriving in Queensland he owned a newsagency in Charleville from 1947 until 1954 and afterwards owned a general store in Cooladdi. He then was a grazier and bloodstock breeder.

On 12 February 1945, he married Barbara Davidson and together they had a son and two daughters. He died in Brisbane at age 98.

== Public career ==
Aiken won the seat of Warrego for the Labor Party at the 1969 Queensland state election. He held it for five and a half years until his defeat by Neil Turner of the Country Party at the 1974 Queensland state election.

Parliament of Queensland
Preceded by John Dufficy	Member for Warrego; 1969–1974	Succeeded by Neil Turner
