= Frank Allen (politician) =

Australian politician

Member of the Queensland Legislative Assembly for Bulloo
- In office 27 March 1909 – 27 April 1912
- Preceded by: John Leahy
- Succeeded by: Seat abolished

Personal details
- Born: Barnett Francis Samuel Allen; 19 February 1882 Swan Creek, Queensland, Australia
- Died: 18 October 1948 (aged 66) Brisbane, Queensland, Australia
- Resting place: Lutwyche Cemetery
- Party: Labour Party
- Spouse: Edith Alison Chisholm (m.1909 d.1974)
- Occupation: Teacher

Barnett Francis Samuel "Frank" Allen (19 February 1882 – 18 October 1948) was an Australian politician. He was the Labor member for Bulloo in the Legislative Assembly of Queensland from 1909 to 1912.

== Biography ==
Allen was born in Swan Creek, Queensland, the son of Robert Allen and his wife Jane (née Grayson). He was educated at East Warwick, Swan Creek, Freestone, and Allora and spent his working life as a teacher, working at various schools around southern Queensland.

In December 1917 Allen joined the First Australian Imperial Force to fight in World War I. He embarked from Sydney on the S.S. Wyreema in October the next year.

On 13 December 1909 he married Edith Alison Chisholm (died 1974) at Mitchell and together had four sons and a daughter. Allen died in October 1948 and is buried in Lutwyche Cemetery.

== Public career ==
Allen, representing the Labour Party, stood for the seat of Bulloo at the 1908 Queensland state election but was defeated by the sitting member, John Leahy. A year later, there was another state election and by now Leahy had retired from politics. Allen won the election but was the member for only three years as the seat was abolished before the 1912 Queensland state election.

Parliament of Queensland
Preceded by John Leahy	Member for Bulloo; 1909–1912	Abolished
