= Electoral district of Nicklin =

State electoral district of Queensland, Australia

Nicklin Queensland—Legislative Assembly
- Electoral map of Nicklin 2017
- State: Queensland
- Dates current: 1986–present
- MP: Marty Hunt
- Party: Liberal National
- Namesake: Frank Nicklin
- Electors: 35,007 (2020)
- Area: 686 km^{2} (264.9 sq mi)
- Demographic: Provincial
- Coordinates: 26°31′S 152°50′E
Electorates around Nicklin:
Gympie	Gympie	Noosa
Glass House	Nicklin	Ninderry
Glass House	Caloundra	Buderim

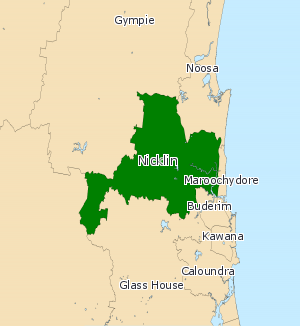
Electoral map of Nicklin 2008

Nicklin is an electoral district of the Legislative Assembly in the Australian state of Queensland. The electorate is centred in the Sunshine Coast hinterland, and stretches north to Black Mountain, south to Palmwoods and Montville, and west to Kenilworth, including Conondale National Park. It includes notable localities such as Nambour, Yandina, Cooroy, Bli Bli, Mapleton and Woombye.

The seat is currently held by Marty Hunt of the Liberal National Party, who won the seat by 2.7% in 2024. Nicklin was previously held by long serving Independent MP Peter Wellington, who held the balance of power twice during his tenure.

== Members for Nicklin ==
Member	Party	Term
Brian Austin	National	1986–1989
Bob King	Liberal	1989–1990
Neil Turner	National	1990–1998
Peter Wellington	Independent	1998–2017
Marty Hunt	Liberal National	2017–2020
Robert Skelton	Labor	2020–2024
Marty Hunt	Liberal National	2024–present

^{1} Election declared void by the Court of Disputed Returns

== Election results ==
2024 Queensland state election: Nicklin
Party	Candidate	Votes	%	±%
Liberal National	Marty Hunt	12,379	37.84	−0.06
Labor	Robert Skelton	9,745	29.79	−4.71
Greens	Sue Etheridge	3,292	10.06	−2.44
Legalise Cannabis	Melody Lindsay	2,506	7.66	+7.66
One Nation	Rebecca McCosker	2,401	7.34	+0.94
Family First	Phillip Eschler	1,519	4.64	+4.64
Independent	Steve Dickson	875	2.67	+2.67
Total formal votes		32,717	95.22	
Informal votes		1,644	4.78	
Turnout		34,361	87.70	
Two-party-preferred result
Liberal National	Marty Hunt	17,240	52.69	+2.79
Labor	Robert Skelton	15,477	47.31	−2.79
Liberal National gain from Labor		Swing	+2.79	

Primary vote results in Nicklin (Parties with less than 5% of the vote are omitted)
Liberal National

Liberal
National

Labor
One Nation
Greens
Katter's Australian
Australian Democrats
Independent
View source data.
Two-candidate-preferred vote results in Nicklin View source data.
