= Randolph Bedford =

Australian politician

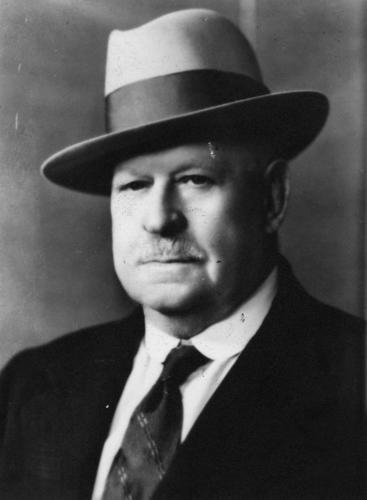

Member of the Queensland Legislative Council
- In office 12 October 1917 – 21 February 1918
- In office 27 May 1918 – 23 March 1922

Member of the Queensland Legislative Assembly for Warrego
- In office 13 October 1923 – 8 September 1937
- Preceded by: Harry Coyne
- Succeeded by: Himself
- In office 4 December 1937 – 7 July 1941
- Preceded by: Himself
- Succeeded by: Harry O'Shea

Personal details
- Born: George Randolph Bedford; 27 June 1868 Camperdown, New South Wales, Australia
- Died: 7 July 1941 (aged 73) Brisbane, Queensland, Australia
- Party: Labor
- Spouse(s): Mary Henrietta Arrowsmith (m. 1889; separated 1912), Ada Billings (partner 1915–41)
- Occupation: Autobiographer, hospital owner, journalist and politician

Randolph Bedford (born George Randolph Bedford 27 June 1868 – 7 July 1941) was an Australian poet, novelist, short story writer and Queensland state politician.

== Early life ==
Bedford was born in Camperdown, Sydney, the son of Alfred Bedford, who migrated from Yorkshire, England in 1859 and obtained work as a house painter.

He was educated at the Newtown state school. At the age of 14, he worked with a Sydney solicitors firm as an office-boy. At 16 years of age he worked in the western district of New South Wales, shooting rabbits. He carried copies of Carlyle's French Revolution, Shakespeare and the Bible. He worked for a year as a clerk in Hay and joined up with a repertory company run by Edmund Duggan, in Wagga Wagga.

== Literary career ==
A comprehensive bibliography of Bedford's work was published in 1982.

With Australian authors Henry Lawson and Victor Daley et al., he was a member of the elite Dawn and Dusk Club.

== Political career ==
In 1917, Bedford entered the Queensland Legislative Council, on a platform to secure its abolition (which occurred in 1922). In 1923, he was elected as Labor candidate to the Queensland Legislative Assembly for Warrego. In 1937, he unsuccessfully ran to represent the Division of Maranoa in the Australian House of Representatives.

He was an ardent Protectionist, and decried the way the wealth of Australia was exported to pay for shoddy goods which could have been produced locally.

Bedford died on 7 July 1941 and was cremated at Mount Thompson crematorium.

== Bibliography ==
=== Plays ===
- White Australia (1909)
- Lady of the Pluck-Up (1911)
- The Boss Cockie (1920)

=== Novels ===
- True Eyes and the Whirlwind (1903)
- The Snare of Strength (1905)
- Sops of Wine (1909)
- Billy Pagan Mining Engineer (1911)
- The Mates of Torres (1911)
- The Lady of the Pickup (1911)
- The Silver Star (1917)
- Aladdin and the Boss Cockie (1919)

Short Story A Samaritan of the Riverine, in [Adventure Magazine, vol 1 No 4, 1911)

=== Non-fiction ===
- Explorations in Civilization (1914)

=== Autobiography ===
- Naught to Thirty-Three (1944)

Parliament of Queensland
Preceded by Harry Coyne	Member for Warrego; 1923–1937	Succeeded by Himself
Preceded by Himself	Member for Warrego; 1937–1941	Succeeded by Harry O'Shea
