= John Donaldson (Australian politician) =

Australian politician (1841–1896)

The Hon John Donaldson
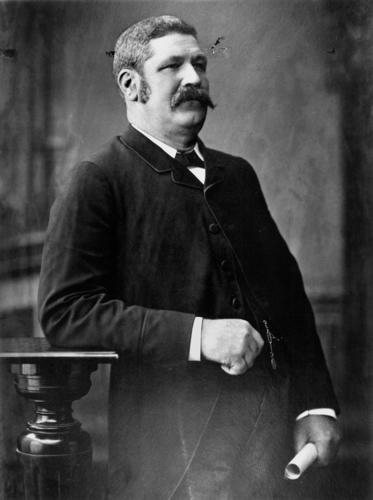

21st Treasurer of Queensland
- In office 19 Nov 1889 – 12 Aug 1890
- Preceded by: William Pattison
- Succeeded by: Thomas McIlwraith
- Constituency: Bulloo

Member of the Queensland Legislative Assembly for Warrego
- In office 5 October 1883 – 19 May 1888
- Preceded by: Ernest Stevens
- Succeeded by: Richard Casey

Member of the Queensland Legislative Assembly for Bulloo
- In office 26 May 1888 – 25 April 1893
- Preceded by: New seat
- Succeeded by: John Leahy

Member of the Queensland Legislative Assembly for Logan
- In office 4 April 1896 – 25 July 1896
- Preceded by: Ernest Stevens
- Succeeded by: James Stodart

Personal details
- Born: John Donaldson; 15 October 1841 Purdeet, Victoria
- Died: 25 July 1896 (aged 51) Coorparoo, Brisbane
- Resting place: Toowong Cemetery
- Party: Ministerial
- Spouse(s): Margaret Walker m.1869 d.?, Gertrude Evelyn Willis (m.1886)
- Occupation: Grazier

John Donaldson (15 October 1841 – 25 July 1896) was a politician in colonial Queensland, serving as Colonial Treasurer from 19 November 1889 to 12 August 1890.

Donaldson was born in Purdeet, Victoria, Australia, and initially engaged in squatting pursuits. He moved to New South Wales in 1876 and later to Queensland in 1881.

Donaldson was elected to the Queensland Legislative Assembly for Warrego on 5 October 1883, holding that seat until 19 May 1888. He subsequently represented Bulloo from 26 May 1888 to 25 April 1893, and later Logan from 4 April 1896 until his death on 25 July 1896.

He was appointed Postmaster-General of Queensland and Secretary for Public Instruction in the Thomas McIlwraith Ministry on 13 June 1888. When the ministry was restructured under Boyd Dunlop Morehead on 30 November in that year, Donaldson retained these posts until 19 November 1889, when he succeeded William Pattison as Colonial Treasurer. He resigned along with his colleagues in August 1890 due to the Assembly's opposition to his financial proposals. Donaldson also served as one of Queensland's delegates to the Federation Convention held in Sydney in March 1891.

Donaldson died in Coorparoo, Queensland, on 25 July 1896. He married twice, first to Margaret Walker (who predeceased him) and then to Gertrude Evelyn Willis. He had two surviving sons from his first marriage and a surviving son and two daughters from his second marriage.

Following a short service at his late Coorparoo residence, Donaldson was buried in Toowong Cemetery.

Parliament of Queensland
Preceded by Ernest James Stevens	Member for Warrego; 1883 – 1888	Succeeded by Richard Casey
New seat	Member for Bulloo; 1888 – 1893	Succeeded by John Leahy
Preceded by Ernest James Stevens	Member for Logan; 1896	Succeeded by James Stodart
