= Neil Turner (Australian politician) =

Australian politician

The Hon Neil Turner

Speaker of the Queensland Legislative Assembly
- In office 2 April 1996 – 13 June 1998
- Preceded by: Jim Fouras
- Succeeded by: Ray Hollis
- Constituency: Nicklin

Member of the Queensland Legislative Assembly for Warrego
- In office 2 December 1974 – 1 November 1986
- Preceded by: Jack Aiken
- Succeeded by: Howard Hobbs

Member of the Queensland Legislative Assembly for Nicklin
- In office 2 December 1989 – 22 June 1998
- Preceded by: Bob King
- Succeeded by: Peter Wellington

Personal details
- Born: Neil John Turner; 25 June 1934 Charleville, Queensland, Australia
- Died: 4 July 2011 (aged 77) Nambour, Queensland, Australia
- Party: Country Party/National Party

Neil John Turner (25 June 1934 – 4 July 2011) was a National Party politician from Queensland. He served as the Minister of Transport and Speaker of the Legislative Assembly of Queensland.

Turner was born in 1934 in Charleville. He served as the member for Warrego between 1974 and 1986, and the member for Nicklin between 1990 and 1998, when he lost his seat to independent Peter Wellington. He served as Speaker from 1996 until his 1998 defeat.

On 4 July 2011, Turner died at the age of 77.

Parliament of Queensland
Preceded by Jim Fouras	Speaker of the Legislative Assembly; 1996– 1998	Succeeded by Ray Hollis
Preceded by Jack Aiken	Member for Warrego; 1974–1986	Succeeded by Howard Hobbs
Preceded by Bob King	Member for Nicklin; 1989–1998	Succeeded by Peter Wellington
