= Ernest James Stevens =

Australian politician

The Hon Ernest Stevens
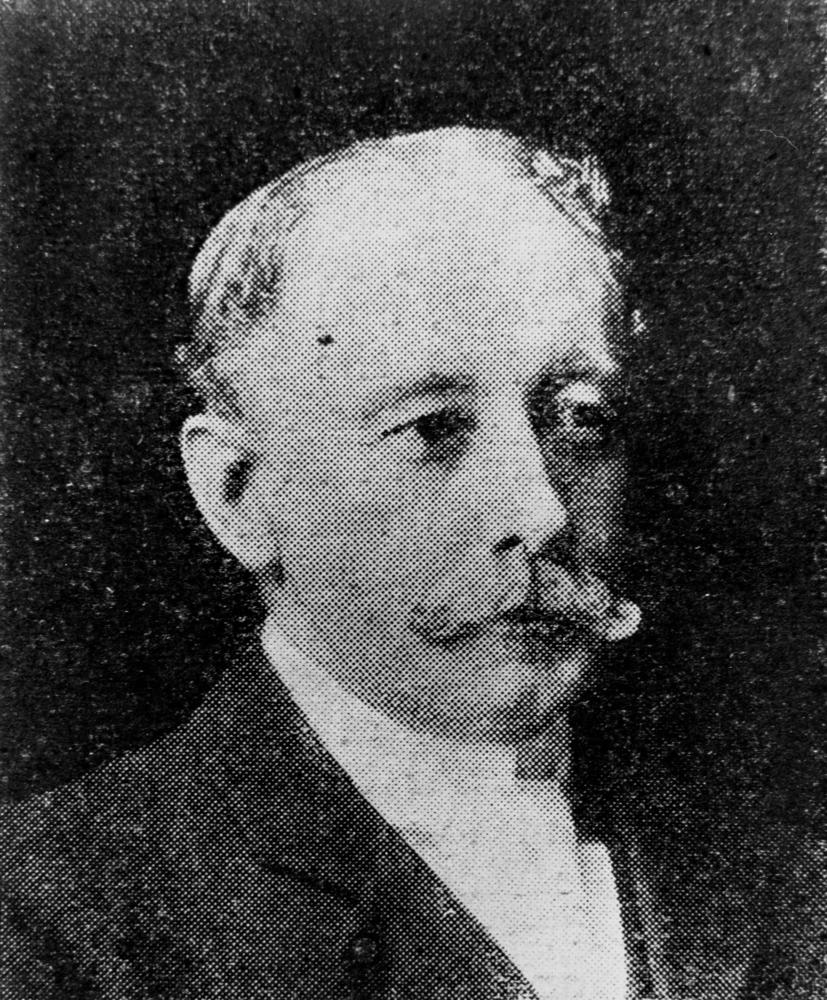
- Ernest James Stevens, 1905

Member of the Queensland Legislative Assembly for Warrego
- In office 14 November 1878 – 17 August 1883
- Preceded by: William Walsh
- Succeeded by: John Donaldson

Member of the Queensland Legislative Assembly for Logan
- In office 17 August 1883 – 4 April 1896
- Preceded by: Peter McLean
- Succeeded by: John Donaldson

Member of the Queensland Legislative Council
- In office 6 April 1899 – 7 September 1920

Personal details
- Born: Ernest James Stevens; 10 July 1845 Melbourne, Australia
- Died: 3 March 1922 (aged 76) Brisbane, Australia
- Resting place: Southport Cemetery
- Spouse: Ada Constance Jackson (m. 1877; died 1913)
- Occupation: Company chairman and director

Ernest James Stevens (10 July 1845 – 3 March 1922) was an Australian politician and businessman who served as a Member of the Queensland Legislative Assembly and later Member of the Queensland Legislative Council in colonial Queensland and Australia.

== Early life ==
Ernest James Stevens was born in 1845 in Victoria, the son of Frederick Perkins Stevens and his wife Jane (née Rule).

On 20 June 1877 he married Ada Constance Jackson in Casterton, Victoria.

== Political life ==
Ernest Stevens was elected to the Queensland Legislative Assembly to represent the electoral district of Warrego from 14 November 1878 to 17 August 1883.

He was elected to the Queensland Legislative Assembly to represent the electoral district of Logan from 17 August 1883 to 4 April 1896.

In July 1884 Stevens proposed that the Queensland Government erect a fence to prevent the infestation of rabbits in New South Wales from spreading into Queensland (his Logan electorate being very close to the New South Wales border).

On 6 April 1899 he was appointed a life member of the Queensland Legislative Council, an appointment that terminated with his retirement on 7 September 1920.

== Later life ==
Ernest Stevens died on 3 March 1922 in a Brisbane private hospital, following a period of ill-health. He was buried in Southport Cemetery on 4 March 1922.

Parliament of Queensland
Preceded by William Walsh	Member for Warrego; 1878–1883	Succeeded by John Donaldson
Preceded by Peter McLean	Member for Logan; 1883–1896	Succeeded by John Donaldson
