= Peter McLean (politician) =

Australian politician (1837–1924)

Member of the Queensland Legislative Assembly for Logan
- In office 9 May 1876 – 17 August 1883
- Preceded by: Frederick Shaw
- Succeeded by: Ernest Stevens

Personal details
- Born: Peter McLean; 1837 Glasgow, Scotland
- Died: 1924 (aged 86–87) Brisbane, Queensland, Australia
- Resting place: South Brisbane Cemetery
- Spouse: Helen Learmouth (died 1907)
- Occupation: Agricultural Advisor, Inspector

Peter McLean (September 1837 – 10 December 1924) was a politician in colonial Queensland, Secretary for Public Lands and Mines 1878 to 1879.

McLean was born in Glasgow, Scotland, and educated at the Normal School. In 1854 he arrived in Victoria (Australia), and worked on the goldfields until 1862, when he returned to the old country and engaged in agricultural pursuits. His health failing, he went to Queensland in 1865, where he commenced dairying operations.

McLean was returned to the Queensland Legislative Assembly on 9 May 1876 for the Electoral district of Logan, and was appointed Secretary for Public Lands and Mines in the Douglas Ministry on 7 December 1878, just six weeks before their defeat. McLean was a prominent advocate of total abstinence in parliament. He was returned three times for Logan, but was defeated in 1883. He thereafter became Inspecting Commissioner of Crown Lands in November 1883, a post which he held until his nomination as Under-Secretary of the newly created Department of Agriculture in July 1887. In March 1889 he received the additional appointment of Curator of Botanic Gardens, Parks, and Preserves.

McLean died in Brisbane, Queensland, Australia on 10 December 1924 and was buried in South Brisbane Cemetery.

Parliament of Queensland
Preceded by Frederick Shaw	Member for Logan; 1876–1883	Succeeded by Ernest Stevens
