= Adam Black (Australian politician) =

Australian politician

Member of the Queensland Legislative Assembly for Logan
- In office 16 April 1875 – 4 October 1875
- Preceded by: Philip Henry Nind
- Succeeded by: Frederick Shaw

Personal details
- Born: Adam Black; 8 August 1839 North Berwick, Scotland
- Died: 26 December 1902 (aged 60-61) Gympie, Queensland, Australia
- Resting place: Gympie Cemetery
- Spouse: Jane Margaret Drummond Barlow (m.1869 d.1901)
- Occupation: Gold miner, Quartz miner

Adam Black (8 August 1839 – 26 December 1902) was a politician in Queensland, Australia. He was a Member of the Queensland Legislative Assembly.

== Early life and business career ==
Black was born in Mordington, Berwickshire, Scotland to parents George Black and his wife Marjory née Hogg. George and Marjory Black had six children: John, Agnes, Janet, Adam, George and David. In 1851 the Black family were living at Prenderguest, Ayton in Berwickshire.

Black arrived in Gympie, Queensland in 1868 from New Zealand where he gained farming and mining experience.

=== Mining career ===
Black was one of the four pioneers of quartz mining in Gympie. They were not only successful in discovering quartz but in getting the gold to the surface in the New Zealand Reef in Gympie.

Black and Gilbert Muir, later of the Nooya Plantation in Beenleigh, Queensland, owned significant gold interests in the New Zealand Reef. Muir had previously worked the New Zealand gold fields.

== Political career ==
In the 1870s Black acquired a property in Logan, Queensland and settled there. He represented Logan in the Legislative Assembly of Queensland from 16 April 1875 to 4 October 1875.

He is said to have not liked parliamentary life so did not seek re-election after the parliament was dissolved. He returned to Gympie to pursue mining operations again but did not meet with the same success as his previous efforts.

Black was the president of the South Queensland Agricultural and Pastoral Association from 1875 to 1877.

== Personal life ==
On 16 March 1869 in Gympie, Black married Jane Margaret Drummond Barlow. Together they had 7 sons and 2 daughters: George Barlow (1870–1925), Jenny Louise (1872–1911), Adam Robert (1874–1918), Alexander Drummond (1875–1876), Alexander (1877–1880), Margery (1879–1948), Archibald (1881–1933), Charles Ostwald (1883–1951) and Norman (1888–1955).

Black died in Gympie on Friday 26 December 1902 from cancer. He was buried in the Gympie Cemetery on the afternoon of 27 December, the Reverend J. S. M'Intyre minister of the Presbyterian Church, conducted the services at the grave side.

=== Logan residence ===
Architect Charles Smith designed Black's 'Italianate' style home on the Albert in the Logan region in Queensland. Smith had previously worked the New Zealand gold fields.

=== Jane Margaret Drummon Barlow ===
Jane was born Margaret Drummond in Perthshire, Scotland, in 1850. Her mother died in Melbourne's Tent Town soon after arriving in Melbourne, Australia in 1853, and her father six months later. In 1855 at the age of five Jane was adopted by entertainer William Robert Barlow and his wife Jane. She was renamed Jane Margaret Drummond Barlow.

Parliament of Queensland
Preceded by Philip Henry Nind	Member for Logan; 1875	Succeeded by Frederick Shaw
