= Frederick Shaw (Queensland politician) =

Australian politician

Member of the Queensland Legislative Assembly for Logan
- In office 19 October 1875 – 12 April 1876
- Preceded by: Adam Black
- Succeeded by: Peter McLean

Personal details
- Born: Frederick Shaw; 1824 Pontefract, Yorkshire, England
- Died: 19 March 1902 (aged 78) Emu Park, Queensland, Australia
- Resting place: South Rockhampton Cemetery
- Spouse: Matilda Thompson
- Occupation: Queensland manager of Cobb and Co

Frederick Shaw (1824 - 19 March 1902) was a member of the Queensland Legislative Assembly.

== Biography ==
Shaw was born in Pontefract, Yorkshire, the son of Isaac Shaw and his wife Ann. He was educated in Yorkshire and by 1861 was in Australia and working as an agent in Dalby for Cobb and Co. Around 1871 he was growing sugar in the Albert region and then was the General Manager for Queensland of Cobb and Co. in 1876. He was a Director of the City and Suburban Building Society in 1892.

He was married to Matilda Thompson and together had three sons and three daughters. Shaw died at Emu Park on 19 March 1902 and his body was sent to Rockhampton by train the next morning for his burial at the South Rockhampton Cemetery.

== Public career ==
Shaw won the seat of Logan in the Queensland Legislative Assembly in 1875 following the resignation of Adam Black who it was said to not like parliamentary life. Shaw himself resigned from the parliament in 1876.

Parliament of Queensland
Preceded by Adam Black	Member for Logan; 1875–1876	Succeeded by Peter McLean
