= Electoral district of Logan =

State electoral district of Queensland, Australia

Logan Queensland—Legislative Assembly
- Map of the electoral district of Logan, 2017
- State: Queensland
- Dates current: 1872–1949, 1960–1972, 1986–present
- MP: Linus Power
- Party: Labor
- Namesake: Logan River
- Electors: 37,695 (2020)
- Area: 356 km^{2} (137.5 sq mi)
- Demographic: Outer-metropolitan
- Coordinates: 27°45′S 153°2′E
Electorates around Logan:
Algester	Woodridge	Waterford
Jordan	Logan	Macalister
Scenic Rim	Scenic Rim	Coomera

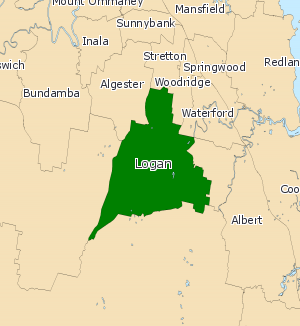
2008 map of Logan

Logan is an electoral district in southern Queensland, Australia.

Logan encompasses urban and semi-rural environments on the southern outskirts of the Brisbane metropolitan area. Major locations within the electoral district include Boronia Heights, Greenbank, Munruben, Chambers Flat, Yarrabilba, Park Ridge, Jimboomba, Kairabah, South Maclean, and North Maclean.

== History ==
The electoral district of Logan was established under the 1872 Electoral Districts Act which excised the southern part of the Electoral district of East Moreton (the Gold Coast area). Successive redistributions shifted the boundaries northwards towards Brisbane. It was abolished in the 1949 redistribution, being mostly absorbed into the Electoral district of Coorparoo and the Electoral district of Yeronga.

In the 1959 redistribution, the Logan electoral district was re-created in the Redland Shire, largely replacing the Electoral district of Darlington. Logan electoral district was abolished again in the 1971 redistribution, by replaced by the Electoral district of Redlands.

In 1986 the Logan electoral district was again re-created, encompassing the north-eastern part of the Electoral district of Fassifern and the north-western part of the Electoral district of Albert. In 1991 the eastern half of the Logan electorate was lost to the Electoral district of Waterford and the Electoral district of Woodridge, leaving the Logan electorate located in the suburbs of Boronia Heights, Browns Plains, Marsden and Park Ridge.

== Members for Logan ==
First incarnation (1873–1950)
Member	Party	Term
Philip Nind	Unaligned	1873–1875
Adam Black	Unaligned	1875
Frederick Shaw	Unaligned	1875–1876
Peter McLean	Unaligned	1876–1883
Ernest James Stevens	Independent	1883–1896
John Donaldson	Independent/Ministerialist	1896
James Stodart	Ministerialist/Opposition/Liberal	1896–1918
Alfred James	Labor	1918–1920
Reginald King	National/United Party/ Country and Progressive National	1920–1935
John Brown	Labor	1935–1944
Thomas Hiley	Queensland People's/ Liberal	1944–1950
Second incarnation (1960–1972)
Member	Party	Term
Leslie Harrison	Country	1960–1966
Dick Wood	Country	1966–1969
Ted Baldwin	Labor	1969–1972
Third incarnation (1986–present)
Member	Party	Term
Wayne Goss	Labor	1986–1998
John Mickel	Labor	1998–2012
Michael Pucci	Liberal National	2012–2015
Linus Power	Labor	2015–present

== Election results ==
2024 Queensland state election: Logan
Party	Candidate	Votes	%	±%
Labor	Linus Power	15,965	40.66	−12.81
Liberal National	Mathew Owens	13,321	33.93	+9.03
One Nation	Aaron Abraham	3,975	10.13	−3.68
Greens	Joshua Riethmuller	2,543	6.48	+0.35
Legalise Cannabis	Jacqueline Verne	2,062	5.25	+5.25
Family First	Simon Taylor	1,395	3.55	+3.55
Total formal votes		39,261	94.38	−1.88
Informal votes		2,337	5.62	+1.88
Turnout		41,598	85.29	−0.20
Two-party-preferred result
Labor	Linus Power	21,304	54.26	−9.13
Liberal National	Mathew Owens	17,957	45.74	+9.13
Labor hold		Swing	−9.13	
