= Richard Casey (Queensland politician) =

Australian politician

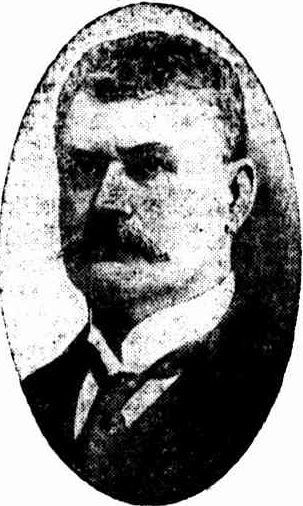

Member of the Queensland Legislative Assembly for Warrego
- In office 19 May 1888 – 20 May 1893
- Preceded by: John Donaldson
- Succeeded by: James Crombie

Personal details
- Born: Richard Gardiner Casey; 17 December 1846 Hobart, Van Diemen's Land, Australia
- Died: 25 April 1919 (aged 72) Honolulu, Territory of Hawaii
- Spouse: Evelyn Jane Harris (m.1888 d.1942)
- Relations: Lord Casey (son), George Harris (father-in-law)
- Occupation: Grazier, Gold mining investor

Richard Gardiner Casey (17 December 1846 – 25 April 1919) was a politician in Queensland, Australia. He was a Member of the Queensland Legislative Assembly.

== Early life ==
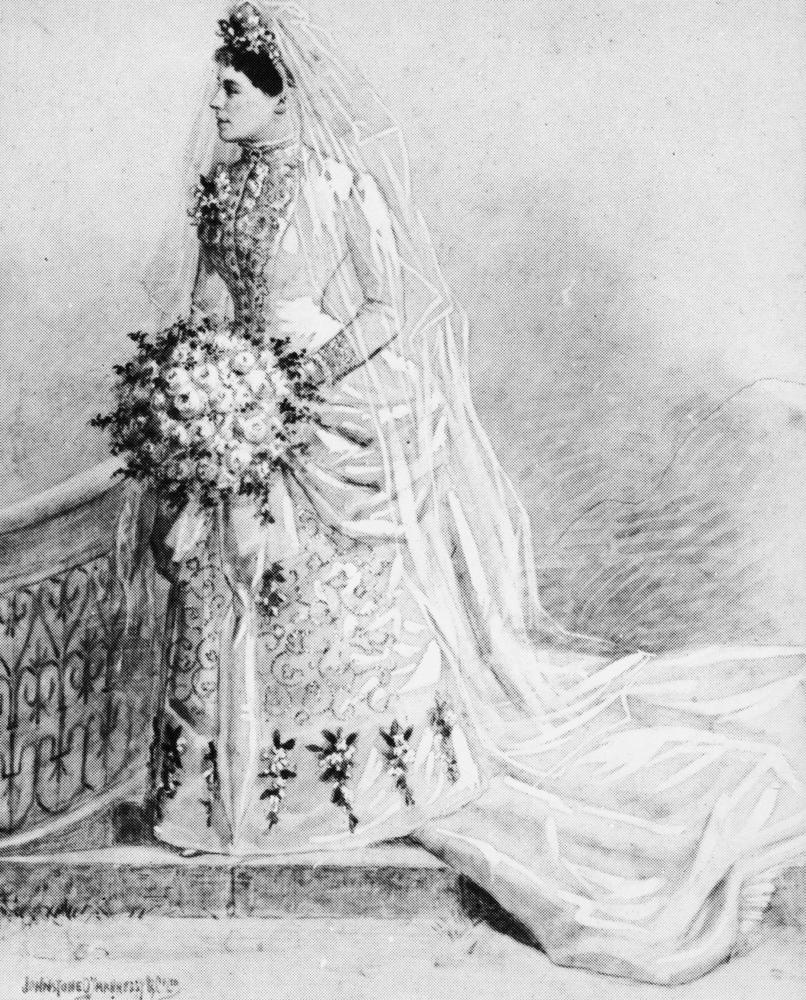
Bridal photograph of Evelyn Jane Casey, née Harris, 1888

Richard Gardiner Casey was born on 17 December 1846 in Hobart, Van Diemen's Land (present day Tasmania), the son of Dr Cornelius Gavin Casey and his wife Letitia (née Gardiner).

Casey was educated at Hobart High School and Launceston Grammar School.

On 23 May 1888, Richard Gardiner Casey married Evelyn Jane Harris at St John's Anglican Cathedral, Brisbane, Queensland; the service was conducted by the Rev. Benjamin Glennie. Evelyn was the daughter of George Harris (a Member of the Queensland Legislative Council) and granddaughter of George Thorn (senior) of the Normanby pastoral station (a Member of the Queensland Legislative Council). The reception was held at the bride's parents' residence, Newstead House (then one of Brisbane's finest homes), after which the couple left for a honeymoon at Sandgate, then a popular beachside holiday resort.

The couple had three children:

- Richard Gavin Gardner Casey (1890–1976), a Governor-General of Australia
- Eileen Ruth Evelyn Casey (1893–1894)
- Dermot Armstrong Casey (1897–1977)

== Politics ==
On 19 May 1888 (the 1888 colonial election) Casey was elected to the Queensland Legislative Assembly in the electoral district of Warrego. He held the seat until the 1893 election.

== Later life ==
Casey was an expert horseman and owner of several good racehorses. He served as Chairman of the Victorian Racing Club from 1907 to 1916, when he and his wife sailed to England to be nearer to their sons who were with the AIF in France. On returning from England to Australia in 1919 on the SS Makura, Casey was taken ill and taken ashore in Honolulu, Hawaii where he died of pneumonia on 25 April 1919.

Parliament of Queensland
Preceded by John Donaldson	Member for Warrego; 1888–1893	Succeeded by James Crombie
