= Philip Henry Nind =

Australian politician

Philip Nind

Member of the Queensland Legislative Assembly for Logan
- In office 28 November 1873 – 27 May 1874
- Preceded by: New seat
- Succeeded by: Himself
- In office 8 June 1874 – 3 April 1875
- Preceded by: Himself
- Succeeded by: Adam Black

Personal details
- Born: Philip Henry Nind; 7 April 1831 Wargrave, Berkshire, England
- Died: 9 March 1896 (aged 64) Lashlake House, Thame, England
- Education: Eton College, Christ Church, Oxford
- Occupation: Gold commissioner, Magistrate, Explorer

Philip Henry Nind (7 April 1831 – 9 March 1896) was an English rower and gold commissioner in colonial British Columbia. He was also a politician in Queensland, Australia, where he was a Member of the Queensland Legislative Assembly.

== Early life ==
Philip Henry Nind was born in Wargrave, Berkshire on 7 April 1831, the son of Rev. Philip Henry Nind and his wife Agnes Bussell. He attended Eton College and Christ Church, Oxford where he was a proficient rower. In the 1852 Boat Race, he rowed No 3 in the winning Oxford boat stroked by J W Chitty. At Henley Royal Regatta, he won Silver Goblets in 1852 partnering H R Barker and was also a member of the winning Oxford four in the Stewards' Challenge Cup. In 1853 Nind was a member of the winning Oxford eight in the Grand Challenge Cup at Henley and was also again in the winning Oxford four in Stewards' Challenge Cup. He was a member of the crew in the winning Oxford Boat in the 1854 Boat Race.

== British Columbia ==
In 1860 Nind took the position of Gold Commissioner and JP for Cariboo, British Columbia as the Cariboo Gold Rush was just getting under way. William Pinchbeck accompanied Nind to Williams Lake to create a local government and bring law and order to the area. Nind had originally considered Fort Alexandria for this purpose but chose Williams Lake instead as it was at a junction of two main pack trails: one from the Douglas Road and another through the Fraser Canyon. While stationed in the Cariboo Nind wrote voluminous letters and reports to Vancouver Island governor James Douglas in Victoria, telling him about the many developments taking place in the district. In 1861 Nind had a government house built and requested the construction of a jail. By the middle of the year he was severely overworked causing him insomnia and a nervous twitch, In October he requested leave and in December went to England. It took three men to replace him in the work he had been doing. He was succeeded as gold commissioner by Thomas Elwyn until Elwyn resigned later in the year through conflict of interest in having his own claim. Nind returned to British Columbia with his new wife in 1863. When the gold escort was temporarily revived in 1863 Elwyn was made second in command to Nind Nind was moved around from one backwater post to another until he resigned in 1866.

== Queensland, Australia ==
In 1869 Nind and his wife moved to Queensland, Australia. He was for a time in North Queensland where he was active in exploration. On 4 October 1873 he accompanied George Elphinstone Dalrymple and Sub-Inspector Robert Johnstone in entering the Glady's River.

In conjunction with Mr Fursden, Nind established a farm on the Pimpama River of about 2000 acres with about 80 acres of sugarcane.

He became a Member of the Queensland Legislative Assembly representing the electorate of Logan from 28 November 1873 to 27 May 1874 and from 8 June 1874 to 3 April 1875. The first election was declared void. He was elected to the Legislative Assembly by a very small majority.

== Later life ==
In 1876 Nind returned to England as an emigration lecturer appointed by the Queensland Government. He died on 9 March 1896 at Lashlake House, Thame, Oxfordshire, England aged 64.

Nind Street in Southport is named after him.

== See also ==
- List of Oxford University Boat Race crews

Parliament of Queensland
New seat	Member for Logan; 1873–1874	Succeeded by Himself
Preceded by Himself	Member for Logan; 1874–1875	Succeeded by Adam Black
