= Electoral district of Warrego =

State electoral district of Queensland, Australia

Warrego Queensland—Legislative Assembly
- Electoral map of Warrego 2017
- State: Queensland
- Created: 1865
- MP: Ann Leahy
- Party: Liberal National
- Namesake: Warrego River
- Electors: 29,307 (2020)
- Area: 337,812 km^{2} (130,429.9 sq mi)
- Demographic: Rural
- Coordinates: 26°52′S 146°9′E
Electorates around Warrego:
South Australia	Gregory	Callide; Nanango
South Australia	Warrego	Condamine; Southern Downs
South Australia	New South Wales	New South Wales

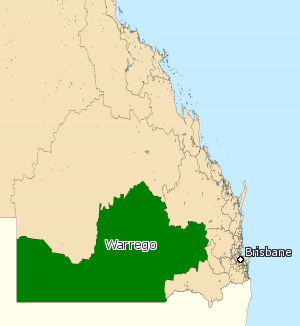
2008 electoral map of Warrego

Warrego is an electoral district of the Legislative Assembly in the Australian state of Queensland.

The electorate lies in the extreme southwest of Queensland, running along the western part of the border with New South Wales. It includes the large town of Dalby, as well as the rural centres of Surat, Roma, Tara, Charleville, Augathella, St George and Cunnamulla.

== History ==
The electoral district of Warrego was created by the Additional Members Act of 1864 which introduced six new single-member electorates. A by-election was held to fill the seat. The nomination date was 18 March 1865 and the election was held on 25 March 1865.

Warrego was, as with the rest of the state, held by independents and loose groupings of members around the government of the day until the first years of the twentieth century, when the partisan system took hold. It then became a stronghold of the centre-left Labor Party, which held it without interruption from 1908 to 1974. The decline of the rural working class gradually changed the demographics of the electorate, however, and in 1974 it was swept up in a massive landslide for the National Party.

It remained a marginal National seat for the next two decades, even at the height of the popularity of the Bjelke-Petersen government. However, it stayed in National hands even after Labor ended the long National run in government. The "one vote one value" reforms ahead of the 1992 election gave the Nationals a 13 percent notional majority, making the seat safe National on paper. The Nationals significantly increased their hold on the electorate thereafter, and it was now one of the most conservative seats in Queensland. Since then, the National hold on the seat has been only remotely threatened once, in 2001. It remained a conservative stronghold after the LNP was formed from a merger with the Liberals in 2009. The current member, Ann Leahy, has held the seat since 2015.

== Members for Warrego ==
Member	Party	Term
Frederick Forbes	Unaligned	1865–1867
Graham Mylne	Unaligned	1867–1868
Sir Arthur Hodgson	Unaligned	1868–1869
Sir Thomas McIlwraith	Ministerialist	1870–1871
Archibald Buchanan	Ministerialist	1871–1873
William Henry Walsh	Ministerialist	1873–1878
Ernest James Stevens	Independent	1878–1883
John Donaldson	Independent/Ministerialist	1883–1888
Richard Casey	Unaligned	1888–1893
James Crombie	Ministerialist	1893–1898
William Hood	Ministerialist	1898–1899
David Bowman	Labour	1899–1902
Patrick Leahy	Ministerialist/Opposition	1902–1907
George Barber	Labour	1907
Patrick Leahy	Ministerialist/Opposition	1907–1908
Harry Coyne	Labor	1908–1923
Randolph Bedford	Labor	1923–1941
Harry O'Shea	Labor	1941–1950
John Dufficy	Labor	1951–1969
Jack Aiken	Labor	1969–1974
Neil Turner	National	1974–1986
Howard Hobbs	National	1986–2008
Howard Hobbs	Liberal National	2008–2015
Ann Leahy	Liberal National	2015–present

== Election results ==
2024 Queensland state election: Warrego
Party	Candidate	Votes	%	±%
Liberal National	Ann Leahy	16,135	61.1	+5.2
Labor	Jack Hargreaves	3,622	13.7	−6.0
One Nation	Hayley Titmarsh	2,424	9.2	+0.4
Family First	Christopher Schenk	1,396	5.3	+5.3
Legalise Cannabis	Angela Adams	1,148	4.4	+4.3
Independent	Daniel Gill	1,082	4.1	+4.1
Greens	Ian Mazlin	580	2.2	−0.1
Total formal votes		26,387	96.2	
Informal votes		1,045	3.8	
Turnout		27,432		
Two-party-preferred result
Liberal National	Ann Leahy	20,542	77.8	+4.7
Labor	Jack Hargreaves	5,845	22.2	−4.7
Liberal National hold		Swing	+4.7	
