= Garowie =

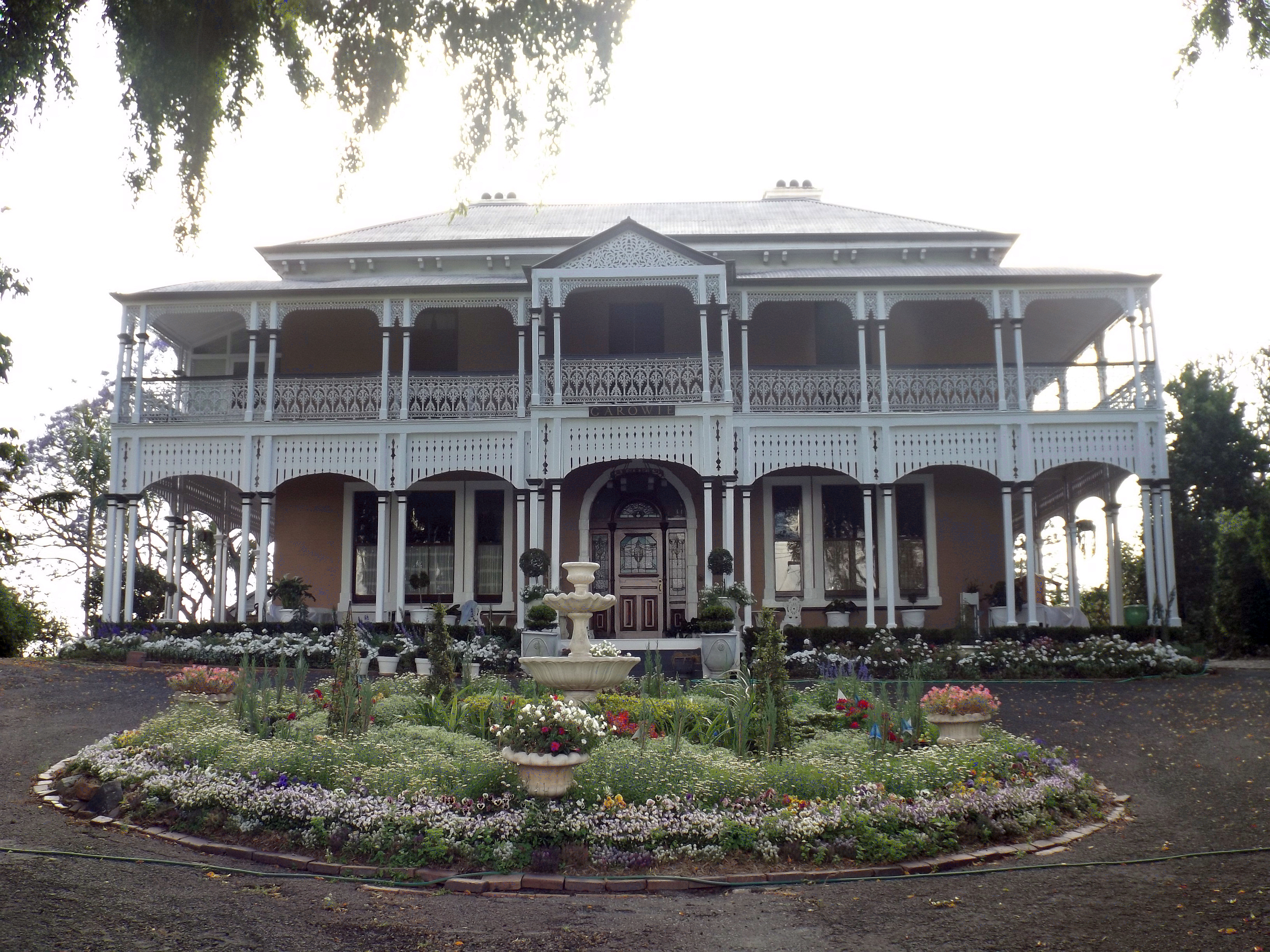
- Building in 2015

- Location within Queensland Location within Australia
- 27.6218°S 152.7716°E
- Location: 59 Whitehill Road, Eastern Heights, City of Ipswich, Queensland, Australia

History
- Design period: 1870s - 1890s (late 19th century)
- Built: c. 1888
- Built for: James Clarke Cribb

Site notes
- Architect: Samuel Shenton

Queensland Heritage Register
- Official name: Garowie
- Type: state heritage (built, landscape)
- Designated: 21 October 1992
- Reference no.: 600599
- Significant period: 1880s (fabric); 1880s-1920s (historical)
- Significant components: fence/wall - perimeter, residential accommodation - main house, trees/plantings
- Builders: Robert Wilson and Co

Garowie is a heritage-listed villa at 59 Whitehill Road, Eastern Heights, City of Ipswich, Queensland, Australia. It was designed by architect Samuel Shenton and built c. 1888 by Robert Wilson and Co. It was added to the Queensland Heritage Register on 21 October 1992.

== History ==
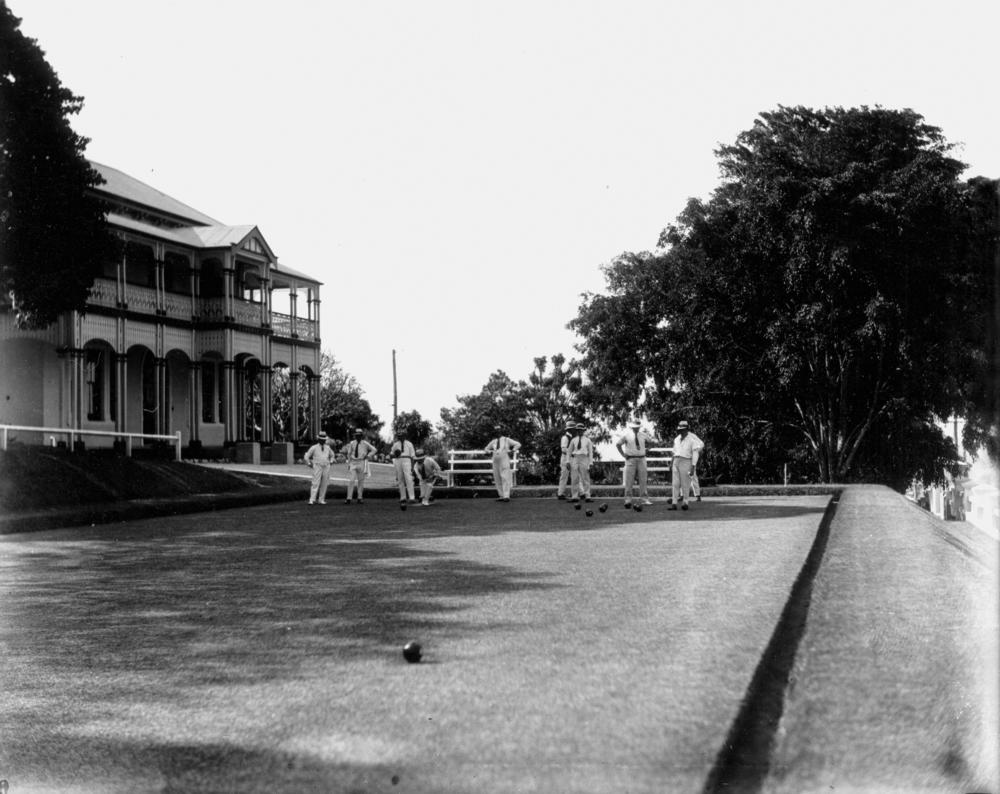
Playing bowls on the lawn at Garowie, Ipswich, 1926

Garowie, a grand two-storey residence, was one of several mansions built on the Limestone Hill ridge. It was built by Mesrs Robt. Wilson and Co for James Clarke Cribb, the son of Benjamin Cribb who founded the Cribb and Foote business, and his wife Alice née Browne. The house was designed by Ipswich builder and architect, Samuel Shenton, and was completed in 1888. It is said to have been modelled on the Denmark Hill home of Benjamin Cribb, Gooloowan.

The architect Samuel Shenton, arrived in Ipswich in March 1851 and began work as a carpenter and building contractor. Among his early contracts were Dr Challinor's house and shop in Brisbane Street and fitting out the first Presbyterian Church (1853). Shenton made some significant improvements to central Ipswich in the 1860s with the School of Arts and the Lands Office. During this time he was preparing plans, specifications and quantities and in 1879 his contracting business was taken over by Worley and Whitehead. Shenton practised as an architect from 1879 until 1889 when his practice was taken over by employee George Brockwell Gill. Shenton subsequently became heavily involved in community and business ventures as well as local politics. He was an alderman for many years and the Mayor of Ipswich from 1871 to 1872 and 1889. He died in Ipswich on 3 July 1893. Some of his other more notable and extant works are the Central Congregational Church Manse (1882–83) in Quarry Street, and Faerieknowe (Fairy Knoll) for E.W. Hargraves.

James Cribb served the family company until 1904, when he was elected to the Bundamba Shire Council. He was a Member of the Queensland Legislative Assembly for Rosewood and Bundamba (which later became the seat of Bremer), serving a total of 19 years as a state parliamentarian. Cribb was also a member of the board of the Ipswich Hospital, a director of the Ipswich Gas and Coke Company and the Queensland Woollen Mills, a trustee of the Ipswich and superintendent of the Congregational Sunday School.

After James Cribb died in May 1926, his brother Harry bought the house. Harry Cribb was a state level champion tennis player. Garowie once had a tennis court in the grounds on the southern side of the house which was converted into a bowling green during the mid 1920s. This portion of the grounds as well as the portion to the north of the house were subdivided and separate residences were built. The original fence was replaced by a stone masonry fence at around this time. Large gates of red cedar were installed. Henry Cribb died in July 1944, and the house was sold to Duncan Robson. He converted the house into 7 flats, one being the detached billiard room.

Garowie was then resold three times and purchased by K V McDonnell in 1951. He subdivided the original 3.5 acre property into 9 separate blocks and built a home on what had been the bowling green, incorporating the original bowls pavilion. A tennis court with fluorescent lighting was built on what had been the orchard, the rose garden to the north of the house became two blocks and were sold together, as was the carriage house. The horse yards, fronting Tower Street, were eventually sold as four housing blocks.

Subsequent maintenance at Garowie included removal, stripping, repainting and replacement of the cast iron balustrading from the upper verandah, with stripping of the multiple coats of lead paint and recoating with lead free paint. The remainder of the building was repainted inside and out, a fire escape added from the upper floor and a row of carports built behind the main building. The rendered brick front fence, which was leaning outwards, was anchored to buried concrete logs and has moved no further.

In 1970 the house was bought by Dr and Mrs J Thomas, who began restoring it back to a single dwelling.

In the 1980s the home was bought by Edwin & Loretta Stoyle where they raised their three children.

In December 2003, the home was bought by the Frank family. On arrival, the property had been stripped of all floor coverings, drapes and all lighting—only light bulbs remained. Since purchase, the property has been extensively restored including underpinning, all verandahs replaced, complete replacement of the back wall which had been eaten-out by white ants, gutters replaced, all new antique 1800s lights/chandeliers installed, painted, cedar restored, and grounds landscaped.

The residence was originally brick, and was rendered after 1919. The billiard room, on the southern side, has been relocated. The original fretwork on the front portico is missing, the current fretwork being copied from another residence, Lakemba, at 14 Chelmsford Avenue, Ipswich.

The name Garowie is supposedly an Aboriginal word for Fig Tree Camp. There are several very large Moreton Bay Fig trees on the original property.

== Description ==
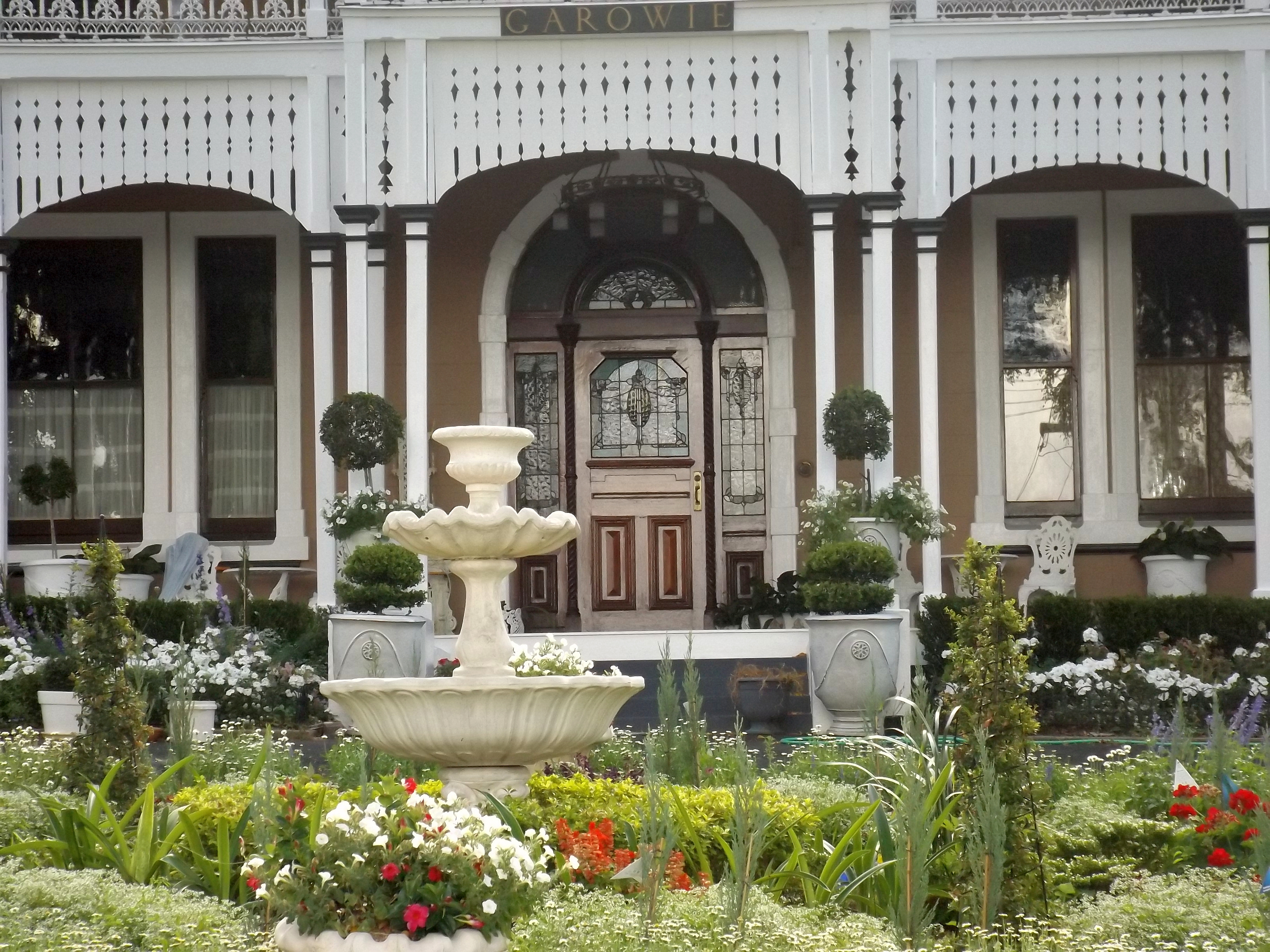
Front entrance, 2015

The house is situated on the western side of Whitehill Road with an easterly frontage to the street. The house has a cement rendered, brick core, which is surrounded by verandahs at both levels. The lower level verandah features paired support columns and has no balustrades. A scalloped fringe of timber battens extends between the support columns, just beneath the upper level's balustrades. At the upper level, the paired supports are spanned by intricate, cast iron lace balustrading. The house has a corrugated iron hipped roof with stepped down and slightly convex roofing over its upper level verandah. Its entry, facing east, is defined by a central gabled portico, with a fretwork pediment. A decorative, masonry fence and mature plantings, many along the property's front boundary, screen the house.

== Heritage listing ==
Garowie was listed on the Queensland Heritage Register on 21 October 1992 having satisfied the following criteria.

The place is important in demonstrating the evolution or pattern of Queensland's history.

Garowie is important in demonstrating the pattern of affluent residential development in Ipswich in the latter nineteenth century by influential members of the local community made successful by the strength of Ipswich's industry and commerce.

The place is important in demonstrating the principal characteristics of a particular class of cultural places.

Garowie is also a good example of a late Victorian Queensland mansion with evidence of its extensive original grounds marked out by the masonry fence line along the frontage of Whitehill Road.

The house has special association as an example of the work of Ipswich builder and architect Samuel Shenton, who was one of the earliest prominent architects in Ipswich.

The place is important because of its aesthetic significance.

Garowie is a striking grand residence with important streetscape value particularly for its established gardens and decorative two-storey facade with iron-lace balustrading and scalloped timber battens and gabled portico. Its prominent position and scale make it a city landmark.

The place has a special association with the life or work of a particular person, group or organisation of importance in Queensland's history.

It has special association with the Cribb family, built as their family home, in particular its first owner James Clarke Cribb, who served in local and state government. The Cribbs have been a prominent family in Ipswich since its early settlement involved in business, politics and education in the city and in Queensland. They are most notable for the long running department store, Cribb & Foote.
