= Electoral results for the district of Bremer =

Queensland, Australia, district election results

This is a list of electoral results for the electoral district of Bremer in Queensland state elections.

== Members for Bremer ==
First incarnation (1873–1878)
Member	Party	Term
John Malbon Thompson	Unaligned	1873–1878
Second incarnation (1912–1960)
James Clarke Cribb	Liberal	1912–1915
Frank Cooper	Labor	1915–1946
Jim Donald	Labor	1946–1960

== Election results ==
=== Elections in the 1950s ===
1957 Queensland state election: Bremer
Party	Candidate	Votes	%	±%
Labor	Jim Donald	6,692	59.7	−13.0
Liberal	George Groth	2,938	26.2	−1.1
Queensland Labor	Frank Corbutt	1,580	14.1	+14.1
Total formal votes		11,210	98.8	+0.2
Informal votes		132	1.2	−0.2
Turnout		11,342	95.9	+1.6
Labor hold		Swing	−3.2	

1956 Queensland state election: Bremer
Party	Candidate	Votes	%	±%
Labor	Jim Donald	7,826	72.7	−27.3
Liberal	George Groth	2,938	27.3	+27.3
Total formal votes		10,764	98.6	
Informal votes		149	1.4	
Turnout		10,913	94.3	
Labor hold		Swing	N/A	

1953 Queensland state election: Bremer
Party	Candidate	Votes	%	±%
Labor	Jim Donald	unopposed		
Labor hold		Swing		

1950 Queensland state election: Bremer
Party	Candidate	Votes	%	±%
Labor	Jim Donald	6,100	65.8	
Liberal	Alan Chambers	3,170	34.2	
Total formal votes		9,270	99.3	
Informal votes		63	0.7	
Turnout		9,333	95.6	
Labor hold		Swing		

=== Elections in the 1940s ===
1947 Queensland state election: Bremer
Party	Candidate	Votes	%	±%
Labor	Jim Donald	6,715	69.3	−30.7
People's Party	Henry Davidson	2,974	30.7	+30.7
Total formal votes		9,689	98.8	
Informal votes		116	1.2	
Turnout		9,805	91.4	
Labor hold		Swing	N/A	

1946 Bremer state by-election
Party	Candidate	Votes	%	±%
Labor	Jim Donald	5,908	63.1	−36.9
People's Party	Harold Shapcott	3,461	36.9	+36.9
Total formal votes		9,376	99.4	
Informal votes		50	0.6	
Turnout		9,426	87.2	
Labor hold		Swing	N/A	

1944 Queensland state election: Bremer
Party	Candidate	Votes	%	±%
Labor	Frank Cooper	unopposed		
Labor hold		Swing		

1941 Queensland state election: Bremer
Party	Candidate	Votes	%	±%
Labor	Frank Cooper	7,141	83.5	+0.1
Communist	Geordie Burns	1,411	16.5	−0.1
Total formal votes		8,552	97.2	+0.3
Informal votes		249	2.8	−0.3
Turnout		8,801	94.0	−1.0
Labor hold		Swing	+0.1	

=== Elections in the 1930s ===
1938 Queensland state election: Bremer
Party	Candidate	Votes	%	±%
Labor	Frank Cooper	7,099	83.4	−4.1
Communist	Geordie Burns	1,414	16.6	+4.1
Total formal votes		8,513	96.9	−0.5
Informal votes		276	3.1	+0.5
Turnout		8,789	95.0	+0.4
Labor hold		Swing	−4.1	

1935 Queensland state election: Bremer
Party	Candidate	Votes	%	±%
Labor	Frank Cooper	7,166	87.5	
Communist	Geordie Burns	1,026	12.5	
Total formal votes		8,192	97.4	
Informal votes		220	2.6	
Turnout		8,412	94.6	
Labor hold		Swing		

1932 Queensland state election: Bremer
Party	Candidate	Votes	%	±%
Labor	Frank Cooper	unopposed		
Labor hold		Swing		

=== Elections in the 1920s ===
1929 Queensland state election: Bremer
Party	Candidate	Votes	%	±%
Labor	Frank Cooper	3,080	51.2	−15.0
CPNP	Thomas Mitchell	2,933	48.8	+15.0
Total formal votes		6,082	98.9	0.0
Informal votes		69	1.1	0.0
Turnout		6,082	92.5	−1.9
Labor hold		Swing	−15.0	

1926 Queensland state election: Bremer
Party	Candidate	Votes	%	±%
Labor	Frank Cooper	3,888	66.2	+10.6
CPNP	Kenneth McGill	1,988	33.8	−9.7
Total formal votes		5,876	98.9	+0.4
Informal votes		68	1.1	−0.4
Turnout		5,944	94.4	+1.8
Labor hold		Swing	N/A	

1923 Queensland state election: Bremer
Party	Candidate	Votes	%	±%
Labor	Frank Cooper	3,086	55.6	−5.9
United	Andrew Wright	2,417	43.5	+8.7
Independent	John Budd	51	0.9	+0.9
Total formal votes		5,554	98.5	−0.2
Informal votes		86	1.5	+0.2
Turnout		5,640	92.6	+0.2
Labor hold		Swing	N/A	

1920 Queensland state election: Bremer
Party	Candidate	Votes	%	±%
Labor	Frank Cooper	3,667	61.5	−4.5
National	Alfred Stephenson	2,078	34.8	+0.8
Industrialist	Albert Welsby	222	3.7	+3.7
Total formal votes		5,967	98.7	−0.1
Informal votes		79	1.3	+0.1
Turnout		6,046	92.4	+3.1
Labor hold		Swing	N/A	

=== Elections in the 1910s ===
1918 Queensland state election: Bremer
Party	Candidate	Votes	%	±%
Labor	Frank Cooper	3,678	66.0	+4.5
National	E. Maurice Little	1,897	34.0	−4.5
Total formal votes		5,575	98.8	−0.1
Informal votes		65	1.2	+0.1
Turnout		5,640	89.3	−4.7
Labor hold		Swing	+4.5	

1915 Queensland state election: Bremer
Party	Candidate	Votes	%	±%
Labor	Frank Cooper	3,157	61.5	+11.7
Liberal	Felix Barbat	1,974	38.5	−11.7
Total formal votes		5,131	98.9	−0.1
Informal votes		55	1.1	+0.1
Turnout		5,186	94.0	+12.4
Labor gain from Liberal		Swing	+11.7	

1912 Queensland state election: Bremer
Party	Candidate	Votes	%	±%
Liberal	James Cribb	1,860	50.2	
Labor	William Hefferan	1,844	49.8	
Total formal votes		3,704	99.0	
Informal votes		36	1.0	
Turnout		3,740	81.6	
Liberal hold		Swing		
