= Electoral results for the district of Wolston =

Queensland, Australia, district election results

This is a list of electoral results for the electoral district of Wolston in Queensland state elections.

== Members for Wolston ==
| Member | Party | Term |
|---|---|---|
| Evan Marginson | Labor | 1972–1977 |
| Bob Gibbs | Labor | 1977–1992 |

== Election results ==
=== Elections in the 1980s ===
1989 Queensland state election: Wolston
| Party | Candidate | Votes | % | ±% |
|---|---|---|---|---|
| Labor | Bob Gibbs | 13,574 | 66.9 | +10.3 |
| Liberal | Hendrik Schimmel | 6,724 | 33.1 | +8.7 |
| Total formal votes | | 20,298 | 93.3 | −2.2 |
| Informal votes | | 1,466 | 6.7 | +2.2 |
| Turnout | | 21,764 | 90.7 | −0.1 |
| Labor hold | | Swing | +9.2 | |

1986 Queensland state election: Wolston
| Party | Candidate | Votes | % | ±% |
|---|---|---|---|---|
| Labor | Bob Gibbs | 10,207 | 56.6 | −4.7 |
| Liberal | Hendrik Schimmel | 4,410 | 24.4 | −14.3 |
| National | Ron Jakeman | 3,426 | 19.0 | +19.0 |
| Total formal votes | | 18,043 | 95.5 | |
| Informal votes | | 855 | 4.5 | |
| Turnout | | 18,898 | 90.8 | |
Two-party-preferred result
| Labor | Bob Gibbs | 10,411 | 57.7 | −3.3 |
| Liberal | Hendrik Schimmel | 7,632 | 42.3 | +3.3 |
| Labor hold | | Swing | −3.3 | |

1983 Queensland state election: Wolston
| Party | Candidate | Votes | % | ±% |
|---|---|---|---|---|
| Labor | Bob Gibbs | 10,251 | 64.3 | +4.9 |
| Liberal | Bob Harper | 5,687 | 35.7 | +11.9 |
| Total formal votes | | 15,938 | 96.5 | −1.4 |
| Informal votes | | 572 | 3.5 | +1.4 |
| Turnout | | 16,510 | 91.0 | +3.2 |
| Labor hold | | Swing | +3.1 | |

1980 Queensland state election: Wolston
| Party | Candidate | Votes | % | ±% |
|---|---|---|---|---|
| Labor | Bob Gibbs | 8,702 | 59.4 | +1.2 |
| Liberal | Bob Harper | 3,485 | 23.8 | −1.0 |
| National | Roy Buchanan | 2,460 | 16.8 | −0.2 |
| Total formal votes | | 14,647 | 97.9 | +0.2 |
| Informal votes | | 320 | 2.1 | −0.2 |
| Turnout | | 14,967 | 87.8 | −3.3 |
Two-party-preferred result
| Labor | Bob Gibbs | 8,965 | 61.2 | +0.6 |
| Liberal | Bob Harper | 5,682 | 38.8 | −0.6 |
| Labor hold | | Swing | +0.6 | |

=== Elections in the 1970s ===
1977 Queensland state election: Wolston
| Party | Candidate | Votes | % | ±% |
|---|---|---|---|---|
| Labor | Bob Gibbs | 8,157 | 58.2 | +10.1 |
| Liberal | Owen Nugent | 3,473 | 24.8 | −18.2 |
| National | Ruth Buchanan | 2,385 | 17.0 | +17.0 |
| Total formal votes | | 14,015 | 97.7 | |
| Informal votes | | 336 | 2.3 | |
| Turnout | | 14,351 | 91.1 | |
Two-party-preferred result
| Labor | Bob Gibbs | 8,491 | 60.6 | +10.5 |
| Liberal | Owen Nugent | 5,524 | 39.4 | −10.5 |
| Labor hold | | Swing | +10.5 | |

1974 Queensland state election: Wolston
| Party | Candidate | Votes | % | ±% |
|---|---|---|---|---|
| Labor | Evan Marginson | 7,111 | 48.1 | −17.3 |
| Liberal | Dirk Plooy | 6,363 | 43.0 | +21.7 |
| Independent | Albert Blaine | 855 | 5.8 | +5.8 |
| Queensland Labor | Leonard Maguire | 463 | 3.1 | −4.9 |
| Total formal votes | | 14,792 | 97.5 | +0.2 |
| Informal votes | | 376 | 2.5 | −0.2 |
| Turnout | | 15,168 | 87.4 | −4.8 |
Two-party-preferred result
| Labor | Evan Marginson | 7,742 | 52.3 | −18.0 |
| Liberal | Dirk Plooy | 7,050 | 47.6 | +18.0 |
| Labor hold | | Swing | −18.0 | |

1972 Queensland state election: Wolston
| Party | Candidate | Votes | % | ±% |
|---|---|---|---|---|
| Labor | Evan Marginson | 7,973 | 65.4 | +7.0 |
| Liberal | Dirk Plooy | 2,595 | 21.3 | −16.2 |
| Queensland Labor | Leonard Maguire | 971 | 8.0 | +3.9 |
| Independent | George Whyte | 653 | 5.4 | +5.4 |
| Total formal votes | | 12,192 | 97.3 | |
| Informal votes | | 334 | 2.7 | |
| Turnout | | 12,526 | 92.2 | |
Two-party-preferred result
| Labor | Evan Marginson | 8,572 | 70.3 | +8.7 |
| Liberal | Dirk Plooy | 3,620 | 29.7 | −8.7 |
| Labor hold | | Swing | +8.7 | |
