= Electoral results for the district of Ipswich East =

Electoral results

This is a list of electoral results for the electoral district of Ipswich East in Queensland state elections.

== Members for Ipswich East ==
Member	Party	Term
Jim Donald	Labor	1960–1969
Evan Marginson	Labor	1969–1972

== Election results ==
=== Elections in the 1960s ===
1969 Queensland state election: Ipswich East
Party	Candidate	Votes	%	±%
Labor	Evan Marginson	8,889	58.4	−10.1
Liberal	John Shapcott	5,714	37.5	+13.1
Queensland Labor	Peter Grant	620	4.1	+4.1
Total formal votes		15,223	97.5	−1.0
Informal votes		388	2.5	+1.0
Turnout		15,611	93.1	+2.7
Two-party-preferred result
Labor	Evan Marginson	9,059	59.5	−13.3
Liberal	John Shapcott	6,164	40.5	+13.3
Labor hold		Swing	−13.3	

1966 Queensland state election: Ipswich East
Party	Candidate	Votes	%	±%
Labor	Jim Donald	9,845	68.5	−1.9
Liberal	Hedley Scriven	3,506	24.4	−2.2
Independent	Douglas Wood	1,014	7.1	+7.1
Total formal votes		14,365	98.5	−0.5
Informal votes		217	1.5	+0.5
Turnout		14,582	90.4	−5.2
Two-party-preferred result
Labor	Jim Donald	10,453	72.8	+1.7
Liberal	Hedley Scriven	3,912	27.2	−1.7
Labor hold		Swing	+1.7	

1963 Queensland state election: Ipswich East
Party	Candidate	Votes	%	±%
Labor	Jim Donald	9,496	70.4	+1.2
Liberal	Hedley Scriven	3,592	26.6	+1.9
Queensland Labor	Andrij Janicky	340	2.5	−3.6
Social Credit	Vic Robb	67	0.5	+0.5
Total formal votes		13,495	99.0	−0.2
Informal votes		135	1.0	+0.2
Turnout		13,630	95.6	−0.2
Two-party-preferred result
Labor	Jim Donald	9,593	71.1	
Liberal	Hedley Scriven	3,902	28.9	
Labor hold		Swing	N/A	

1960 Queensland state election: Ipswich East
Party	Candidate	Votes	%	±%
Labor	Jim Donald	8,596	69.2	
Liberal	Hedley Scriven	3,068	24.7	
Queensland Labor	Charles Archer	761	6.1	
Total formal votes		12,425	99.2	
Informal votes		101	0.8	
Turnout		12,526	95.8	
Labor win		(new seat)		
