= Edwin Maurice Little =

Australian soldier and activist (1893–1938)

Edwin Maurice Little (6 July 1893 – 19 August 1938) was an Australian soldier, writer, and activist for disabled people. Born in Barcaldine, Queensland, he was educated at Brisbane Grammar School before becoming a teacher at the Brisbane Normal School. At the outbreak of World War I, Little enlisted in the military at the age of 21.

Little was assigned to the 15th battalion and spent some time encamped in Egypt before arriving at Gallipoli on the afternoon of 25 April 1915. On 14 May, Little was given a field commission as a 2nd Lieutenant, due to the loss of officers in the unit due to Turkish snipers and bombs. On 26 May, Little was badly injured defending his trench against a Turkish attack; when a bomb that he was holding exploded in his hand. He was evacuated to a hospital ship, where both of his eyes had to be removed, and his right hand amputated. Little's family in Australia were given conflicting reports on his injuries, with one report stating he was not seriously injured, while another listed him as killed in action.

While recovering from his injuries, Little married a nurse, Miss Bessy Crowther. Upon his return to Australia, Little tried to enter politics, standing as a Nationalist candidate in the Electoral district of Bremer at the 1918 election, but he was defeated by future Labor Premier Frank Cooper. Little then turned his attention to writing, contributing prolifically to such publications such as The Queenslander on a variety of topics, including short stories and advocacy for disabled persons. At the end of the war, Little became the inaugural President of his branch of the Returned Soldiers and Sailors Imperial League, an organisation that later became the RSL.
