= Central Congregational Church Manse =

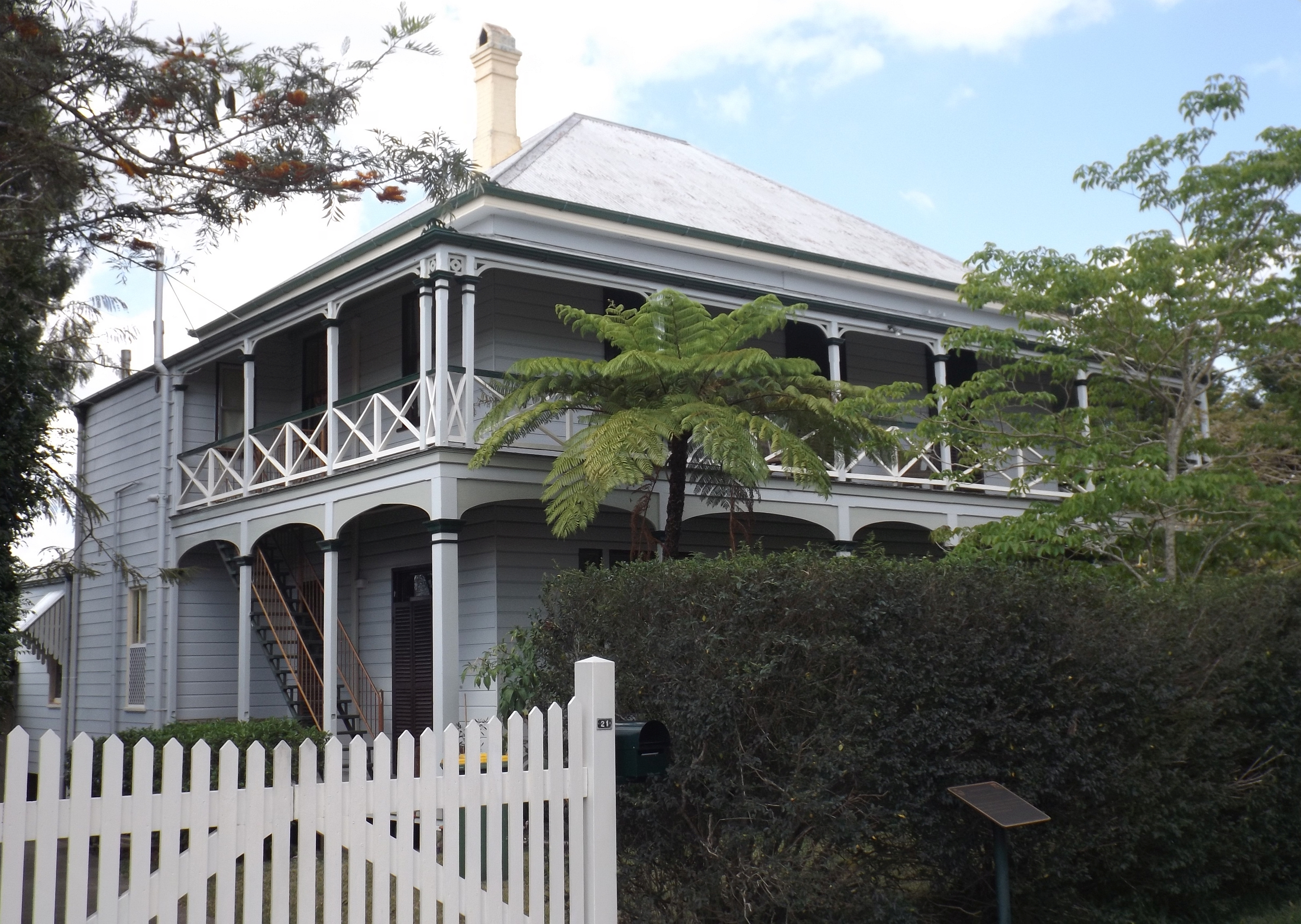
- Building in 2015

- Location within Queensland Location within Australia
- 27.6219°S 152.7618°E
- Location: 21 Quarry Street, Ipswich, City of Ipswich, Queensland, Australia

History
- Design period: 1870s–1890s (late 19th century)
- Built: 1883

Site notes
- Architect: Samuel Shenton

Queensland Heritage Register
- Official name: Central Congregational Church Manse
- Type: state heritage (landscape, built)
- Designated: 21 October 1992
- Reference no.: 600594
- Significant period: 1880s (fabric); 1880s–1930s (historical)
- Significant components: residential accommodation – manse, garden/grounds
- Builders: Samuel Shenton

Central Congregational Church Manse is a heritage-listed manse at 21 Quarry Street, Ipswich, City of Ipswich, Queensland, Australia. It was designed and built in 1883 by Samuel Shenton. It was added to the Queensland Heritage Register on 21 October 1992.

== History ==
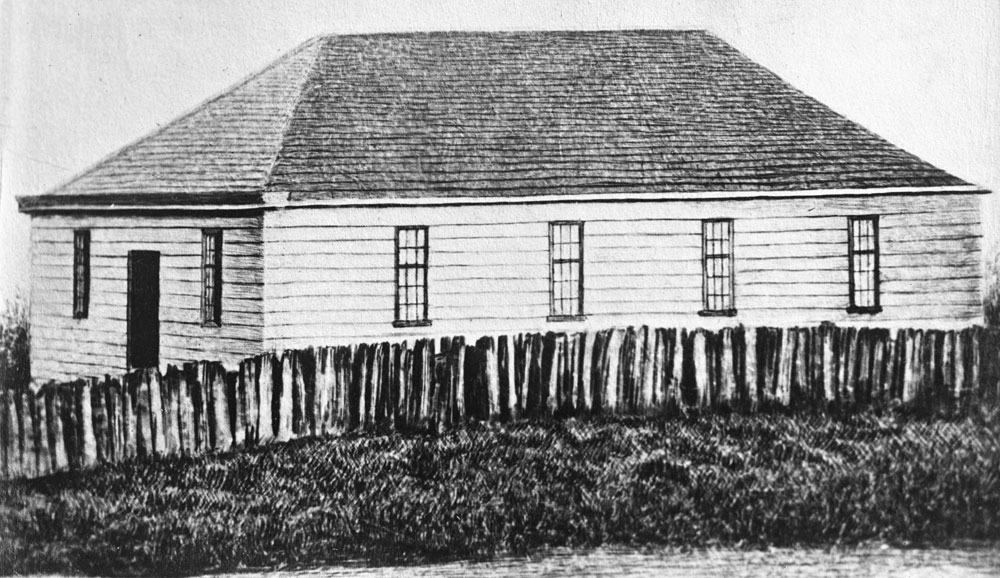
First Congregational Church, Brisbane Street, Ipswich, circa 1860s

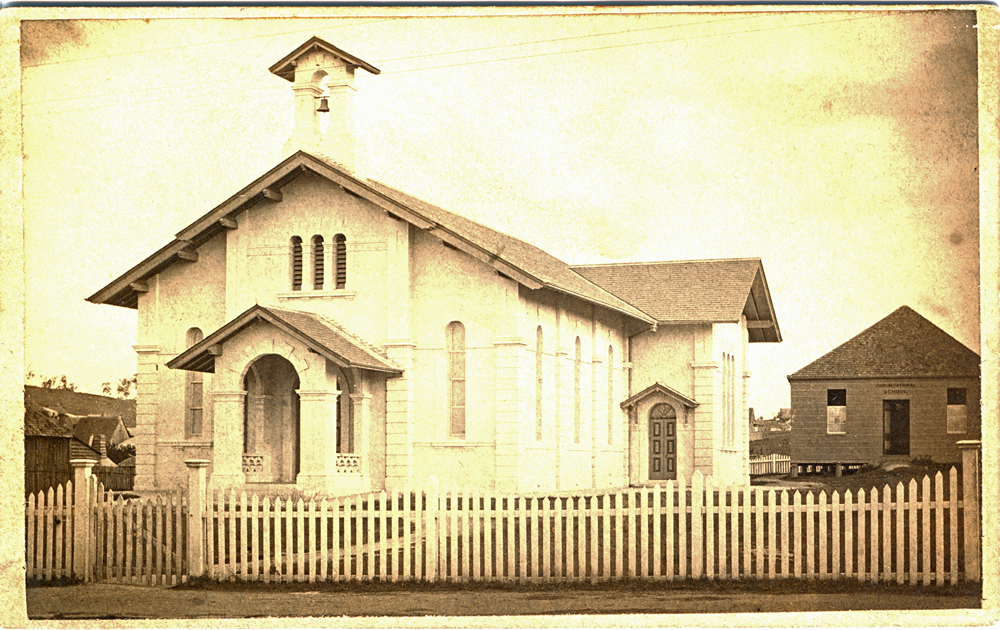
Second Congregational Church, Brisbane Street opposite Wharf Street, Ipswich, 1877

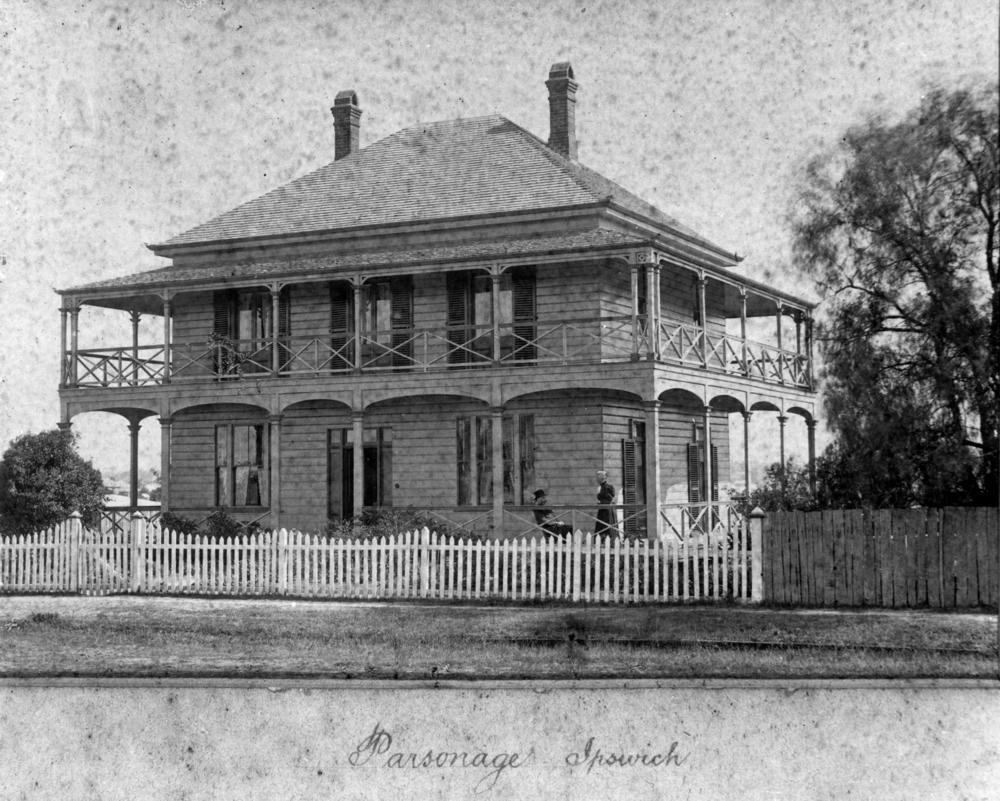
Congregational manse, ca. 1896

This two storey timber residence was built as the manse for the pastors of the Congregational Church of Ipswich. The Congregational Church Yearbook of 1883 describes the Manse during its construction as follows: "The edifice will be a two storeyed weather-board house with verandah balcony all round, containing 12 rooms and finished in a style that will do credit to the denomination". It was designed and erected by architect/builder Samuel Shenton, himself a member of the Congregational Church, costing £1221/18/7. Construction of the Manse was commenced and finished in 1883.

The Congregational Church of Ipswich was formed on 2 June 1854 as a union of necessity between the Baptist and Independent faiths due to small numbers of each in the pioneer town of Ipswich. The Ipswich Congregational Church was the first Congregational parish in Queensland and it soon expanded throughout the state in the later decades of the nineteenth century. The church was a fiercely independent denomination refusing to accept any government subsidies or land grants. In 1854 the Congregational Church established a building committee and in 1855 the first congregational church building in Ipswich was built by Samuel Shenton who later designed the manse, and who was a founding member of the Congregational Church. It was situated on the southern side of Brisbane Street near East Street and was a simple single story timber building.

In 1870 a new church was constructed to the design of Samuel Shenton adjacent to the old church which was used as a Sunday School. By this time the parish was known as the Central Congregational Church. The new church cost £2,110 and survived until February 1953 when it was destroyed by fire. The site of the church was bought by the Atlantic Oil Co and became the site of a garage and is now the site of Coles supermarket and carpark. Another congregational church was erected in East Street which is now the East Street City Uniting Church.

In 1936–37 the Manse was sold by the Church and was turned into a number of flats. In 1950 twelve and half perches of the manse grounds was resumed for road works and other sections of the land were subdivided.

Externally the residence remains remarkably intact displaying virtually no changes since a photograph taken in 1896 apart from extra vertical balustrading on the upper storey. The manse remains as the only evidence of the 19th-century building activities of the Central Congregational Church in Ipswich.

The architect Samuel Shenton was one of the earliest prominent architects in Ipswich whose works are well known in the city and the surrounding area. He arrived in Ipswich in March 1851 and began work as a carpenter and building contractor. Among his early contracts were Dr Challinor's house and shop in Brisbane Street and fitting out the first Presbyterian Church (1853). Shenton made some significant improvements to central Ipswich in the 1860s with the School of Arts and the Lands Office. During this time he was preparing plans, specifications and quantities and in 1879 his contracting business was taken over by Worley and Whitehead. Shenton practiced solely as an architect from 1879 until 1889 when his practice was taken over by employee George Brockwell Gill. Shenton subsequently became heavily involved in community and business ventures as well as local politics. He was an alderman for many years and the Mayor of Ipswich from 1871–1872 and 1889. He died in Ipswich on 3 July 1893. Another of his more notable and extant works is Faerieknowe (Fairy Knoll) built for EW Hargraves.

== Heritage listing ==
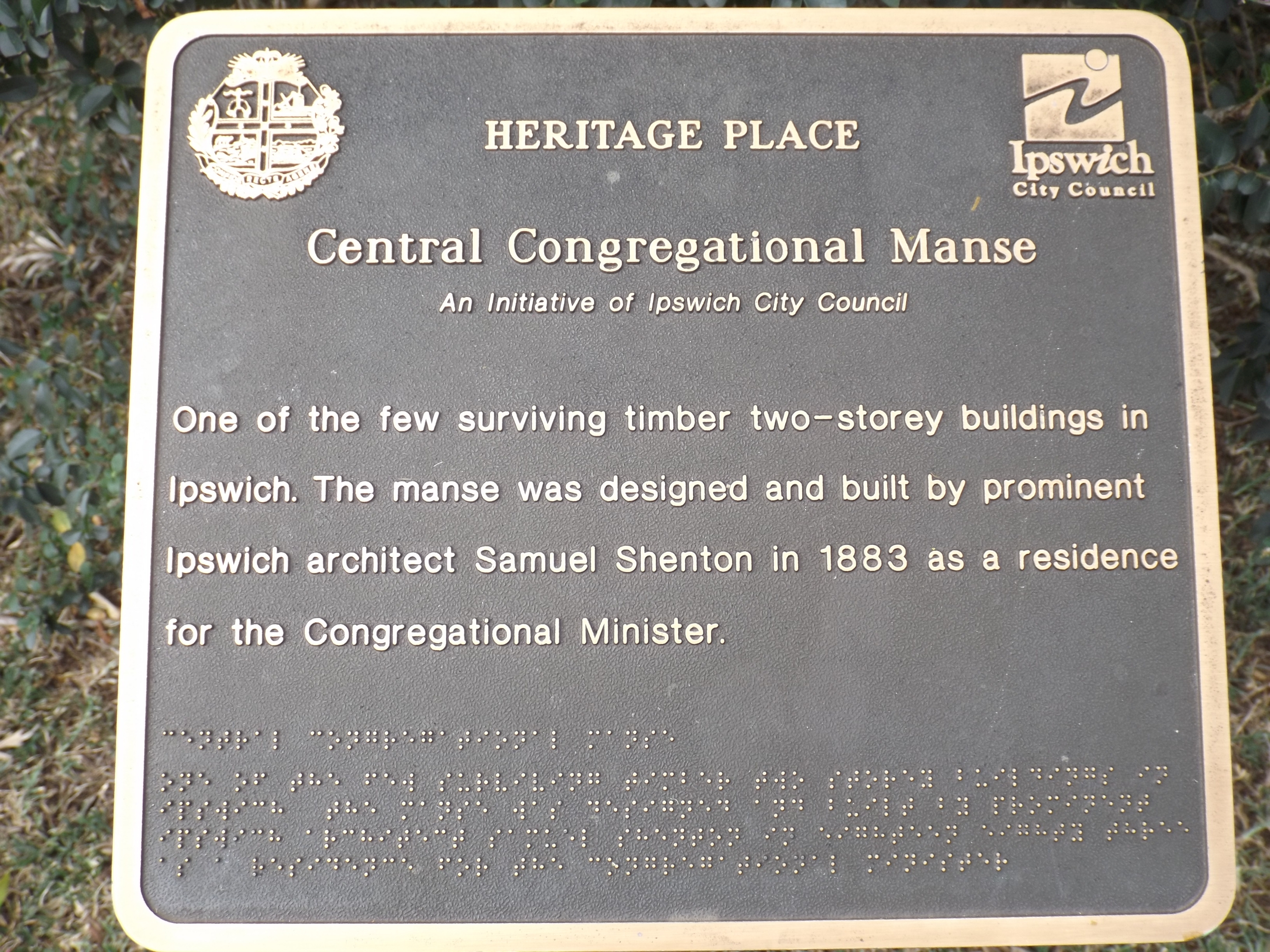
Ipswich City Council, plaque, 2015

Central Congregational Church Manse was listed on the Queensland Heritage Register on 21 October 1992 having satisfied the following criteria.

The place is important in demonstrating the evolution or pattern of Queensland's history.

The former Congregational Church Manse is important in demonstrating the early development of the Congregational Church in Ipswich and in Queensland. The Congregational Church was one of the earliest independent denominations established in Queensland. Few Congregational parishes exist today due to the merge of many Congregationalist parishes into the Uniting Church in the 20th century. The former manse is significant for exemplifying the importance of the Congregational Church in Ipswich and of churches in general to 19th century Queensland communities.

The place is important in demonstrating the principal characteristics of a particular class of cultural places.

It also has special association with the work of architect and builder Samuel Shenton as a fine example of his work in Ipswich. Shenton was a prominent architect and builder in Ipswich from the 1850s to the 1880s.

The place is important because of its aesthetic significance.

The former manse has aesthetic significance for its high streetscape value due to its scale and traditional materials and detailing.

The place has a special association with the life or work of a particular person, group or organisation of importance in Queensland's history.

The former manse has special association with the past congregations of the Congregational Church of Ipswich and the pastors and their families who once lived there.
