= Brenda Gibbs =

Australian politician

Senator for Queensland
- In office 1 July 1996 – 30 June 2002

Personal details
- Born: Brenda Coombs; 3 September 1947 (age 78) Liverpool, England, United Kingdom
- Party: Labor
- Spouse: Bob Gibbs (m. 1965; div. 1997)
- Occupation: Clerk

Brenda Gibbs (née Coombs; born 3 September 1947) is a former Australian politician. She was a Senator for Queensland from 1996 to 2002, representing the Australian Labor Party (ALP).

== Early life ==
Gibbs was born on 3 September 1947 in Liverpool, England. She was the daughter of Margaret Anne (née Clough) and Norman Coombs.

Gibbs arrived in Australia with her family in 1953, settling in Brisbane; she did not become an Australian citizen until 1984. They initially lived in a migrant camp in Moorooka and in state housing in Inala, before moving into their own house in Moorooka in 1960. Gibbs attended Windsor State School, Moorooka State School and Salisbury State High School. She left high school after two years.

Before entering parliament, Gibbs worked in various administrative and clerical roles, including with the Griffith University Union of Students, the Australian Journalists Association, and the Australasian Meat Industry Employees Union. In 1996 she completed an associate diploma in business and industrial relations at the Queensland University of Technology.

== Politics ==
Gibbs joined the Australian Labor Party (ALP) in 1969. She was a delegate to state council from 1985 and was also a delegate to state conference in 1987 and national conference in 1991. She served on the state administrative committee from 1994 to 1997.

Gibbs was elected to a six-year Senate term at the 1996 federal election. Her preselection was controversial, in part due to her husband's position as ALP state president, and occurred only after an existing candidate resigned from the ticket. Her support derived from "an unlikely alliance between her own faction, Labor Left, and the right-wing Labor Unity faction".

Gibbs' son died from a heroin overdose a week after her election to parliament. She was an advocate for drug law reform, supporting a medical approach to drug addiction including the introduction of supervised injection sites and increased government funding for treatment facilities. She also spoke frequently on poverty in Australia and welfare matters.

In June 2000, Gibbs was demoted to the third position on the ALP's Senate ticket in Queensland, widely regarded as "unwinnable". Her demotion resulted from factional conflict within the party. She was not re-elected at the 2001 election and her term concluded on 30 June 2002.

== Personal life ==
In 1965, aged 17, Gibbs married Bob Gibbs, with whom she had two children. Her husband was a union organiser and was elected to the Queensland Legislative Assembly in 1977, later serving as the party's state president. They divorced in 1997.

After leaving parliament, Gibbs worked for the Logan City Council and as a real estate agent.

She has now retired.
