= Eastern Heights, Queensland =

Eastern Heights Ipswich, Queensland
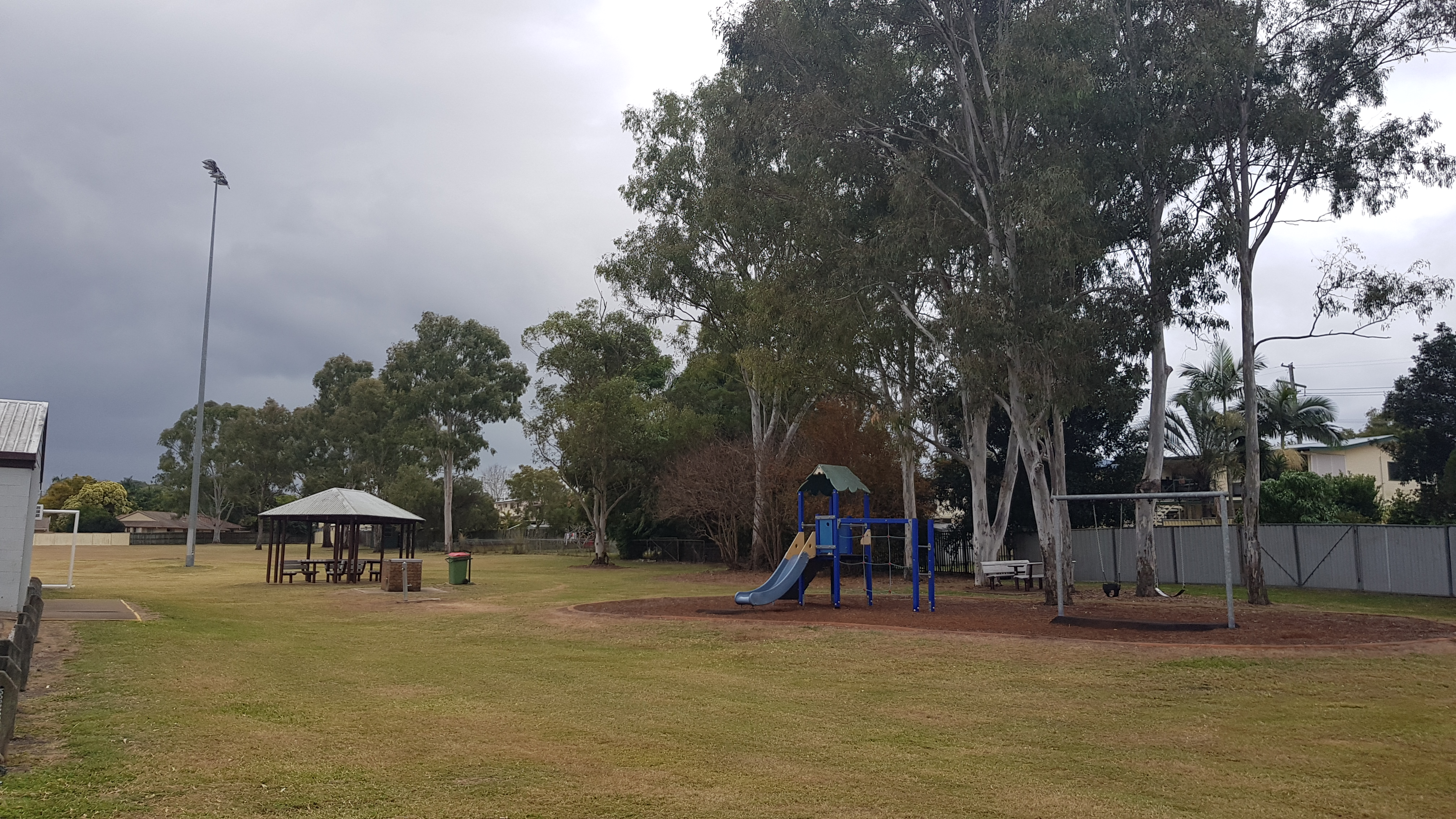
- Jim Donald Park, 2023

- Coordinates: 27.6261°S 152.7744°E
- Population: 3,631 (2021 census)
  - Density: 2,140/km^{2} (5,530/sq mi)
- Postcode(s): 4305
- Area: 1.7 km^{2} (0.7 sq mi)
- Time zone: AEST (UTC+10:00)
- Location: 2.3 km (1 mi) SE of Ipswich CBD; 42.6 km (26 mi) SW of Brisbane CBD
- LGA(s): City of Ipswich
- State electorate(s): Ipswich
- Federal division(s): Blair
Suburbs around Eastern Heights:
Ipswich	Newtown	Silkstone
Ipswich	Eastern Heights	Silkstone
Ipswich	Raceview	Raceview

Eastern Heights is a suburb of Ipswich in the City of Ipswich, Queensland, Australia. In the 2021 census, Eastern Heights had a population of 3,631 people.

== Geography ==
Eastern Heights is bordered to the west by Queens Park and Limestone Park.

== History ==
The origin of the suburb name is from a high ridge on the eastern side of the Ipswich CBD.

To serve the growing settlement, the Newtown State School opened in 1882. In 1915 the old school buildings were put up for sale. One section found its way to Redbank Plains State School while the other became the property of W. Pysden a boot repairer in East Street, Ipswich. Many buildings in the Ipswich area have a similar history of migration.

The Catholic Church of our Lady of the Miraculous Medal was opened in 1962 by Coadjutor Bishop Patrick O'Donnell in the presence of the ailing Archbishop James Duhig.

St Peter's Anglican Church was dedicated on 25 September 1977 by Archbishop Felix Arnott. Its closure circa 2 May 2009 was approved by Archbishop Phillip Aspinall. It was at 28 Lloyd George Street (27.6286°S 152.7738°E).

== Demographics ==
In the 2016 census, Eastern Heights had a population of 3,709 people.

In the 2021 census, Eastern Heights had a population of 3,631 people.

== Heritage listings ==
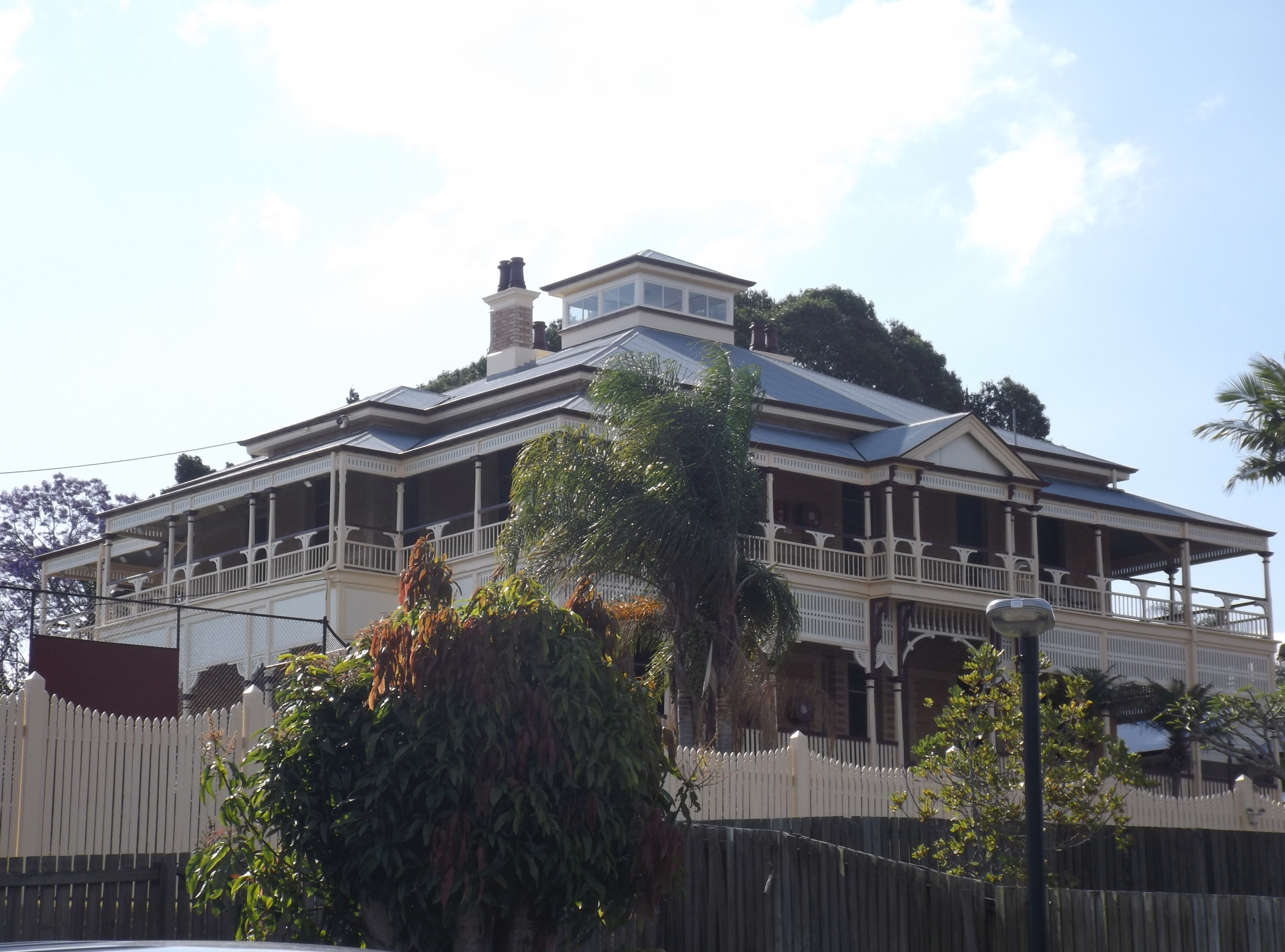
Fairy Knoll residence, 2015

Eastern Heights has a number of heritage-listed sites, including:

- 2A Robertson Road: Fairy Knoll
- 59 Whitehill Road: Garowie

== Transport ==
Eastern Heights is serviced by a regular bus service.

== Education ==
There are no schools in Eastern Heights. The nearest government primary schools are Ipswich Central State School in neighbouring Ipswich CBD to the north-west, Silkstone State School in neighbouring Silkstone to the north-east, and Raceview State School in neighbouring Raceview to the south. The nearest government secondary school is Bremer State High School in neighbouring Ipswich CBD to the south-west.

== Amenities ==
Our Lady of the Miraculous Medal Catholic Church (OLMM) is at 33A Robertson Road (27.6281°S 152.7744°E).

- Jim Donald Memorial Park (soccer)
- Hancock Park
- Scout Hall
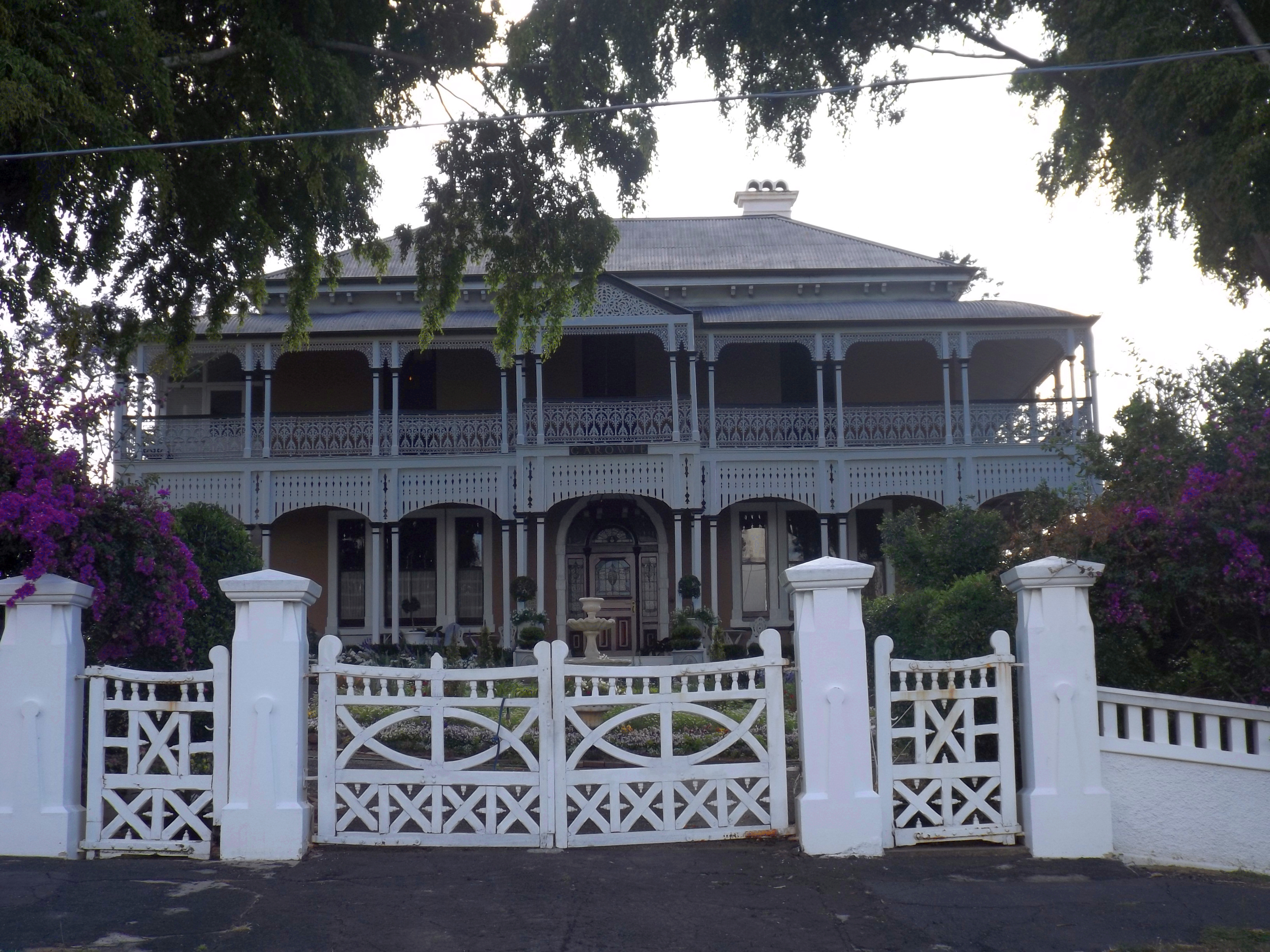
  Garowie 20/04/2015
