= Uniting Church Central Memorial Hall =

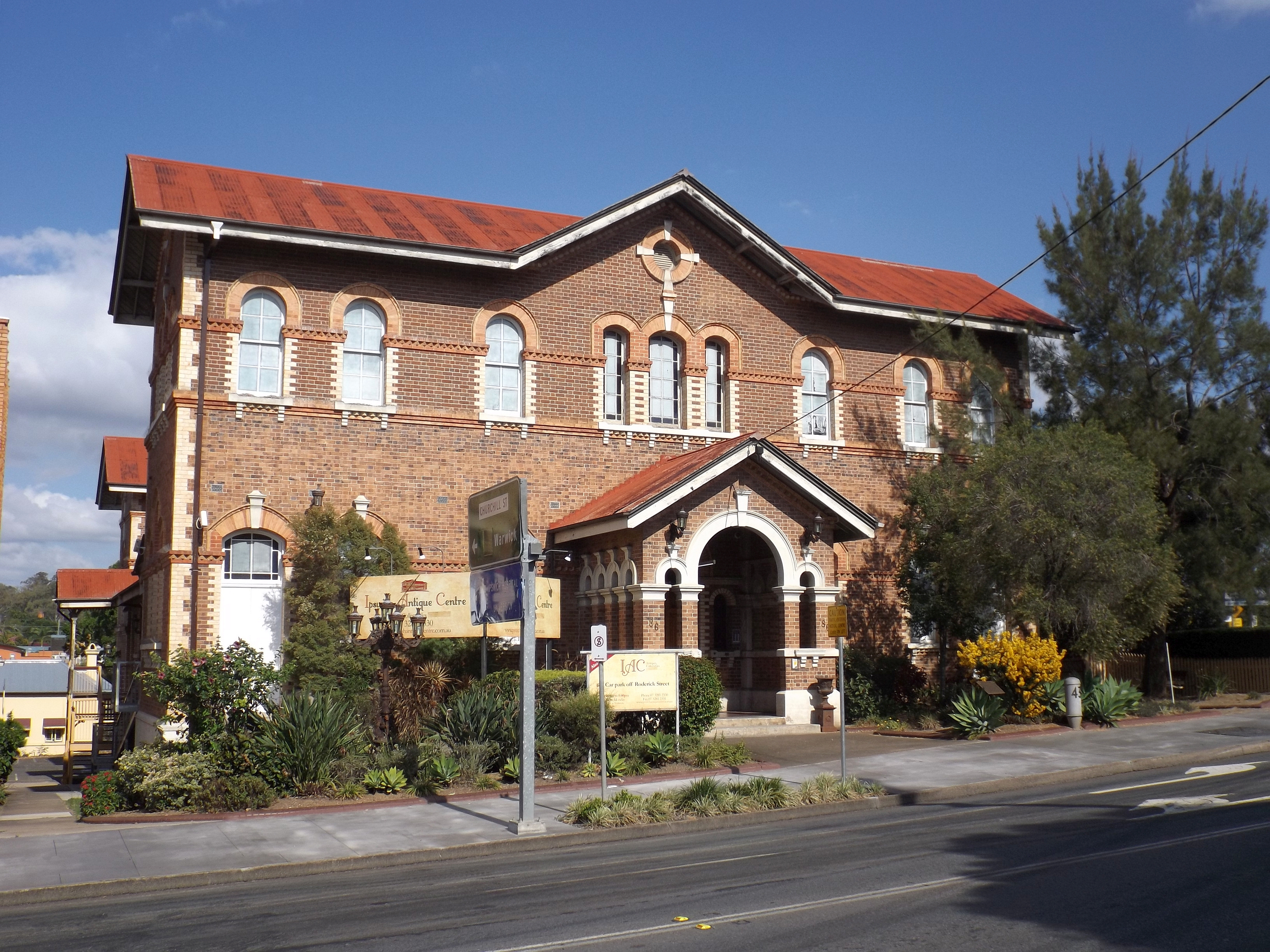
- Building in 2015

- Location within Queensland Location within Australia
- 27.6181°S 152.7603°E
- Location: 86 East Street, Ipswich, City of Ipswich, Queensland, Australia

History
- Design period: 1870s–1890s (late 19th century)
- Built: 1895–1895

Site notes
- Architect: George Brockwell Gill

Queensland Heritage Register
- Official name: Uniting Church Central Memorial Hall, Congregational Sunday School
- Type: state heritage (built)
- Designated: 9 July 1993
- Reference no.: 600576
- Significant period: 1895 (fabric)
- Significant components: library – collection, stained glass window/s, memorial – honour board/ roll of honour, stage/sound shell, office/s, classroom/classroom block/teaching area
- Builders: W Betts

Uniting Church Central Memorial Hall is a heritage-listed church hall at 86 East Street, Ipswich, City of Ipswich, Queensland, Australia. It was designed by George Brockwell Gill and built from 1895 to 1895 by W Betts. It is also known as Congregational Sunday School. It was added to the Queensland Heritage Register on 9 July 1993.

== History ==
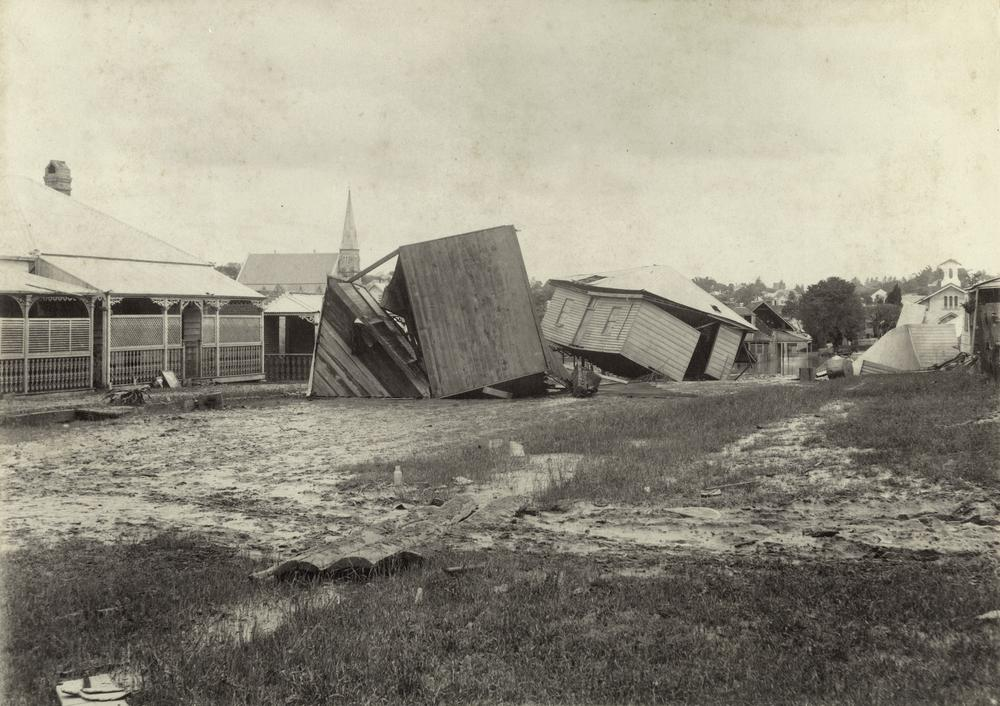
Wreckage caused by floods at the Congregational Church, Ipswich, 1893

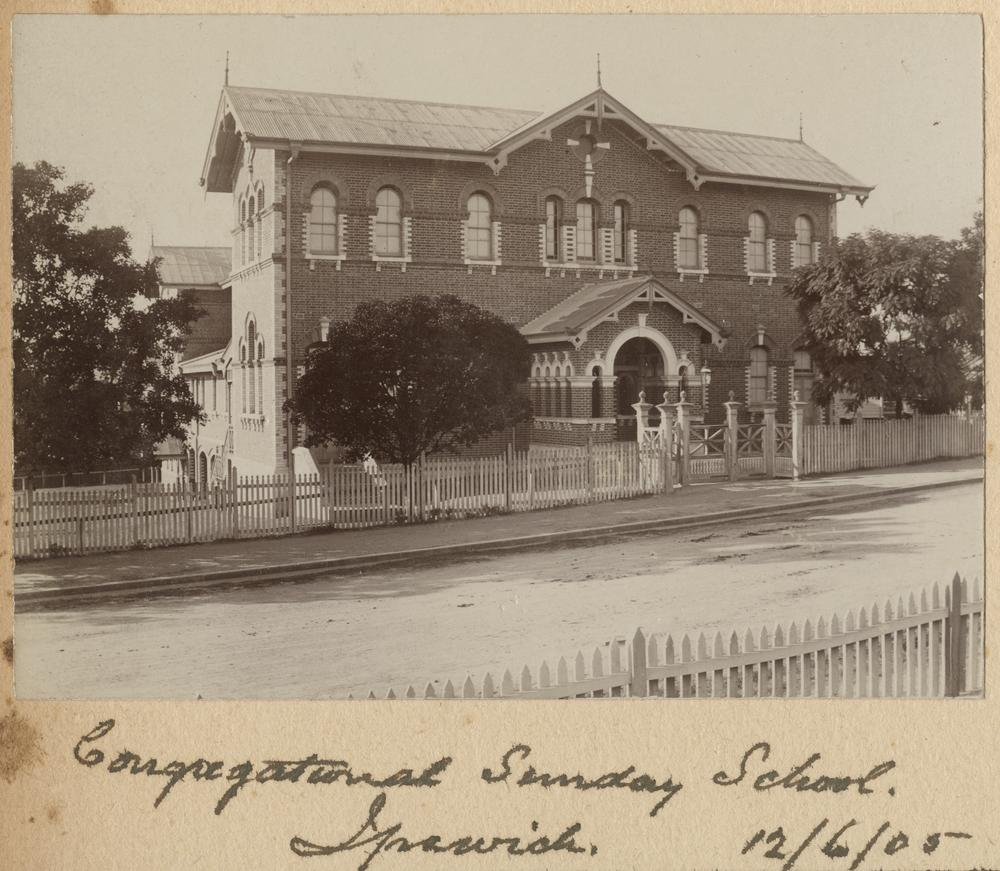
Congregational Sunday School, Ipswich, June 1905

The Uniting Church Central Memorial Hall is a two storeyed brick building erected in 1895 to the design of architect George Brockwell Gill as a Sunday school for the Congregational Church. The Ipswich Congregational Church was formed in 1854 with Reverend Edward Griffith as its first pastor. A year later, the first church was erected on a site in Brisbane Street. This was replaced in 1870, with the earlier building becoming the Sunday school. After the 1893 flood destroyed the Sunday school, a new site was sought. In 1894, the East Street site was purchased by the Church.

The site, opposite the court house and police station had previously been granted to the Ipswich Town Council as a site for the erection of the Town Hall, however this did not proceed and in 1893 was proclaimed a town lot. Plans for the new Sunday school were ambitious; however the work of the Sunday school was considered important, given the secular nature of the state's education system and their enrolment substantial. In 1895, the Congregational Sunday School had 429 scholars and fifty-one teachers under the superintendence of James Clarke Cribb.

George Brockwell Gill's plans provided for a number of classrooms accommodating both children and adults. They were located in the wings of the hall, on the raised platform, and on the front second storey. An infants room and large storeroom were located under the platform at ground level. Opening off the entrance was a library and a room known as the Endeavour Room. The new school cost £3,000. The contractor was W Betts and the brickwork was undertaken by John Mackenzie.

In 1938, the Church acquired the adjoining residence Keiraville previously owned by the Cribb family who were prominent members of the church. After this, Keiraville became the manse. In 1957, a new brick church was erected to the north of the hall. This was known as the Central Memorial Church in memory of those who served in the two World Wars. In 1978, the property was transferred to the Uniting Church. In recent years, the church and Sunday school were closed. The hall is now regularly used by various community groups. The lower former infants classrooms is used as a kindergarten.

== Description ==
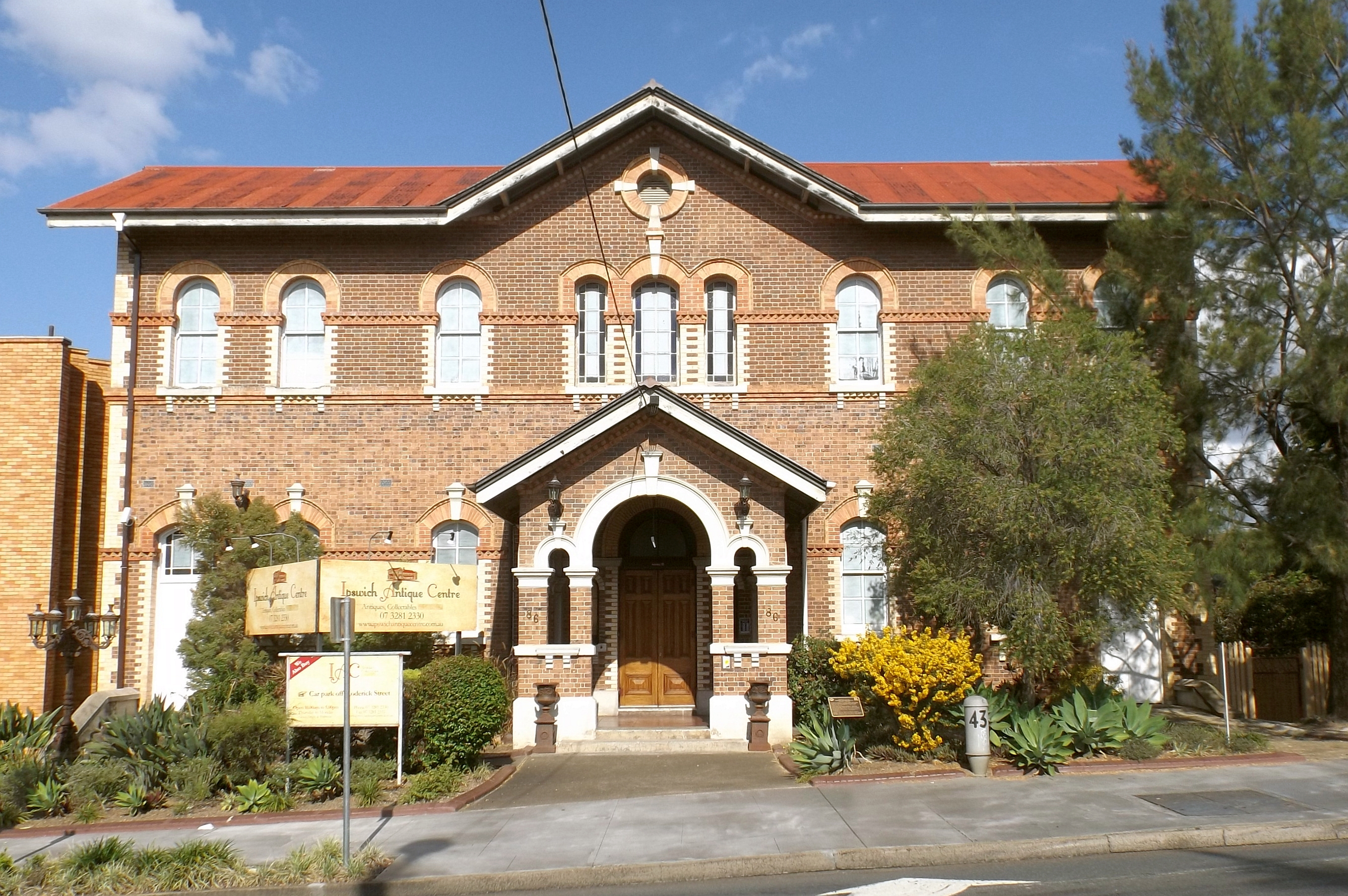
Front of building, 2015

The Memorial Hall is a substantial polychromatic brick building with a corrugated iron roof. It has a two-storeyed wing with a gabled roof fronting onto East St, and a two-storey height hall with a gabled roof extending out to the east: the site slopes away and another storey is included at the rear. The East St elevation has a central entry portico, and a decorative gable breaks the roofline above. The eastern end of the building finishes by expressing the hall roof in a gable end, which is flanked by gables projecting to the north and south; this elevation also has a central timber portico. The north and south walls have skillion roofs under clerestory windows, and timber stairs and entrance porticos. The Memorial Hall is a distinctive member of a small grouping of public buildings on East St, which include the Police Station (1930s) and Old Ipswich Courthouse (1859 and 1880).

The exterior is finely detailed, with rich variations in materials and openings. The base of the building has broad arches, while the upper level openings have hemispherical and flat arches. The gable peaks have circular vents. Surrounds include combinations of beige brick voussoirs and toothing, and terracotta voussoirs, hood mouldings, red brick surrounds, and toothed concrete sills and keystones. The main entrance portico to the west has series of concrete arches with keystones on brick columns under a gabled roof. Other external decoration includes beige brick quoins, and several string courses, made up of combinations of diagonally-placed bricks and projecting bricks, with a concrete string course at hall floor level. The building has in total five timber entrance porticos with fine timber detailing including battens and, cross-braced balustrades. The roof is crowned with a timber and corrugated iron fleche with four gables with finials, which when erected contained a Boyles patent ventilator.

Internally, the hall is encircled by rooms. The western end has a large meeting room, library and office either side of an entrance hall, and a timber mezzanine with balcony access to meeting rooms. To the north and south the hall is flanked by aisles, offices and storage areas. The south aisle has been converted to a kitchen. The eastern end of the hall has a stage and backstage area, and rooms under the eastern end are currently used for childcare.

The hall is an impressive two-storey height space with exposed timber trusses, clerestory lighting, a hardwood floor, and rendered masonry walls. The ceiling has exposed rafters and diagonal timber boards. The aisles are arcaded with arches springing from substantial square columns with square capitals and barley twists in the centre. Doorways to ancillary rooms are also arched. The aisles have raked timber boarded ceilings with exposed rafters. The mezzanine sits behind three arches springing from pilasters in the western wall, and has a wrought iron balustrade. The stage has timber partitions to rear, and behind the stage area is a gable wall with a three-light stained glass window. The clerestory windows have multi-coloured panes around their edges.

The principal entrance to the building to the west has arched doors with arched stained glass sidelights, leading to an entry vestibule; similar doors and sidelights lead to the hall. The entrance vestibule is a double storey height volume with timber stairs climbing around its perimeter. The stairs have finely turned and carved balustrades, striped timbers to the soffits, and meet an arched window with coloured glass at the half landing. The vestibule also contains a brass and timber honour roll. The adjacent library has extensive timber shelving, and the meeting room opposite has external entrance doors with coloured glass and timber boarded ceilings with a star- shaped ceiling rose. The mezzanine rooms have exposed framing under gable roofs, with diagonally boarded ceilings.

The Memorial Hall is a very fine and intact building; the interior spaces, particularly the hall and entrance vestibule, have impressive spatial qualities, and contain finely detailed elements. The exterior is distinctive and rich in its use of materials and fine detailing of walls, porticos and openings.

The associated church and the Hall were put on the market in 2009.

== Heritage listing ==
Uniting Church Central Memorial Hall was listed on the Queensland Heritage Register on 9 July 1993 having satisfied the following criteria.

The place is important in demonstrating the evolution or pattern of Queensland's history.

The Uniting Church Central Memorial Hall is important in demonstrating the pattern of Queensland's history, in particular the development of the Congregational Church in Ipswich and the importance placed on education within the Church.

The place demonstrates rare, uncommon or endangered aspects of Queensland's cultural heritage.

It is a rare example of a substantial masonry Sunday School building, and demonstrates the principal characteristics of a substantial Ipswich building by architect George Brockwell Gill.

The place is important in demonstrating the principal characteristics of a particular class of cultural places.

It is a rare example of a substantial masonry Sunday School building, and demonstrates the principal characteristics of a substantial Ipswich building by architect George Brockwell Gill.

The place is important because of its aesthetic significance.

It exhibits a range of aesthetic characteristics valued by the community, including the fine detailing and rich use of materials of the exterior; the contribution to the townscape as a distinctive and substantial decorated brick building amongst a group of public buildings on East St; the impressive spatial quality of the hall and entrance vestibule; the decorative detailing of major internal elements; and the fine craft-work of the stairs and stained glass windows.

The place has a strong or special association with a particular community or cultural group for social, cultural or spiritual reasons.

As the Sunday school and hall for over ninety years, it has a special association with the Congregational (now Uniting Church) community of Ipswich.

The place has a special association with the life or work of a particular person, group or organisation of importance in Queensland's history.

It has a special association with the life and work of a number of people associated with the life of the church, in particular James C Cribb, Joseph Hargreaves, and Alexander Nichol, who served as Superintendents of the Sunday School; and members of the church, who served during the First World War, whose names are recorded on the roll of honour.
