= Bob Gibbs (Australian politician) =

Australian politician

The Hon Bob Gibbs

Member of the Queensland Legislative Assembly for Wolston
- In office 12 November 1977 – 19 September 1992
- Preceded by: Evan Marginson
- Succeeded by: Seat abolished

Member of the Queensland Legislative Assembly for Bundamba
- In office 19 September 1992 – 14 December 1999
- Preceded by: New seat
- Succeeded by: Jo-Ann Miller

Personal details
- Born: Robert James Gibbs; 3 November 1946 (age 79) Brisbane, Queensland, Australia
- Party: Labor
- Spouse: Brenda Gibbs
- Occupation: Boilermaker, Trade union official,

Robert James Gibbs (born 3 November 1946) is an Australian politician. He was a Labor member of the Legislative Assembly of Queensland from 1977 to 1999, representing Wolston until 1992 and Bundamba thereafter.

Born in Brisbane on 3 November 1946, Gibbs was a boilermaker before his election and was an organiser for the Miscellaneous Workers' Union and the Labor Party. He was Assistant State Secretary of the party from 1974 to 1976. Following his election he moved directly to the Labor front bench, serving as spokesman for various portfolios until the party won government in 1989. He was minister for Tourism, Sport and Racing in the Goss Government, moving to Primary Industries and Racing in July 1995. In Opposition he continued in the same portfolio and was made Minister for Tourism, Sport and Racing when Labor returned to government in 1998. Gibbs resigned from the ministry and from parliament in December 1999.

He had a stint as President of the Queensland ALP in 1995.

Gibbs' wife Brenda Gibbs served as a Senator in the Federal Parliament between 1996 and 2002.

Parliament of Queensland
| Preceded by Evan Marginson | Member for Wolston; 1977–1992 | Succeeded by Abolished |
| Preceded by New seat | Member for Bundamba; 1992–1999 | Succeeded by Jo-Ann Miller |
