= James Clarke Cribb =

Australian politician

James Cribb
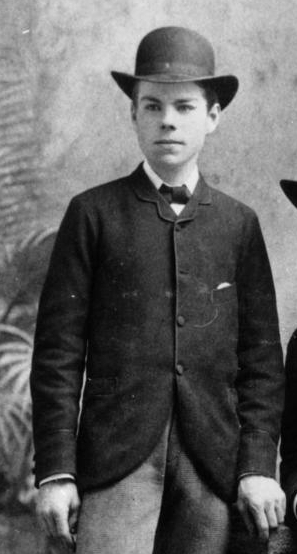

Member of the Queensland Legislative Assembly for Rosewood
- In office 6 May 1893 – 21 March 1896
- Preceded by: James Foote
- Succeeded by: Denis Keogh

Member of the Queensland Legislative Assembly for Bundamba
- In office 18 March 1899 – 27 April 1912
- Preceded by: Lewis Thomas
- Succeeded by: Seat abolished

Member of the Queensland Legislative Assembly for Bremer
- In office 27 April 1912 – 22 May 1915
- Preceded by: New seat
- Succeeded by: Frank Arthur Cooper

Personal details
- Born: James Clarke Cribb; 4 October 1856 Ipswich, Colony of New South Wales
- Died: 23 May 1926 (aged 69) Ipswich, Queensland, Australia
- Resting place: Ipswich General Cemetery
- Party: Ministerialist
- Spouse: Alice Elizabeth Browne
- Relations: Benjamin Cribb (father), John Clarke Foote (uncle), Robert Cribb (uncle), Thomas Bridson Cribb (brother)
- Occupation: Company director

James Clarke Cribb (1856–1926) was a businessman and politician in Queensland, Australia . He was a Member of the Queensland Legislative Assembly.

== Early life ==
James Clarke Cribb was born 4 October 1856 at Ipswich, the son of Benjamin Cribb (a Member of the Queensland Legislative Assembly) and his second wife, Clarissa Foote (the sister of John Clarke Foote). His middle name Clarke was the maiden name of his maternal grandmother, Elizabeth Clarke.

== Business interests ==
He followed into the family business of Cribb & Foote, a major retailer in Ipswich. Cribb was also a member of the board of the Ipswich Hospital, a director of the Ipswich Gas and Coke Company and the Queensland Woollen Mills, and a trustee of the Ipswich Grammar School.

Like his parents, James was an active member of the Ipswich Congregational Church. One of the ambitious projects of the church was the establishment of a Sunday School to educate both adults and children. This required the construction of the large two-storey Congregational Sunday School (now known as the Uniting Church Central Memorial Hall and listed on the Queensland Heritage Register). James Clarke Cribb was appointed superintendent of the Sunday School and by 1895 had 429 scholars and fifty-one teachers under his supervision.

== Politics ==
James Cribb served the family company until 1904, when he was elected to the Bundamba Shire Council, serving a total of 19 years as a state parliamentarian. Cribb was also a member of the board of the Ipswich Hospital, a director of the Ipswich Gas and Coke Company and the Queensland Woollen Mills, a trustee of the Ipswich and superintendent of the Congregational Sunday School.

On 6 May 1893, James Clarke Cribb was elected to the Queensland Legislative Assembly in the electoral district of Rosewood; he held that seat until 21 March 1896.

On 18 March 1899, he was elected in the electoral district of Bundamba. He held that seat until 27 April 1912, when it became the electoral district of Bremer. On 27 April 1912, he was elected in the electoral district of Bremer; he held that seat until 22 May 1915. He served for a total of 19 years in the Queensland parliament.

== Later life ==
James Clarke Cribb died on 23 May 1926 at Ipswich and was buried in the Ipswich General Cemetery.

Parliament of Queensland
| Preceded by James Foote | Member for Rosewood; 1893–1896 | Succeeded by Denis Keogh |
| Preceded by Lewis Thomas | Member for Bundamba; 1899–1912 | Abolished |
| New seat | Member for Bremer; 1912–1915 | Succeeded by Frank Cooper |
