= Electoral district of Wolston =

Former state electoral district in Queensland, Australia

Wolston Queensland—Legislative Assembly
- State: Queensland
- Dates current: 1972–1992

Wolston was an electoral district of the Legislative Assembly in the Australian state of Queensland from 1972 to 1992.

First created for the 1972 state election, the district was based in the eastern part of Ipswich, essentially replacing the abolished district of Ipswich East. Wolston was a safe seat for the Labor Party.

Wolston was abolished by the 1991 redistribution; the first redistribution undertaken to comply with the one vote one value reforms. Its territory was largely divided between the new electorates of Bundamba and Inala with parts also added to the new district of Mount Ommaney.

== Members for Wolston ==
Member	Party	Term
Evan Marginson	Labor	1972–1977
Bob Gibbs	Labor	1977–1992

== See also ==
- Electoral districts of Queensland
- Members of the Queensland Legislative Assembly by year
- Category:Members of the Queensland Legislative Assembly by name
