= Fairy Knoll =

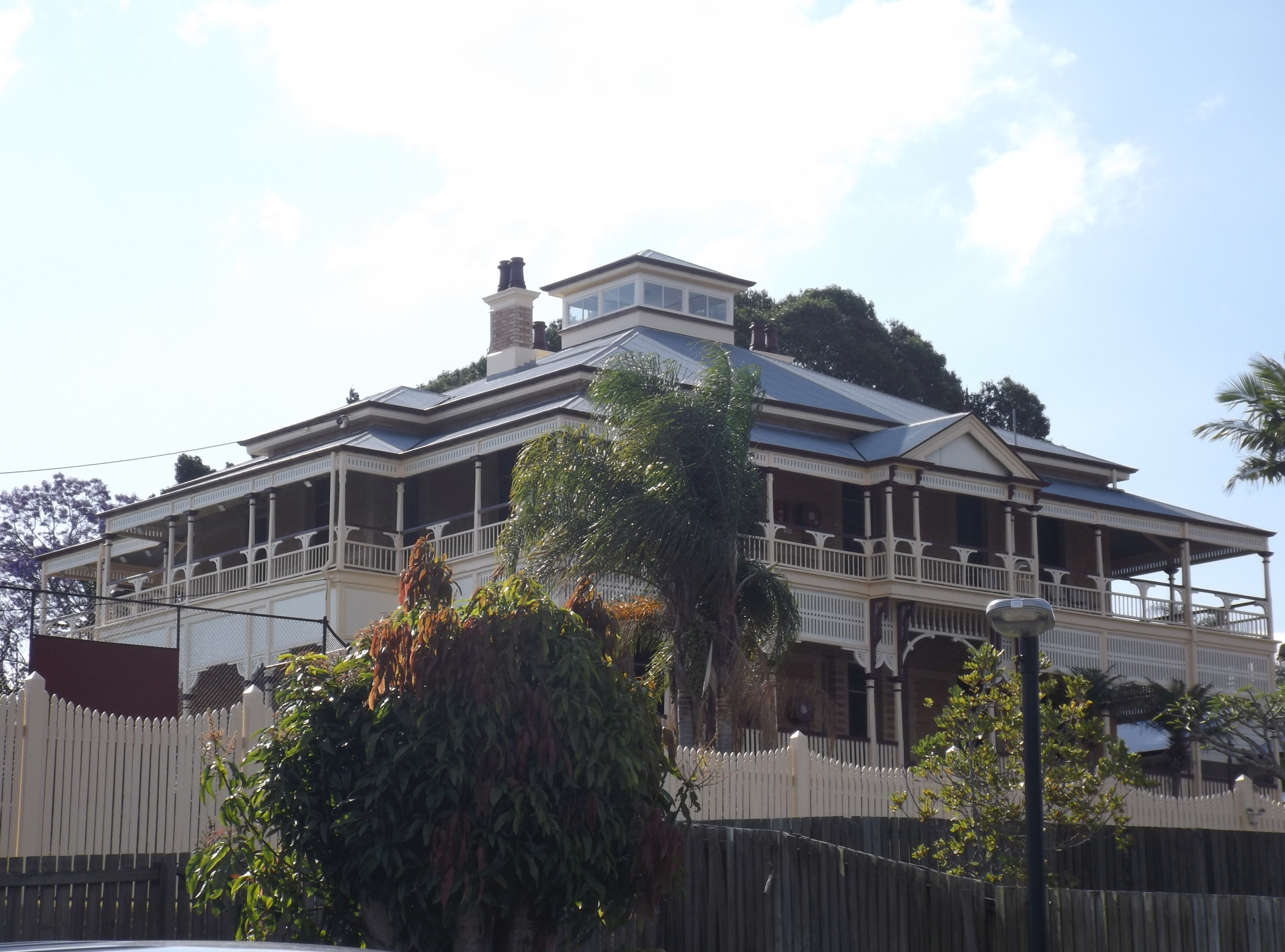
- Residence in 2015

- Location within Queensland Location within Australia
- 27.6268°S 152.7702°E
- Location: 2A Robertson Road, Eastern Heights, City of Ipswich, Queensland, Australia

History
- Design period: 1870s – 1890s (late 19th century)
- Built: c. 1897 – 1952

Site notes
- Architect: George Brockwell Gill

Queensland Heritage Register
- Official name: Fairy Knoll, Jefferis Turner Centre (former)
- Type: state heritage (built, landscape)
- Designated: 21 October 1992
- Reference no.: 600600
- Significant period: 1890s–1900s, 1950s (fabric); 1890s–1940s, 1950s (historical); 1952–1986 (social)
- Significant components: trees/plantings, garden edging/balustrades/planter boxes, roof lantern / lantern light, residential accommodation – main house, lawn/s, driveway, stained glass window/s, views to, garden/grounds, steps/stairway, garden – bed/s, tennis court site, wall/s – retaining, views from
- Builders: Worley & Whitehead

Fairy Knoll is a heritage-listed villa at 2A Robertson Road, Eastern Heights, City of Ipswich, Queensland, Australia. It was designed by George Brockwell Gill and built from c. 1897 to 1952 by Worley & Whitehead. It was also known as Jefferis Turner Centre. It was added to the Queensland Heritage Register on 21 October 1992.

== History ==
The grand two storey brick residence, Fairy Knoll, was completed in 1901 by contractors Worley and Whitehead to the 1896 design of architect George Brockwell Gill. The residence was built for Thomas Hancock (Junior), a successful timber merchant, his wife Louisa Hayne and their ten children.

Thomas Hancock came to Ipswich in 1863 with his parents and brothers and sister. His father Thomas Hancock (Senior) commenced sawing timber at Pine Mountain and later acquired a sawmill in Rosewood. In 1875, he acquired the lease over the North Ipswich timber mill and in October 1880 Thomas Hancock & Sons opened a new mill in Lowry Street, North Ipswich. By 1885 Thomas Hancock & Sons was a successful expanding company employing 138 hands in Ipswich as well as many in their Brisbane offices totalling 274 people. The Ipswich complex included a mill, joinery and moulding plant and a lathe department which produced doors, window sashes and panelling.

Thomas Hancock Senior died in 1891 and the company passed into the hands of his sons Josias and Thomas Junior. Thomas Hancock Junior had married his second wife Louisa Hayne in 1878 and by 1885 they had two sons Thomas and Norman and a daughter Eva and were expecting another daughter, Florence. Thomas Hancock subsequently bought four acres on the crest of the hill above Chermside Road (then Boundary Road) from Ambrose John Foote with the intention of building a family home.

The first house Hancock built on the site was a simple timber home. By 1897 Thomas and Louisa Hancock had five boys and five girls and Thomas dreamed of erecting a two storey brick mansion to replace the wooden house. In 1896 he transferred the title to his wife Louisa and the following year is believed to have commissioned architect George Brockwell Gill to design the new home. Thomas Hancock did not live to see Fairy Knoll completed as he died in 1897. The house was constructed at a cost of £2000 and in 1901 Louisa Hancock and her ten children moved into their new home and Louisa continued to live there until 1947.

The architect, George Brockwell Gill, designed many of the grand residences and public buildings in Ipswich from the 1880s to the 1930s. Some of his works include Brynhyfryd for Lewis Thomas (1889–90), St Paul's Rectory (1895), the Ipswich Club House (1916), the Ipswich Technical College (1901), and supervision of the construction of the Walter Burley Griffin Incinerator in 1936. Gill emigrated from London and settled in Ipswich in 1886 where he commenced work as an architect for the firm of Samuel Shenton. Gill took over Shenton's practice in 1889 when Shenton retired. Gill had been elected Associate of the Queensland Institute of Architects in 1904 and Fellow by 1913. He was its Vice-President in 1914–16 and President in 1918–19. Gill was also a member of the Board of Trustees for Ipswich Girls' Grammar School and on his retirement in 1948 he was the Chairman of the Board of Trustees.

The newly finished house was described in The Queensland Times in March 1901 which mentioned such features as the 10-foot (3.0 m) wide front entrance hall with a solid cedar entrance door and side stained glass windows. An arched opening at the end of the hall led to a walnut staircase in the centre of the building. The staircase was three flights from floor to floor. It was lit by well-distributed light from the lantern in the apex of the roof. The water was supplied by two large, built in brick cisterns, immediately under the roof and lined with iron, which had a capacity of 4,000 imperial gallons (18,000 L; 4,800 US gal). The water supply was drawn by gravity.

The gardens were a feature of Fairy Knoll and during the Hancocks' residence there included a gravel drive with the main entrance gates on Robertson Road. The drive was fringed with a Duaranta spp. hedge which made a circus ring in which the Hancock children played with their pony. The grounds also comprised fine lawns and beds and towards Robertson Road there was a circular pond. Today it is a flower garden now known as the Bull's Ring. It is a said that the mature poinciana trees and Moreton Bay fig trees were planted in the days of the first family home and they still stand on the western side of the extension. The grounds also contained a fernery, bush house, and fowl pens. A laundry, store room, earth closet and garage in one large complex stood next to the fowl pens on the northern side of the house. This structure was constructed of weatherboard and chamferboard and had a stone rear wall. The stone wall is still extant.

The Hancock family occupied the house for forty-six years and enjoyed a high standard of living for which the house was designed. The rooms were large and the bedrooms were designed to accommodate one or two persons as opposed to poorer households where the average was three and up to five persons per room. The rooms were furnished with solid oak and cedar furniture. The dining room contained a large table, capable of seating twenty persons, and a sideboard. The Hancocks employed two maids, a laundress and a gardener but none of these staff lived in the house.

During World War II the family were active with the war effort and the light well at Fairy Knoll was used as a spotter's tower as it provided an expansive view of Ipswich and the surrounding areas. After the war had ended much of the Hancock family land around Eastern Heights was subdivided and given to the Anglican, Catholic and Presbyterian Churches and the Scouts.

Louisa Hancock died on 22 April 1947 aged 92. After the death of Louisa Hancock, Fairy Knoll was transformed into a maternal and child welfare home.

The Jefferis Turner Centre was opened in 1952 as part of the Queensland Labor Government's Maternal and Child Welfare program in the 1940s and 1950s. The Maternity Act of 1922 brought about changes in health care in Queensland elevating the importance of maternal and infant welfare to an unprecedented level. In the 1940s and 1950s the program concentrated on developing Mothercraft Homes which provided residential care for mothers and babies as well as training for staff in infant health.

Many alterations were undertaken in the conversion of Fairy Knoll to the Jefferis Turner Centre. Major external changes included the removal of the 4,000 imperial gallons (18,000 L; 4,800 US gal) water tank from the roof, the enclosure of the verandahs on the southern and western sides, the asbestos cement sheet cladding of the verandah valance and the construction of an extension on the northern side and new out buildings as well as a fire escape from the upper level of the original house. The house was substantially changed internally, the details of which can be found in the Conservation Plan for Jefferis Turner Centre by Margaret Cook and Paul Burmester (February 2001).

The Jefferis Turner Centre was officially opened on 3 August 1952 by the minister for Health and Home Affairs. The centre could accommodate four or five mothers and about ten babies and at the time of opening the home employed three nursing sisters and six trainees. By September 1952 there were six trained nurses living in, five mothers and ten infants.

The building continued as the Jefferis Turner Centre until 1986 when the Department of Health decided to close it and convert it to a centre offering care to intellectually handicapped children. The Jefferis Turner Centre was transferred to the Intellectual Handicap Service in October 1986, its new role being to provide short term respite care for intellectually disabled children while their families had a holiday or when there was a family emergency. Improvements to the appearance of the building were undertaken in 1988 by the Department of Public Works. Enclosed rooms were removed and the verandahs were opened up to their original form. In 2011 the building was again in use as a family home.

== Description ==
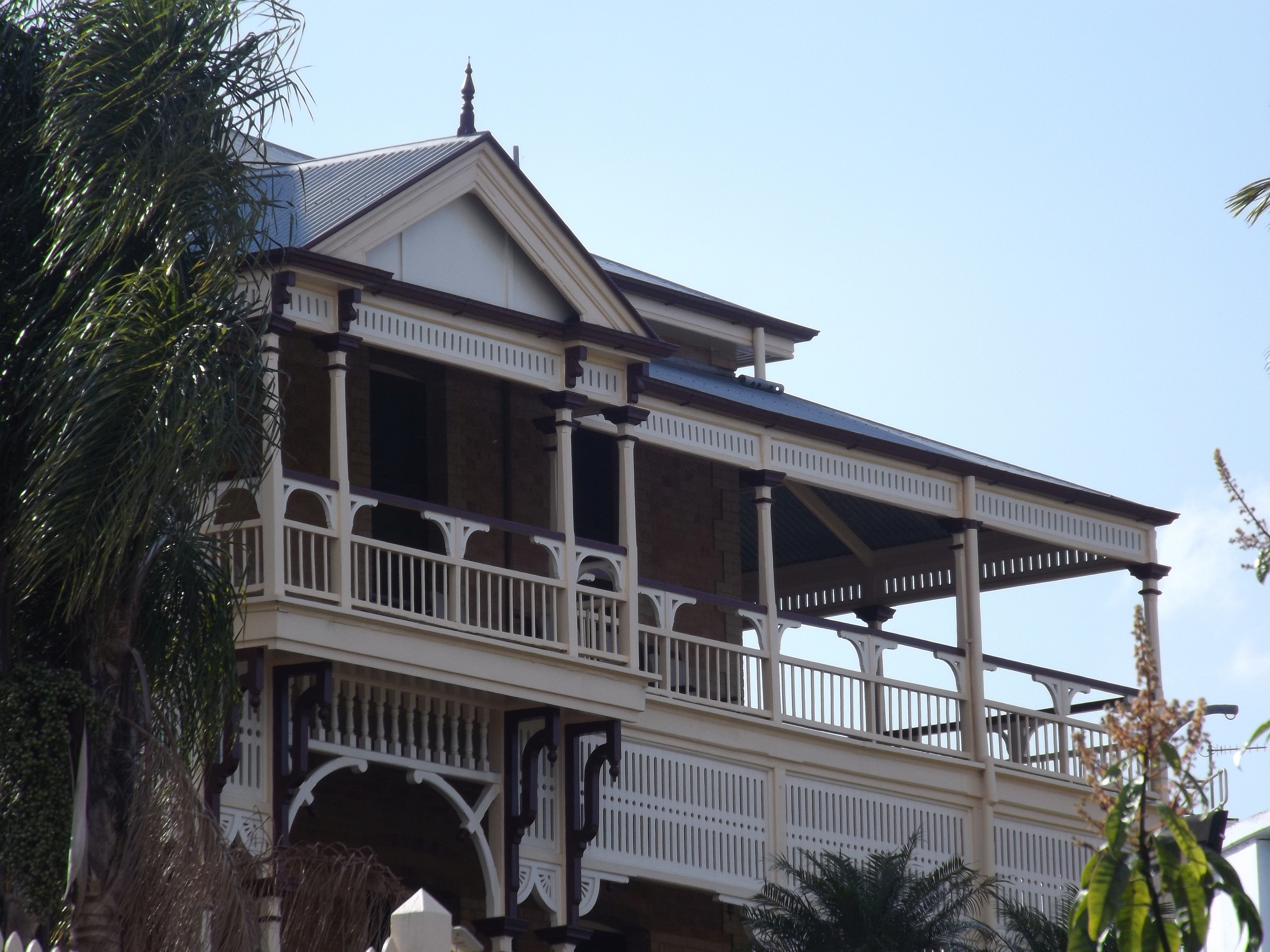
Verandah, 2015

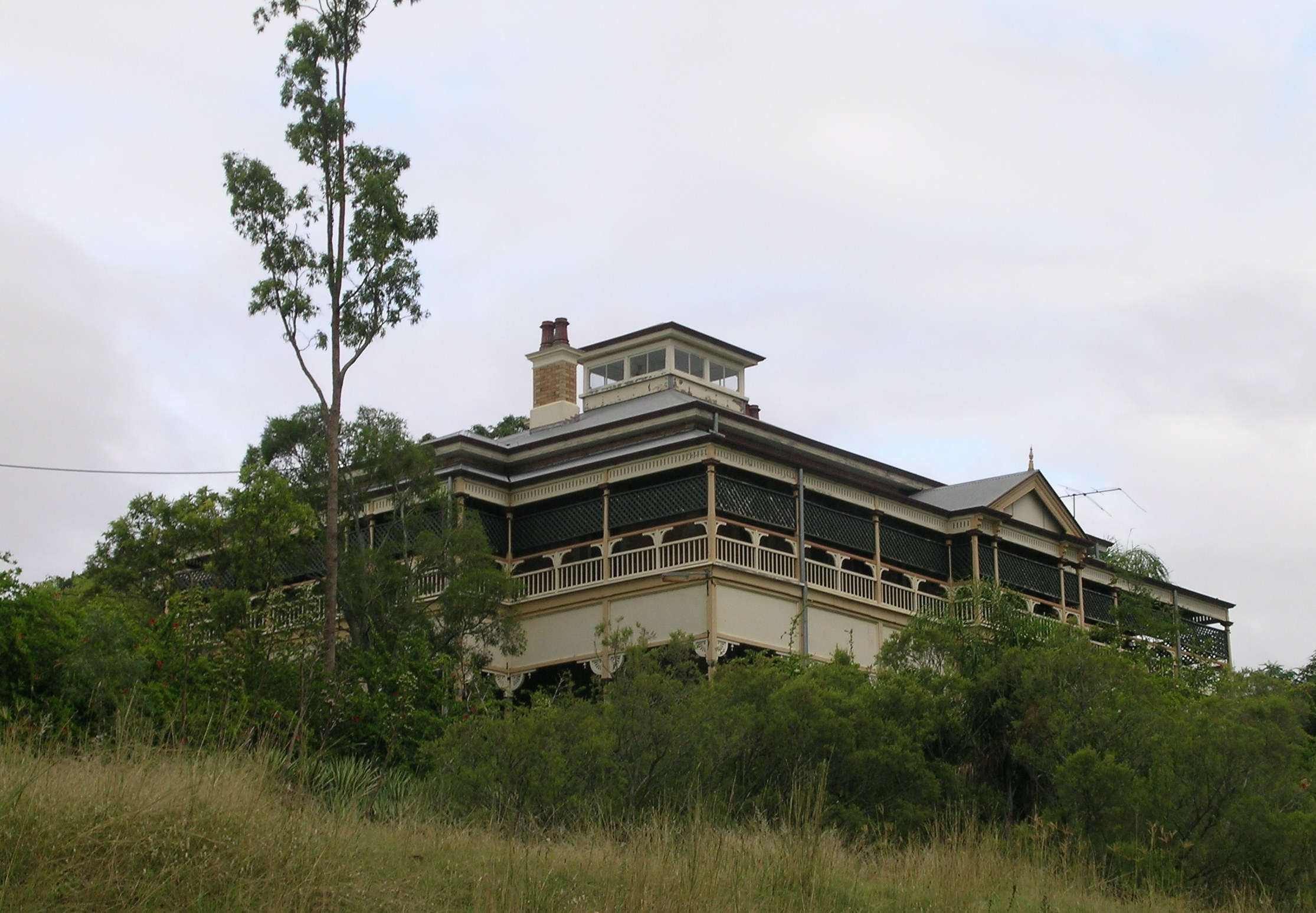
Residence in 2009

Fairy Knoll is a grand and imposing, two-storey, easterly-facing residence, on an elevated area bounded by Chermside, Robertson and Whitehill roads. It has expansive views from its surrounding verandahs, and it overlooks the south-eastern area of Queens Park. It has a brick core which is wrapped by decorative timber verandahs, the detailing of which creates patterns of light and dark, and is typical of Queensland Federation era architecture. The structure has a corrugated iron, pyramid roof, with a lantern at its apex. The lantern lights the home's central stairwell. The upper level verandah has separate corrugated iron roofing. At this level, a gable and pediment, with finial, define the main entry.

The polychromatic brickwork was described in The Queensland Times in 1901 as "dark-coloured buff facing brick, relieved at the angle quoins and quoins of window and door openings with light-coloured bricks. The arches are finished with a dark brick, tuck-pointed, and the strings with bricks similar to the quoins.". There is a ground floor extension to the rear of the house.

The house is situated on substantial grounds which still displays some of the original features and the subsequent changes over the past century. A set of concrete stairs extending from the southern verandah of the house leads to an open level lawn. The driveway accesses Robertson Street and is flanked by mature Mango trees planted in the 1950s. This driveway is the only portion of the original driveway which has survived. There is a set of concrete and brick stairs providing access from the driveway to the main entrance of the house. The large trees to the north-west corner of the house date from the early 1900s as well as the large palm trees to the east, adjacent to the main entry of the house. There are garden beds lining the east, west and south brick bases of the house, edged with matching brick which also date from the 1900s. There remains of a stone wall to the Robertson Road boundary. Remains of the former tennis court area are evident on the open level area cut into the bank beside the entry off Robertson Road. A rose garden now occupies the area.

== Heritage listing ==
Fairy Knoll was listed on the Queensland Heritage Register on 21 October 1992 having satisfied the following criteria.

The place is important in demonstrating the evolution or pattern of Queensland's history.

The erection of Fairy Knoll in 1901 exemplified the pattern of affluent settlement in Ipswich around the turn of the 20th century. The culmination of the 19th century saw much renewed building activity in Ipswich as a result of local commerce becoming established and was reflected in the establishment of grand residences by successful families in business. Many of these grand homes were established on the hilltop area east of Queens Park, where Fairy Knoll still stands today.

The place is important in demonstrating the principal characteristics of a particular class of cultural places.

Designed in 1897, Fairy Knoll is a significant example of a late 1890s grand residence specifically suited to the requirements of a large, wealthy family. It demonstrates early design practices in relation to room function, layout, responses to climate, building materials and workmanship despite its later adaptation for other uses.

Fairy Knoll has strong association with the work of prominent Ipswich architect George Brockwell Gill as a good example of his work.

The place is important because of its aesthetic significance.

Fairy Knoll possesses strong aesthetic value due to its prominence as a landmark in Ipswich which has dominant visual impact on the surrounding area and for its fine detailing and composition. The residence is characteristic of the Federation Filigree style of architecture which is demonstrated by its intricate timber screen, its slender columns of timber dividing the facade into bays, a timber frieze and brackets and timber railings. Its decorative external brickwork also contributes to its aesthetic value. Its setting on a large piece of land with gardens and mature trees is also of important aesthetic significance.

The place has a strong or special association with a particular community or cultural group for social, cultural or spiritual reasons.

Fairy Knoll has strong association with the community of Ipswich as a local landmark creating a strong sense of place in the city, particularly in the surrounding streets.

The place has a special association with the life or work of a particular person, group or organisation of importance in Queensland's history.

The building is also historically important as the premises of the fifth mothercraft home established by the Queensland Government. It opened as The Jefferis Turner Centre in 1952 named after the first Director of Maternal and Child Welfare in Queensland, Dr Alfred Jefferis Turner. The Jefferis Turner Centre was part of an ongoing programme of maternal and child welfare instigated by the Theodore government in 1922.

It also has strong association with the Hancock family who built and lived in the home for 46 years. The Hancocks made a substantial contribution to the Queensland timber industry from the 1860s and were recognised as a well-known group of benefactors.
