= Electoral district of Ipswich East =

Ipswich East Queensland—Legislative Assembly
- State: Queensland
- Created: 1960
- Abolished: 1972
- Namesake: Ipswich, Queensland
- Demographic: Rural
- Coordinates: 27°37′S 152°47′E

The electoral district of Ipswich East was a Legislative Assembly electorate in the state of Queensland. It was first created in a redistribution ahead of the 1960 state election, and existed until the 1972 state election.

Ipswich East incorporated much of the former Electoral district of Bremer.

Ipswich East was abolished in 1972, mostly replaced by Wolston.

== Members for Ipswich East ==
The members for Ipswich East were:

| Member | Party | Term |
|---|---|---|
| Jim Donald | Labor | 1960–1969 |
| Evan Marginson | Labor | 1969–1972 |

Marginson went on to represent Wolston from May 1972 to October 1977.

== See also ==
- Electoral districts of Queensland
- Members of the Queensland Legislative Assembly by year
- Category:Members of the Queensland Legislative Assembly by name
