= Jim Donald (politician) =

Australian politician

Leader of the Opposition in Queensland Leader of the Labor Party in Queensland
- In office 14 April 1958 – 18 August 1958
- Deputy: Eric Lloyd
- Preceded by: Les Wood
- Succeeded by: Jack Duggan

Member of the Queensland Legislative Assembly for Ipswich East Bremer (1946–1960)
- In office 25 May 1946 – 17 May 1969
- Preceded by: Frank Arthur Cooper
- Succeeded by: Evan Marginson

Personal details
- Born: James Donald; 1 June 1895 Redbank, Queensland, Australia
- Died: 4 May 1976 (aged 80) Ipswich, Queensland, Australia
- Resting place: Ipswich General Cemetery
- Party: Labor
- Spouse(s): Mary J Dobbie (m.1916 d.1955), Hilda Thomlinson (m.1960 d.1984)
- Occupation: Union organiser, Cabinet maker

James Donald (1 June 1895 – 4 May 1976) was a member of the Queensland Legislative Assembly and briefly the leader of the Queensland branch of the Australian Labor Party and Queensland Opposition Leader.

== Early years ==
Donald was born at Redbank, Queensland, to parents Andrew Donald and his wife Jessie (née Simpson) and was educated at Redbank State School and Ipswich State School. He then began an apprenticeship as a cabinetmaker, attending Ipswich Technical College before entering the mining industry as a winding engine driver. It was this job that led to a long association with Queensland Colliery Employees Union where he started out as a union organizer and was vice president several times in the 1940s.

== Political career ==
When the member for Bremer, former Premier Frank Cooper, retired from politics in March 1946, Donald was chosen by the Labor Party to be their candidate at the by-election which was held on the 25 May 1946. Donald went on to win the seat over the Queensland People's Party candidate, Harold Shapcott, by 5643 votes to 3246.

Donald held Bremer until the seat was abolished prior to the 1960 state election when he moved to the newly created seat of Ipswich East which he went on to hold from 1960 until his retirement from politics in 1969.

Although Donald was in parliament for 23 years, he was never appointed to the ministry, almost certainly due to having refused to support a bill introduced by the Labor Party concerning miners' pensions and entitlements. He was, however, secretary of the State Parliamentary Party for 21 years; and when the leader of the opposition, Les Wood, unexpectedly died in 1958, Donald became the new opposition leader on the 14 April of that year. He stood aside from the position to make way for Jack Duggan on 17 August 1958, after Duggan had won the seat of North Toowoomba in the by-election necessitated by Wood's death.

Donald in effect was interim leader between Wood's death and Duggan's return.

During his political career, Donald earned a reputation as one of the most modest and unassuming gentlemen ever to serve in the Parliament. He had a very quiet manner of debate, which was always well backed up by a great deal of preparation and research. In addition he was an advocate of temperance, on which his views were rigid and uncompromising.

== Personal life ==
Donald married Mary Jane Dobbie on the 27 September 1916 and together had one son and one daughter. Mary died in 1955, and on the 11 July 1960 he married Hilda Bell Julho Thomlinson (died 1984). Donald was interested in cricket, football, tennis and bowls, and was a representative on the Ipswich Cricket and Rugby League associations.

Donald died in May 1976 and was cremated. His ashes are in the Columbarium at Ipswich General Cemetery.

Political offices
Preceded by Les Wood	Leader of the Opposition of Queensland; 1958	Succeeded by Jack Duggan
Parliament of Queensland
Preceded by Frank Cooper	Member for Bremer; 1946–1960	Abolished
New seat	Member for Ipswich East; 1960–1969	Succeeded by Evan Marginson
