= Evan Marginson =

Australian politician

Member of the Queensland Legislative Assembly for Ipswich East
- In office 17 May 1969 – 27 May 1972
- Preceded by: Jim Donald
- Succeeded by: Seat abolished

Member of the Queensland Legislative Assembly for Wolston
- In office 27 May 1972 – 18 October 1977
- Preceded by: New seat
- Succeeded by: Bob Gibbs

Personal details
- Born: 20 March 1909 Chorley, Lancashire, England
- Died: 16 November 1977 (aged 68) Ipswich, Queensland
- Party: Labor
- Occupation: Law clerk

Evan Marginson (20 March 1909 – 16 November 1977) was an Australian politician. He was a Labor member of the Legislative Assembly of Queensland from 1969 to 1977, representing Ipswich East until 1972 and Wolston thereafter.

Marginson was a former goalkeeper for Blackstone Rovers, Booval Stars and Rosebells, before becoming a tennis player and administrator with state Tennis Association.

Parliament of Queensland
Preceded by Jim Donald	Member for Ipswich East; 1969–1972	Abolished
New seat	Member for Wolston; 1972–1977	Succeeded by Bob Gibbs
