= Frank Arthur Cooper =

Australian politician (1872–1949)

The Honourable Frank Cooper
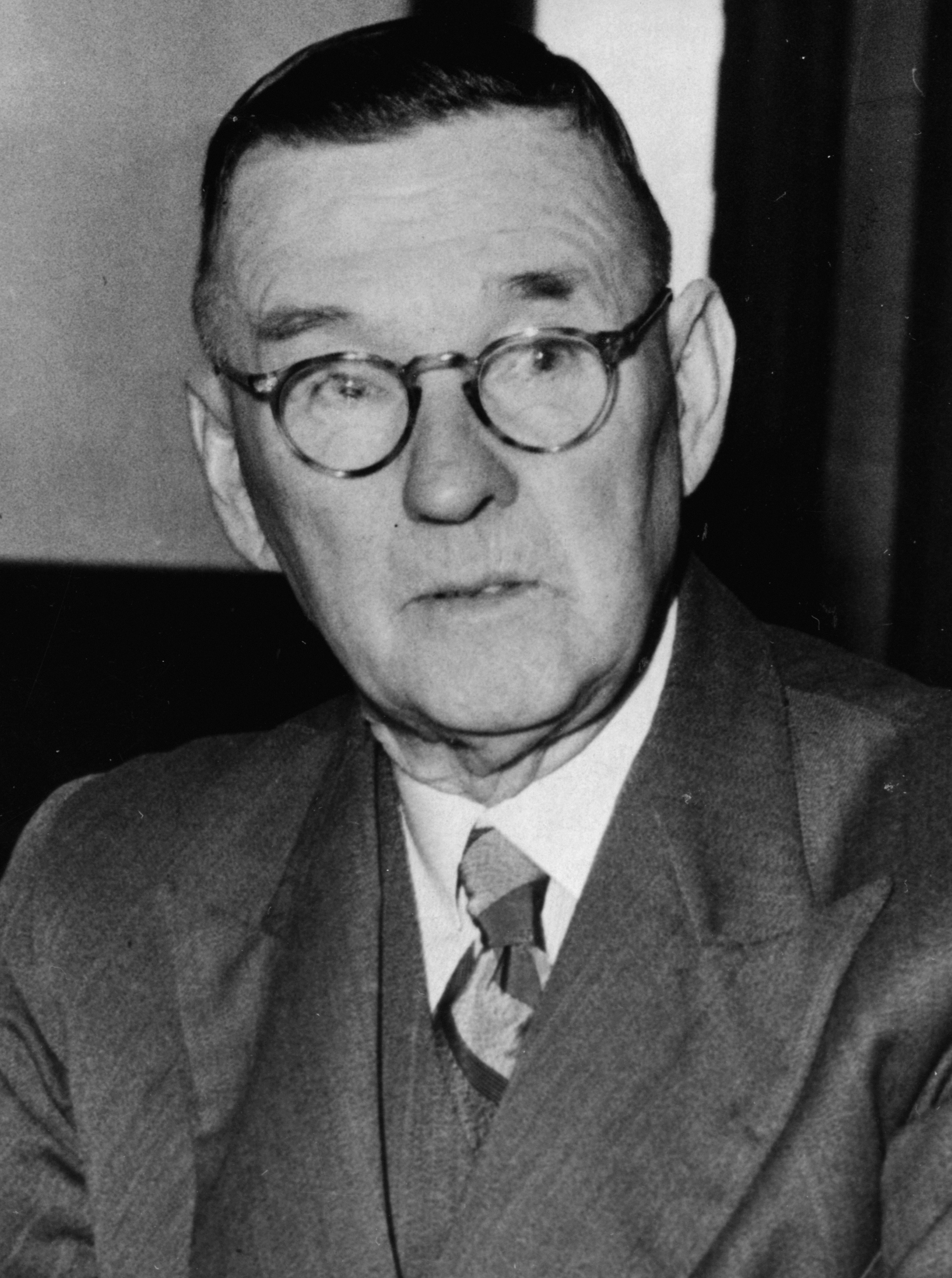
- Cooper as Treasurer in 1940.

25th Premier of Queensland
- In office 16 September 1942 – 7 March 1946
- Monarch: George VI
- Governor: Leslie Wilson
- Deputy: Ned Hanlon
- Preceded by: William Forgan Smith
- Succeeded by: Ned Hanlon

29th Treasurer of Queensland
- In office 12 April 1938 – 27 April 1944
- Premier: William Forgan Smith
- Preceded by: William Forgan Smith
- Succeeded by: Ned Hanlon

Member of the Queensland Legislative Assembly for Bremer
- In office 22 May 1915 – 12 March 1946
- Preceded by: James Cribb
- Succeeded by: Jim Donald

Personal details
- Born: Frank Arthur Cooper; 16 July 1872 Blayney, New South Wales Colony
- Died: 30 November 1949 (aged 77) Kedron, Queensland, Australia
- Party: Labor
- Spouse: Agnes Maisie Hardy
- Occupation: Politician; Journalist; Unionist

Frank Arthur Cooper (16 July 1872 – 30 November 1949) was Premier of Queensland from 1942 to 1946 for the Labor Party.

He was born on 16 July 1872 at Blayney, New South Wales, the son of an English miller and his Irish wife who had immigrated to Australia. Frank was educated in Sydney and worked as a clerk in various capacities around Sydney, including the Sydney diocese of the Anglican church and the Westinghouse brake company. In the latter capacity he moved to postings around the country before settling in Ipswich, Queensland where the main railway workshops for the State of Queensland were located. Cooper joined the Brisbane Clerical Union and became involved in Labor politics in Ipswich, including as president and secretary of the Ipswich Workers' Political Union, and was involved in the eight-hour day movement in provincial Queensland. His political activities, particularly his support for workers strikes in the state in 1912, caused him to run afoul of employer and he was dismissed, and Cooper subsequently became a journalist and activist within the Labor movement. He became editor of the Queensland Leader, a workers publication in Ipswich, in 1915 and remained so until 1925.

In 1915 he was selected to run for the seat of Bremer in the Queensland Parliament, a seat based in Ipswich which he would hold for the next three decades. In 1924 he became an alderman and eventually deputy-mayor for Ipswich City Council. The following year, he married Agnes Hardy.

Cooper had joined the first majority ALP government in Queensland under T. J. Ryan shortly after his election and became a prominent and well regarded member of the administration. Labor went back to opposition in 1929 but Cooper soon distinguished himself as an effective debater and parliamentarian. His reputation was such that he became Assistant Treasurer and Secretary for Public Instruction upon the election of William Forgan Smith as premier of a new ALP government in 1932. By 1938 Cooper was sitting on the Queensland ALP's central executive and was treasurer. He excelled in the position: that year he delivered the state's first budget surplus since 1927. Deputy Premier from 1940 to 1942, he played a key role in preparing Queensland's resources and mobilization for the outbreak of World War II in the Pacific.

In 1942, the Federal ALP government under Prime Minister John Curtin introduced uniform taxation which ended the system of dual income taxes levied by both the states and the Commonwealth, instead making the Commonwealth the sole collector of income taxes with grants to be given back to the states to compensate for any losses. Many states, including Queensland, challenged the law in the High Court but were ultimately unsuccessful. William Forgan Smith reluctantly acceded to Curtin's plan, but resigned soon after, and Cooper duly became Premier of Queensland.

The septuagenarian Cooper soon showed himself to possess an energetic leadership style which rivalled that of many a younger politician. He was an ardent supporter of the Commonwealth's prosecution of the war effort and worked with Curtin closely, sometimes invoking the ire of his own party in Queensland. He continued as Premier for the rest of the war and for the first months of the peace. In 1946 he resigned from the legislature, and Edward "Ned" Hanlon (who had been Treasurer since 1942) became Premier.

After leaving the parliament, Cooper remained active in the Anglican synod and on the senate of the University of Queensland. He died at his home in Kedron (a Brisbane suburb) in 1949; his State funeral included a procession from St John's Cathedral to the Mount Thompson crematorium.

Political offices
Preceded by William Forgan Smith	Premier of Queensland; 1942–1946	Succeeded by Ned Hanlon
Party political offices
Preceded by William Forgan Smith	Leader of the Labor Party in Queensland; 1942–1946	Succeeded by Ned Hanlon
Parliament of Queensland
Preceded by James Cribb	Member for Bremer; 1915–1946	Succeeded by Jim Donald
