= Ipswich Hospital, Queensland =

Coordinates: 27°37′9.36″S 152°45′31.83″E

Ipswich Hospital
- Queensland Health
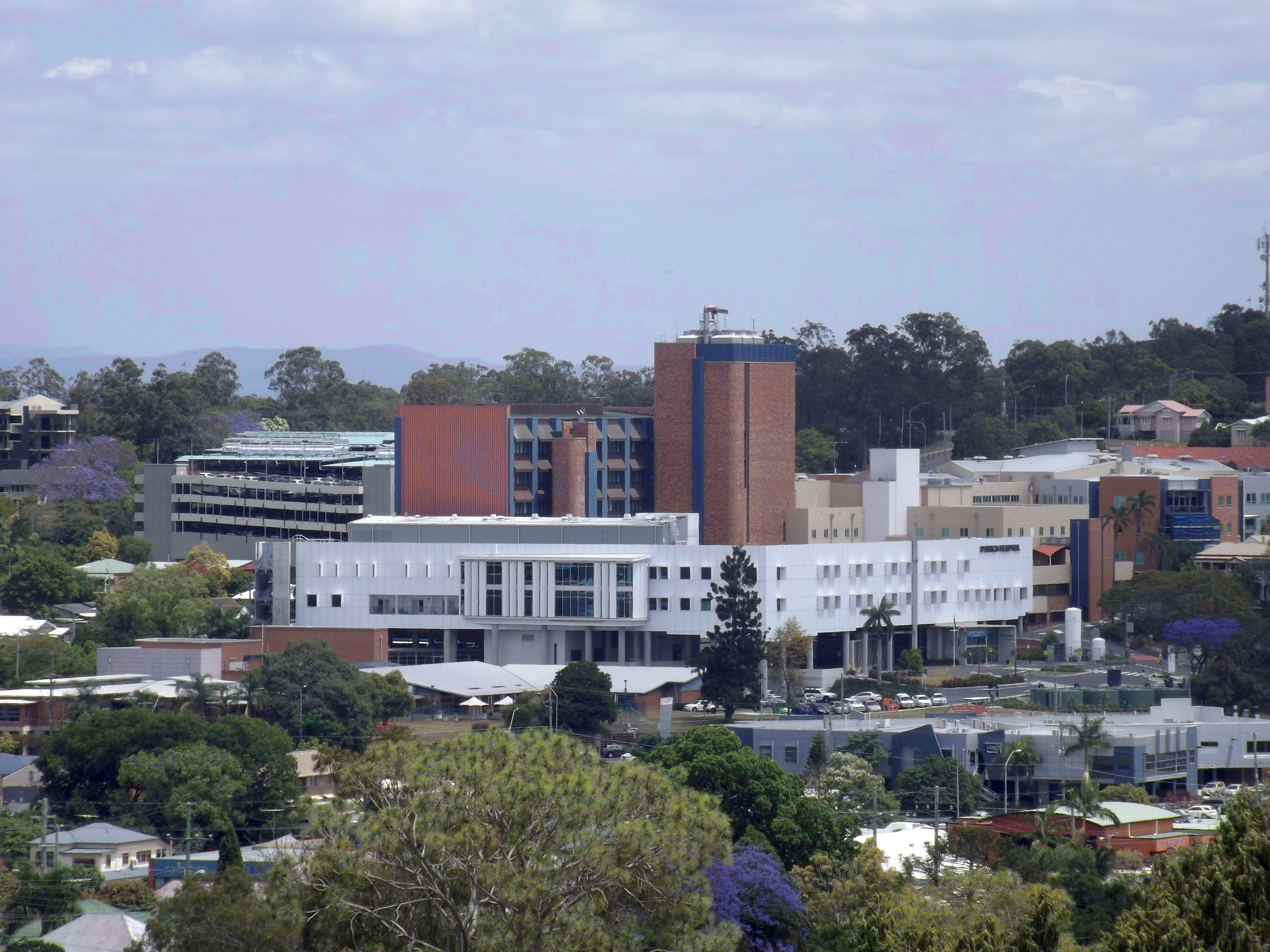
- Ipswich Hospital

Geography
- Location: Chelmsford Avenue, Ipswich, Queensland, Australia, Queensland, Australia

Organisation
- Care system: Medicare
- Type: Teaching
- Affiliated university: University of Queensland

Services
- Beds: 351

History
- Opened: 1860

Ipswich Hospital is a major acute teaching hospital located 40 kilometres west of Brisbane in Ipswich, Queensland, Australia. The hospital is part of the West Moreton Hospital and Health Service which provides services for over 280,000 people within the 9,521 kilometre West Moreton region. Ipswich Hospital has 351 beds and has specialities including anaesthetics, emergency, medicine, surgery, intensive and coronary care, orthopaedics, obstetrics, paediatrics, palliative care, rehabilitation, mental health and allied health services.

== History ==
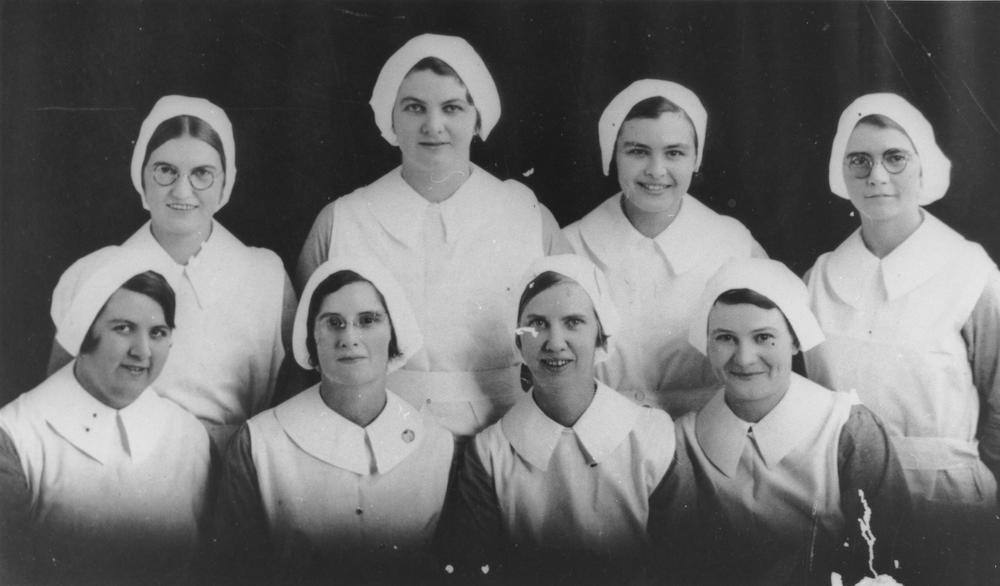
Group of Ipswich Hospital nursing students, ca. 1930. The students included in the back row from left to right: Jean McLelland (POW in Japan for three years during World War II), Ruth Robson, Sylvia Rudd, Elsie Spencer. In the front row from left to right were: Elaine Jones, Frances Leetch, Mavis Munsell, and Rita Cooney.

1860

On 3 March 1860, Ipswich Hospital opened to the public with the first patient admitted the next day.

1980

The Ipswich Triage Scale developed by Dr Gerry Fitzgerald for the Ipswich Emergency Department in the 1980s, became the basis of the Australasian National Triage Scale adopted by the Australasian College for Emergency Medicine and the Australian Government. The system was adapted for use by emergency systems in the United Kingdom and Canada.

2006

The Government of Queensland announced a further expansion of Ipswich Hospital with an additional 84 beds at a cost of $122 million. A commitment has also been made to increase the paediatric services at Ipswich Hospital with an additional six beds and a dedicated paediatric emergency area at a cost of $6.7 million.

2008

Additional funding was allocated for the provision of a sixth operating theatre which would allow for an additional 500 procedures per year.

2010

Celebrating the hospital's 150th anniversary, a gala ball was held on 26 February 2010. The Australian Medical Association of Queensland reported that the waiting list for elective surgery at Ipswich Hospital had decreased by 5% and waiting for specialist outpatient appointments had dropped by 14%. The hospital had 304 beds with more than 35,000 admissions and treated approximately 49,000 people per year as one of Queensland's busiest emergency departments.

2014

The Ipswich Hospital Expansion Project transformed the existing hospital into a new, expanded facility. The Government of Queensland committed $122 million to accommodate an additional 84 beds and associated facilities.

== See also ==
- List of hospitals in Australia
