= Samuel Shenton (architect) =

Australian architect

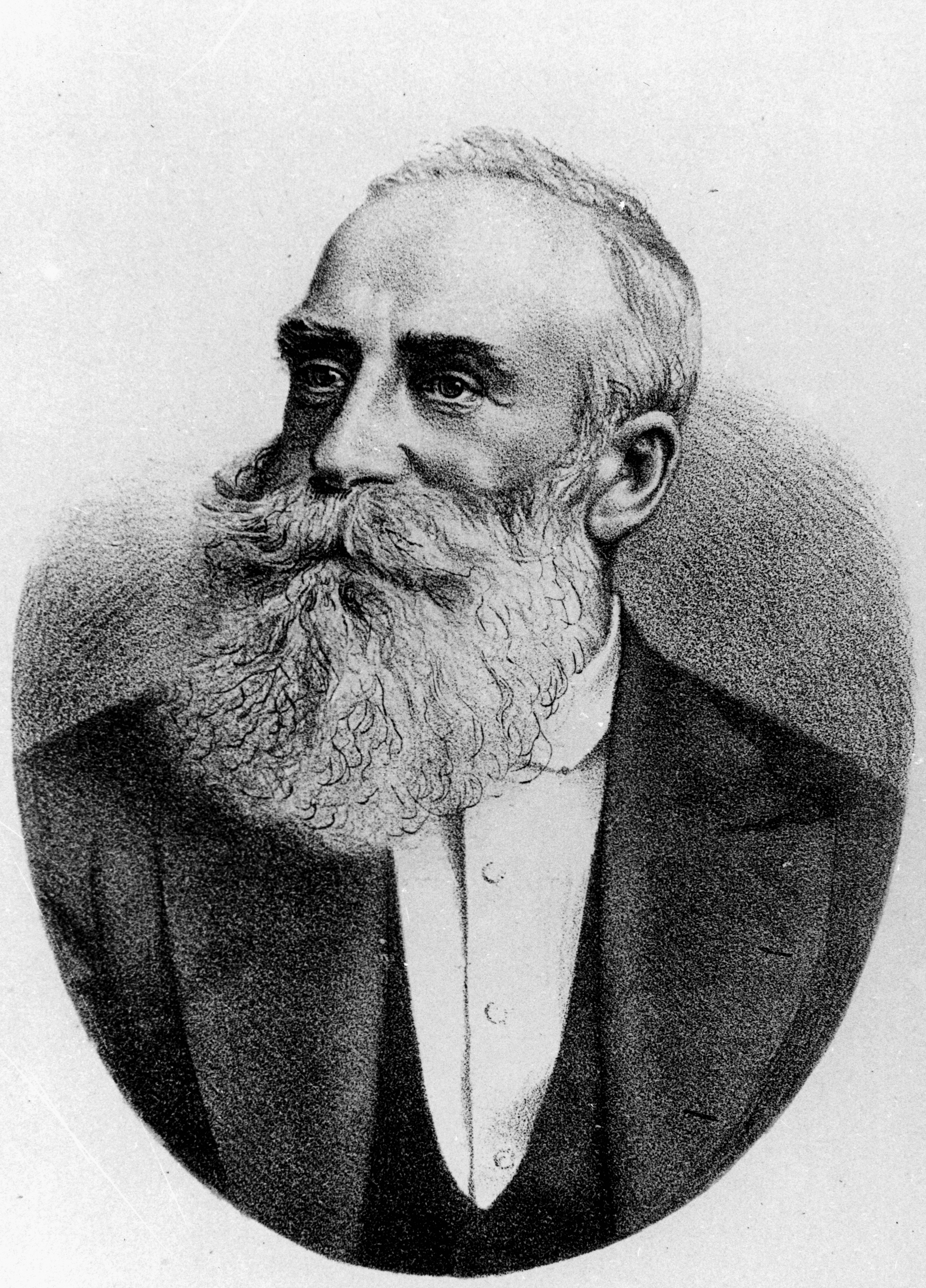
- Samuel Shenton
- Born: July 8, 1829; Leicester, England
- Died: July 3, 1893 (aged 63); Rose Hill, Newtown
- Occupations: Building contractor, architect and politician
- Known for: Mayor of Ipswich (twice)

Samuel Shenton (8 July 1829 – 3 July 1893) was a building contractor, architect and politician in Ipswich, Queensland, Australia. He was mayor of Ipswich. A number of the buildings he designed are listed on the Queensland Heritage Register.

== Early life ==
Samuel Shenton was born at Leicester, England on 8 July 1829, the son of a building contractor of that town. At thirteen years of age he was apprenticed as a carpenter and joiner, and subsequently acquired good practical experience in his trade at Liverpool. On the advice of his sister Elizabeth who had already immigrated to Australia, on 26 October 1850 he sailed on the Tartar from Plymouth arriving in Sydney on 8 February 1851. After a fortnight's stay in Sydney, he arrived in South Brisbane on 1 March 1851 and in Ipswich on the following day. He was accompanied by his mother and sister, and also by the Rev. Thomas Deacon and his niece, Eliza Thorpe. Shenton at once commenced business as a carpenter and contractor. In the early 1850s he also acted as an undertaker in Ipswich, organising burials. However, as he did not have a hearse, the coffins were carried to the cemetery in a firewood cart.

His early works included:

- Dr. Challinor's house and shop in Brisbane Street (subsequently destroyed by fire)
- Mr. P. Cardew's residence at Rhossilli
- the Ellenborough Street Wesleyan Church and parsonage
- the Congregational Church in Brisbane-street
- the Ipswich School of Arts
- Mr. G. H. Wilson's residence
- the Lands Office.

He also fitted up the first church in which the Rev. Edward Griffith (father of the Queensland Premier Samuel Griffith) preached on his arrival in the Queensland colony and also the first Presbyterian Church for the late Rev. Dr. Nelson (father of the Queensland Colonial Treasurer).

About 1879 ago he retired from the active work of contracting, and devoted his attention to the architectural part of the business, carrying on business as an architect for many years in the premises, in Brisbane Street, later occupied by his successor, George Brockwell Gill. Buildings designed by Samuel Shenton include:

- the Queensland Times
- Messrs. Hughes and Cameron's buildings
- the Ipswich Hospital premises, including the doctor's residence and the Jubilee ward
- the North Star Hotel
- residences of J. C. Cribb, E. W. Hargreaves, C. C. Cameron, G. R. Wilson. J. W. Daisey, and R. Gill

== Politics ==
Shenton always took an active part in public matters, having been twice Mayor of Ipswich. He was first elected as an alderman in February, 1863, and served in the Council for three years; was again elected in 1869 for one year; and at the end of that time was again returned, this time at the head of the poll. He occupied the Mayoral chair in the years 1872 and 1873, and during that time had the honour of receiving the Marquis of Normanby and his lady on their first visit to Ipswich, when a public banquet and ball were given to commemorate their visit. In 1888, he was again requested to offer himself as an alderman for the East Ward, and was elected without opposition.

He was also connected with most of the societies that tended to promote the welfare of the town and district. In 1854, he was one of the founders of the subscription library and reading rooms, which formed the nucleus of the School of Arts; took an active interest in the Ipswich and West Moreton Horticultural and Agricultural Society, and the Queensland Pastoral and Agricultural Society, being once or twice president of the latter. For many years in succession he was chairman of the trustees of the Ipswich General Cemetery, and was as a director, and in other ways, connected with several building societies.

He was also a director of the Ipswich Gas Company for many years, and was one of the trustees for the Ipswich Girls' Grammar School. He was among the promoters of tihe Queensland Woollen Company, and held the office of director for several years from its foundation, and also took an active part in the establishment of the present Cotton Company.

== Personal life ==
On 12 January 1953, Samuel Shenton married Eliza Thorpe, a niece of the Rev. Thomas Deacon at the United Evangelical Church in Brisbane. After residing in West Street for several years, he purchased a beautiful site known as Rose Hill, Newtown, where he lived the rest of his life.

== Later life ==
In March 1891, Shenton had a buggy accident, which crushed his side, and brought on lung disease, eventually developing into pulmonary phthisis. Although he was not able to take that active part in public matters which characterised his life up to the time of the accident, he was able to drive about in his buggy until a week before his death, when he had to take to his bed. Despite every care on the part of his wife and friends he died at his villa residence, Rose Hill, Newtown, at 4:20am on 3 July 1893.

The funeral took place at 3 o'clock on 4 July 1893. It was attended by the members of the Ipswich Municipal Council.
