= Electoral district of Bremer =

Former state electoral district of Queensland, Australia

Bremer Queensland—Legislative Assembly
- State: Queensland
- Dates current: 1872-1878, 1910-1959
- Namesake: Bremer River

Bremer was a Legislative Assembly electorate in the state of Queensland.

== History ==
Bremer was established as a single-member electorate by the Electoral Districts Act of 1872. However, in 1878, it was abolished and absorbed into the Electoral district of Ipswich, changing Ipswich from a single-member to two-member constituency.

Bremer was then resurrected under the 1910 Electoral Districts Act and continued until 1959 when it was again abolished and the major part of the electorate became the new Electoral district of Ipswich East.

== Members ==
The following people were elected in Bremer:

First incarnation (1873–1878)
Member	Party	Term
John Malbon Thompson	Unaligned	1873–1878
Second incarnation (1912–1960)
James Clarke Cribb	Liberal	1912–1915
Frank Cooper	Labor	1915–1946
Jim Donald	Labor	1946–1960

== See also ==
- Electoral districts of Queensland
- Members of the Queensland Legislative Assembly by year
- Category:Members of the Queensland Legislative Assembly by name
