= Members of the Queensland Legislative Assembly, 1888–1893 =

This is a list of members of the 10th Legislative Assembly of Queensland from 1888 to 1893, as elected at the 1888 colonial election held between 28 April 1888 and 26 May 1888 (due to problems of distance and communications, it was not possible to hold the elections on a single day).

The election was a decisive defeat for Samuel Griffith's Liberals, with Thomas McIlwraith's Conservatives becoming ascendant. During the term, a number of Liberals and Independents joined the Ministry, and by the end of the term, the terms "Ministerial" and "Opposition" were being used to describe members.

Name	Party	Electorate	Term in office
Walter Adams^{[8]}	Conservative	Bundaberg	1886–1892
George Agnew	Conservative	Nundah	1888–1896
Robert Aland	Ind. Opp.	Drayton and Toowoomba	1881–1893
William Allan	Conservative	Cunningham	1881–1883; 1887–1896
John Annear	Liberal/Min.	Maryborough	1884–1902
Archibald Archer	Independent	Rockhampton	1867–1869; 1878–1886; 1888–1896
Andrew Henry Barlow	Liberal/Min.	Ipswich	1888–1896
Matthew Battersby	Conservative	Moreton	1888–1899
Maurice Hume Black	Conservative	Mackay	1881–1993
William Villiers Brown^{[4]}	Independent	Townsville	1885–1888; 1891–1893
John Buckland^{[7]}	Liberal/Opp.	Bulimba	1882–1892
James John Cadell^{[5]}	Independent	Burnett	1891–1896
Albert Callan^{[1]}	Independent	Fitzroy	1889–1902
James Campbell	Conservative	Aubigny	1884–1893
Richard Casey	Conservative	Warrego	1888–1893
William Henry Corfield	Conservative	Gregory	1888–1899
Alfred Cowley	Conservative	Herbert	1888–1907
James Crombie	Conservative	Mitchell	1888–1898
David Dalrymple	Independent/Min.	Mackay	1888–1904
James Dickson^{[7]}	Independent/Min.	Bulimba	1873–1888; 1892–1901
John Donaldson	Ind. Opp.	Bulloo	1883–1893; 1896
James Drake	Liberal/Opp.	Enoggera	1888–1899
Robert Dunsmure	Conservative	Maranoa	1888–1893
James Foote^{[9]}	Liberal/Opp.	Rosewood	1873–1878; 1880–1888; 1892–1893
Justin Foxton	Liberal/Min.	Carnarvon	1883–1904
Michael Gannon	Ind. Opp.	Toombul	1888–1893
Thomas Glassey	Labour	Bundamba	1888–1893; 1894–1901
Louis Goldring	Ind. Opp.	Flinders	1888–1893
Samuel Griffith	Liberal/Opp.	North Brisbane	1872–1893
Samuel Grimes	Liberal/Min.	Oxley	1878–1902
William Henry Groom	Liberal/Opp.	Drayton and Toowoomba	1862–1901
George Hall^{[8]}	Labour	Bundaberg	1892–1893
John Hamilton	Conservative	Cook	1878–1904
William Hodgkinson	Liberal/Opp.	Warrego	1873–1875; 1888–1893
John Hoolan^{[2]}	Labour	Burke	1890–1894; 1896–1899
Ernest Hunter^{[2]}	Liberal/Opp.	Burke	1888–1890
Richard Hyne	Liberal/Opp.	Maryborough	1888–1893
Jean-Baptiste Isambert^{[9]}	Liberal/Opp.	Rosewood	1882–1892
John Jessop	Ind. Opp.	Dalby	1882–1893
George Hall Jones^{[5]}	Conservative	Burnett	1888–1891
Rees Jones	Conservative	North Rockhampton	1888–1893
Hon Henry Jordan^{[3]}	Liberal/Opp.	South Brisbane	1860; 1868–1871; 1883–1890
Isidor Lissner	Conservative	Kennedy	1883–1893; 1896–1899
William Little	Independent/Min.	Woothakata	1888–1893
Abraham Luya	Conservative	South Brisbane	1888–1893; 1899
Robert Lyons^{[1]}	Conservative	Fitzroy	1888–1889
John MacFarlane	Liberal/Min.	Ipswich	1878–1894
Thomas McIlwraith	Conservative	North Brisbane	1870–1871; 1873–1886; 1888–1896
John McMaster	Liberal/Min.	Fortitude Valley	1885–1899; 1901–1904; 1907–1908
John Murtagh Macrossan^{[4]}	Conservative	Townsville	1873–1878; 1879–1891
Mathew Mellor	Liberal/Opp.	Gympie	1883–1893
Boyd Dunlop Morehead	Conservative	Balonne	1871–1880; 1883–1896
Arthur Morgan	Independent/Opp.	Warwick	1887–1896; 1898–1906
Arthur Morry^{[3]}	Liberal/Opp.	South Brisbane	1890–1893
Frank Reid Murphy^{[6]}	Conservative	Barcoo	1885–1892
John Murray	Conservative	Normanby	1888–1901
Hugh Nelson	Conservative	Murilla	1883–1898
William North	Conservative	Lockyer	1888–1893
Albert Norton	Conservative	Port Curtis	1878–1893
William O'Connell	Conservative	Musgrave	1888–1903
Patrick O'Sullivan	Independent/Min.	Stanley	1860–1863; 1867–1868; 1876–1883; 1888–1893
Edward Palmer	Conservative	Carpentaria	1883–1893
William Pattison	Conservative	Rockhampton	1886–1893
Sheffield Paul	Conservative	Leichhardt	1878–1879; 1888–1893
Patrick Perkins	Conservative	Cambooya	1877–1884; 1888–1893
Robert Philp	Conservative	Townsville	1886–1915
Thomas Plunkett	Conservative	Albert	1888–1896; 1899–1908
Charles Powers	Conservative	Burrum	1888–1896
Arthur Rutledge	Liberal/Opp.	Charters Towers	1878–1893; 1899–1904
Tommy Ryan^{[6]}	Labour	Barcoo	1892–1893
William Salkeld	Liberal/Opp.	Fassifern	1883–1893
Robert Sayers	Independent	Charters Towers	1888–1893
Robert Harrison Smith	Conservative	Bowen	1888–1902
William Smyth	Liberal/Min.	Gympie	1883–1899
William Stephens	Liberal/Min.	Woolloongabba	1888–1904; 1907–1908
Ernest James Stevens	Independent	Logan	1878–1896
John Stevenson	Conservative	Clermont	1876–1893
Horace Tozer	Independent/Min.	Wide Bay	1871; 1888–1898
Theodore Unmack	Liberal/Min.	Toowong	1888–1893
John Watson	Conservative	Fortitude Valley	1888–1896
Frederick Wimble	Liberal/Opp.	Cairns	1888–1893

== See also ==
- Premier:

Thomas McIlwraith (Conservative) (1888)
Boyd Dunlop Morehead (Conservative) (1888–1890)
Samuel Griffith (Ministerial) (1890–1893)
Thomas McIlwraith (Ministerial) (1893)

== Notes ==
^{1} On 17 July 1889, Robert Lyons, the member for Fitzroy, resigned. Albert Callan won the resulting by-election on 3 August 1889.
^{2} On 24 June 1890, Ernest Hunter, the member for Burke, resigned following his being adjudicated as insolvent. Labour candidate John Hoolan won the resulting by-election on 9 August 1890.
^{3} On 30 June 1890, Henry Jordan, one of the two members for South Brisbane, died. Arthur Morry won the resulting by-election on 17 July 1890.
^{4} On 30 March 1891, John Murtagh Macrossan, one of the two members for Townsville, died. William Villiers Brown won the resulting by-election on 2 May 1891.
^{5} On 12 June 1891, George Hall Jones, the member for Burnett, resigned. James Cadell won the resulting by-election on 11 July 1891.
^{6} On 24 January 1892, Frank Reid Murphy, the member for Barcoo, died. Labour candidate Tommy Ryan won the resulting by-election on 5 March 1892.
^{7} On 29 March 1892, John Buckland, the member for Bulimba, resigned following his being adjudicated as insolvent. James Dickson won the resulting by-election on 16 April 1892.
^{8} On 15 May 1892, Walter Adams, the member for Bundaberg, died. Labour candidate George Hall won the resulting by-election on 16 June 1892.
^{9} On 15 October 1892, Jean-Baptiste Isambert, the member for Rosewood, resigned following his being adjudicated as insolvent. James Foote won the resulting by-election on 15 November 1892.
