= Electoral results for the district of Fitzroy (Queensland) =

Queensland, Australia, district election results

This is a list of electoral results for the Electoral district of Fitzroy in Queensland state elections.

== Members for Fitzroy ==
First incarnation (1888–1960)
Member	Party	Term
Robert Lyons	Conservative	1888–1889
Albert Callan	Independent	1889–1902
Henri Cowap	Labor	1902–1907
Henri Cowap	Kidstonites	1907–1909
James Crawford	Labor	1909–1911
James Crawford	Independent	1911–1912
Kenneth Grant	Liberal	1912–1915
Harold Hartley	Labor	1915–1929
William Carter	Country and Progressive National	1929–1932
Jens Peterson	Country and Progressive National	1932–1935
Jim Clark	Labor	1935–1960
Second incarnation (1992–2009)
Member	Party	Term
Jim Pearce	Labor	1992–2009

== Election results ==
=== Elections in the 2000s ===
Results for the 2006 election were:

2006 Queensland state election: Fitzroy
Party	Candidate	Votes	%	±%
Labor	Jim Pearce	13,617	63.94	+1.59
National	John Engwicht	6,639	31.17	−6.48
Independent	David Foster	1,041	4.89	+4.89
Total formal votes		21,297	98.39	+0.32
Informal votes		348	1.61	−0.32
Turnout		21,645	91.67	−1.00
Two-party-preferred result
Labor	Jim Pearce	13,817	66.40	+4.05
National	John Engwicht	6,992	33.60	−4.05
Labor hold		Swing	+4.05	

2004 Queensland state election: Fitzroy
Party	Candidate	Votes	%	±%
Labor	Jim Pearce	13,279	62.35	−0.42
National	John Engwicht	8,019	37.65	+9.09
Total formal votes		21,298	98.07	−0.34
Informal votes		420	1.93	+0.34
Turnout		21,718	92.67	−1.19
Labor hold		Swing	−4.83	

2001 Queensland state election: Fitzroy
Party	Candidate	Votes	%	±%
Labor	Jim Pearce	13,599	62.8	+16.1
National	Rod Lawrie	6,187	28.6	+5.4
City Country Alliance	Di Schuback	1,879	8.7	+8.7
Total formal votes		21,665	98.4	
Informal votes		351	1.6	
Turnout		22,016	93.7	
Two-party-preferred result
Labor	Jim Pearce	13,915	67.2	+8.6
National	Rod Lawrie	6,797	32.8	−8.6
Labor hold		Swing	+8.6	

=== Elections in the 1990s ===
1998 Queensland state election: Fitzroy
Party	Candidate	Votes	%	±%
Labor	Jim Pearce	10,214	52.2	−4.4
One Nation	Joan Wilson	4,402	22.5	+22.5
National	Richie Bills	4,069	20.8	−22.6
Australia First	Christopher Chatham	641	3.3	+3.3
Democrats	Peter Cvetko-Lueger	241	1.2	+1.2
Total formal votes		19,567	99.2	+0.6
Informal votes		161	0.8	−0.6
Turnout		19,728	93.9	+1.8
Two-candidate-preferred result
Labor	Jim Pearce	11,276	60.7	+4.1
One Nation	Joan Wilson	7,295	39.3	+39.3
Labor hold		Swing	+4.1	

1995 Queensland state election: Fitzroy
Party	Candidate	Votes	%	±%
Labor	Jim Pearce	11,061	56.6	−0.1
National	Karen Mackay	8,473	43.4	+16.7
Total formal votes		19,534	98.6	+0.2
Informal votes		268	1.4	−0.2
Turnout		19,802	92.1	+0.2
Labor hold		Swing	−5.4	

1992 Queensland state election: Fitzroy
Party	Candidate	Votes	%	±%
Labor	Jim Pearce	11,551	56.7	−0.1
National	Marie Mahood	5,450	26.7	−9.3
Liberal	Dick Phillips	1,731	8.5	+7.6
Independent	Keith Scantlebury	1,646	8.1	+8.1
Total formal votes		20,378	98.4	
Informal votes		329	1.6	
Turnout		20,707	91.9	
Two-party-preferred result
Labor	Jim Pearce	12,092	62.0	+2.5
National	Marie Mahood	7,412	38.0	−2.5
Labor hold		Swing	+2.5	

=== Elections in the 1950s ===
1957 Queensland state election: Fitzroy
Party	Candidate	Votes	%	±%
Labor	Jim Clark	3,743	43.1	−19.5
Liberal	Gordon Dunn	2,693	31.0	−5.3
Queensland Labor	John Norton	2,255	25.9	+25.9
Total formal votes		8,691	99.3	+0.3
Informal votes		62	0.7	−0.3
Turnout		8,753	95.6	+0.1
Labor hold		Swing	−5.1	

1956 Queensland state election: Fitzroy
Party	Candidate	Votes	%	±%
Labor	Jim Clark	5,472	62.6	−6.9
Liberal	Gerard Davies	3,175	36.3	+7.6
Communist	Eric Browne	100	1.1	−0.7
Total formal votes		8,747	99.0	−0.1
Informal votes		91	1.0	+0.1
Turnout		8,838	95.5	+0.5
Labor hold		Swing	−7.2	

1953 Queensland state election: Fitzroy
Party	Candidate	Votes	%	±%
Labor	Jim Clark	6,028	69.5	+7.6
Liberal	William Hoare	2,490	28.7	−9.4
Communist	Eric Browne	157	1.8	+1.8
Total formal votes		8,675	99.1	+0.1
Informal votes		78	0.9	−0.1
Turnout		8,753	95.0	+1.8
Labor hold		Swing	+8.9	

1950 Queensland state election: Fitzroy
Party	Candidate	Votes	%	±%
Labor	Jim Clark	5,377	61.9	
Liberal	Hugh Douglas	3,313	38.1	
Total formal votes		8,690	99.0	
Informal votes		84	1.0	
Turnout		8,774	93.2	
Labor hold		Swing		

=== Elections in the 1940s ===
1947 Queensland state election: Fitzroy
Party	Candidate	Votes	%	±%
Labor	Jim Clark	5,538	54.7	+3.3
People's Party	Harry Weir	4,437	43.8	−4.8
Frank Barnes Labor	Gordon Loukes	103	1.0	+1.0
Independent	John Wharton	51	0.5	+0.5
Total formal votes		10,129	99.3	+0.3
Informal votes		67	0.7	−0.3
Turnout		10,196	93.5	+9.0
Labor hold		Swing	+4.1	

1944 Queensland state election: Fitzroy
Party	Candidate	Votes	%	±%
Labor	Jim Clark	4,832	51.4	−48.6
People's Party	Harry Weir	4,563	48.6	+48.6
Total formal votes		9,395	99.0	
Informal votes		93	1.0	
Turnout		9,488	84.5	
Labor hold		Swing	N/A	

1941 Queensland state election: Fitzroy
Party	Candidate	Votes	%	±%
Labor	Jim Clark	unopposed		
Labor hold		Swing		

=== Elections in the 1930s ===
1938 Queensland state election: Fitzroy
Party	Candidate	Votes	%	±%
Labor	Jim Clark	5,222	55.0	−8.3
Country	Edwin Hiskens	3,616	38.1	+1.5
Social Credit	Sidney Cooper	650	6.9	+6.9
Total formal votes		9,488	99.4	+0.9
Informal votes		57	0.6	−0.9
Turnout		9,545	93.4	−0.9
Labor hold		Swing	N/A	

- Preferences were not distributed.

1935 Queensland state election: Fitzroy
Party	Candidate	Votes	%	±%
Labor	Jim Clark	5,587	63.3	
CPNP	Albert Pearson	3,233	36.7	
Total formal votes		8,820	98.5	
Informal votes		133	1.5	
Turnout		8,953	94.3	
Labor gain from CPNP		Swing		

1932 Queensland state election: Fitzroy
Party	Candidate	Votes	%	±%
CPNP	Jens Peterson	3,685	49.8	
Labor	Thomas Maher	3,413	46.2	
Queensland Party	Robert Hartley	254	3.4	
Independent	Clarence Wain	40	0.5	
Total formal votes		7,392	99.1	
Informal votes		69	0.9	
Turnout		7,461	95.4	
Two-party-preferred result
CPNP	Jens Peterson	3,763	52.1	
Labor	Thomas Maher	3,452	47.8	
CPNP hold		Swing		

=== Elections in the 1920s ===
1929 Queensland state election: Fitzroy
Party	Candidate	Votes	%	±%
CPNP	William Carter	4,073	59.8	+18.2
Labor	Harry Hartley	2,737	40.2	−18.2
Total formal votes		6,810	98.7	+0.3
Informal votes		89	1.3	−0.3
Turnout		6,899		
CPNP gain from Labor		Swing	+18.2	

1926 Queensland state election: Fitzroy
Party	Candidate	Votes	%	±%
Labor	Harry Hartley	3,787	58.4	+6.0
CPNP	Frank Dawson	2,699	41.6	−6.0
Total formal votes		6,486	98.4	−0.6
Informal votes		107	1.6	+0.6
Turnout		6,593	84.0	+2.7
Labor hold		Swing	+6.0	

1923 Queensland state election: Fitzroy
Party	Candidate	Votes	%	±%
Labor	Harry Hartley	3,093	52.4	−1.6
United	Hugh Grant	2,805	47.6	+1.6
Total formal votes		5,898	99.0	+0.6
Informal votes		61	1.0	−0.6
Turnout		5,959	81.3	+0.8
Labor hold		Swing	−1.6	

1920 Queensland state election: Fitzroy
Party	Candidate	Votes	%	±%
Labor	Harry Hartley	3,383	54.0	0.0
National	Frederick Lodge	2,882	46.0	0.0
Total formal votes		6,265	98.4	+0.2
Informal votes		100	1.6	−0.2
Turnout		6,365	80.5	−2.5
Labor hold		Swing	0.0	

=== Elections in the 1910s ===
1918 Queensland state election: Fitzroy
Party	Candidate	Votes	%	±%
Labor	Harry Hartley	3,158	54.0	+2.9
National	Kenneth Grant	2,691	46.0	−2.9
Total formal votes		5,849	98.2	+0.1
Informal votes		106	1.8	−0.1
Turnout		5,955	83.0	−2.1
Labor hold		Swing	+2.9	

1915 Queensland state election: Fitzroy
Party	Candidate	Votes	%	±%
Labor	Harry Hartley	2,403	51.1	+9.9
Liberal	Kenneth Grant	2,298	48.9	−9.9
Total formal votes		4,701	98.1	+1.1
Informal votes		93	1.9	−1.1
Turnout		4,794	85.1	+11.1
Labor gain from Liberal		Swing	+9.9	

1912 Queensland state election: Fitzroy
Party	Candidate	Votes	%	±%
Liberal	Kenneth Grant	1,925	58.8	
Labor	Charles Bluett	1,348	41.2	
Total formal votes		3,273	97.0	
Informal votes		101	3.0	
Turnout		3,374	74.0	
Liberal hold		Swing		
