= Electoral results for the district of Burke =

Queensland, Australia, district election results

This is a list of electoral results for the electoral district of Burke in Queensland state elections in Australia.

== Members for Burke ==
First incarnation (1873–1932)
Member	Party	Term			
William Hodgkinson		1873—1875			
James Parker		1875—1876			
Patrick O'Sullivan		1876—1878			
Roger Sheaffe		1878—1883	Dual member electorate (1888–1893)		
Edward Palmer		1883—1888	Member 2	Party	Term
Ernest Hunter		1888—1890	William Hodgkinson		1888—1893
John Hoolan	Labor	1890—1894	William Hodgkinson		1888—1893
Thomas Glassey	Labor	1894—1896			
John Hoolan	Labor	1896—1899			
William Maxwell	Labor	1899—1907			
William Maxwell	Kidstonites	1907—1909			
Charles Collins	Labor	1909—1912			
William Murphy	Independent	1912—1918			
Darby Riordan	Labor	1918—1929			
Arthur Jones	Labor	1929—1932			

Second incarnation (1960–1972)
Member	Party	Term
Alec Inch	Labor	1960—1972

== Election results ==
=== Elections in the 1960s ===
1969 Queensland state election: Burke
Party	Candidate	Votes	%	±%
Labor	Alex Inch	4,949	58.5	−4.1
Country	William Aplin	2,739	32.4	+7.9
Social Credit	John Donaldson	777	9.2	−3.8
Total formal votes		8,465	96.8	−0.7
Informal votes		280	3.2	+0.7
Turnout		8,745	81.3	0.0
Two-party-preferred result
Labor	Alex Inch	5,337	63.0	−6.0
Country	William Aplin	3,128	37.0	+6.0
Labor hold		Swing	−6.0	

1966 Queensland state election: Burke
Party	Candidate	Votes	%	±%
Labor	Alex Inch	4,394	62.6	−37.4
Liberal	William Presley	1,718	24.5	+24.5
Social Credit	John Donaldson	909	12.9	+12.9
Total formal votes		7,021	97.5	
Informal votes		180	2.5	
Turnout		7,201	81.3	
Two-party-preferred result
Labor	Alex Inch	4,848	69.0	−31.0
Liberal	William Presley	2,173	31.0	+31.0
Labor hold		Swing	−31.0	

1963 Queensland state election: Burke
Party	Candidate	Votes	%	±%
Labor	Alex Inch	unopposed		
Labor hold		Swing		

1960 Queensland state election: Burke
Party	Candidate	Votes	%	±%
Labor	Alex Inch	2,908	42.3	
Queensland Labor	Alfred Smith	2,294	33.3	
Country	Alexander Hindson	1,681	24.4	
Total formal votes		6,883	98.7	
Informal votes		88	1.3	
Turnout		6,971	81.4	
Labor win		(new seat)		

=== Elections in the 1920s ===
1929 Burke state by-election
Party	Candidate	Votes	%	±%
Labor	Arthur Jones	1,524	63.5	−2.3
CPNP	Robert Clarke	878	36.5	+2.3
Total formal votes		2,402	99.3	+1.8
Informal votes		17	0.7	−1.8
Turnout		2,419	49.8	−20.6
Labor hold		Swing	−2.3	

1929 Queensland state election: Burke
Party	Candidate	Votes	%	±%
Labor	Darby Riordan	2,205	65.8	−34.2
CPNP	Robert Clarke	1,148	34.2	+34.2
Total formal votes		3,353	97.5	
Informal votes		86	2.5	
Turnout		3,439	70.4	
Labor hold		Swing	N/A	

1926 Queensland state election: Burke
Party	Candidate	Votes	%	±%
Labor	Darby Riordan	unopposed		
Labor hold		Swing		

1923 Queensland state election: Burke
Party	Candidate	Votes	%	±%
Labor	Darby Riordan	1,943	61.1	−5.5
United	Campbell Murray	1,235	38.9	+5.5
Total formal votes		3,178	96.0	−1.0
Informal votes		133	4.0	+1.0
Turnout		3,311	62.8	−6.8
Labor hold		Swing	−5.5	

1920 Queensland state election: Burke
Party	Candidate	Votes	%	±%
Labor	Darby Riordan	998	66.6	+7.6
Northern Country	John Williamson	501	33.4	+33.4
Total formal votes		1,499	97.0	−0.4
Informal votes		46	3.0	+0.4
Turnout		1,545	69.6	−3.6
Labor hold		Swing	+7.6	

=== Elections in the 1910s ===
1918 Queensland state election: Burke
Party	Candidate	Votes	%	±%
Labor	Darby Riordan	886	59.0	+10.8
Independent	William Murphy	617	41.0	−10.8
Total formal votes		1,503	97.4	+1.4
Informal votes		40	2.6	−1.4
Turnout		1,543	73.2	−8.1
Labor gain from Independent		Swing	+10.8	

1915 Queensland state election: Burke
Party	Candidate	Votes	%	±%
Independent	William Murphy	828	51.8	−1.7
Labor	David Swiss-Davies	771	48.2	+1.7
Total formal votes		1,599	96.0	−3.0
Informal votes		66	4.0	+3.0
Turnout		1,665	81.3	+10.6
Independent hold		Swing	−1.7	

1912 Queensland state election: Burke
Party	Candidate	Votes	%	±%
Independent	William Murphy	1,174	53.5	
Labor	Charles Collins	1,020	46.5	
Total formal votes		2,194	99.0	
Informal votes		21	1.0	
Turnout		2,215	70.7	
Independent gain from Labor		Swing		

=== Elections in the 1890s ===
==== 1894 by-election ====
1894 Burke state by-election
Party	Candidate	Votes	%	±%
Labor	Thomas Glassey	315	79.3	
Independent	William Little	82	20.6	
Total formal votes		397		
