= Electoral results for the district of Bundamba =

Queensland, Australia, district election results

This is a list of electoral results for the electoral district of Bundamba in Queensland state elections.

== Members for Bundamba ==
First incarnation (1873–1912)
Member	Party	Term
Simon Fraser	Unaligned	1873–1878
William Hendren	Unaligned	1878–1880
James Foote	Unaligned	1880–1888
Thomas Glassey	Labor	1888–1893
Lewis Thomas	Ministerialist	1893–1899
James Cribb	Various^{1}	1899–1912
Second incarnation (1992–present)
Member	Party	Term
Bob Gibbs	Labor	1992–1999
Jo-Ann Miller	Labor	2000–2020
Lance McCallum	Labor	2020–present

== Election results ==
=== Elections in the 2020s ===
2024 Queensland state election: Bundamba
Party	Candidate	Votes	%	±%
Labor	Lance McCallum	15,326	43.66	−12.24
Liberal National	Carl Mutzelberg	8,872	25.27	+10.27
Greens	Tracey Nayler	3,743	10.66	+0.36
One Nation	Kelvin Brown	3,011	8.58	−6.32
Legalise Cannabis	Clive Brazier	1,612	4.59	+4.59
Family First	Jeremy Williams	1,150	3.28	+3.28
Animal Justice	Angela Lowery	808	2.30	−1.30
Independent Progressives	Edward Carroll	582	1.66	+1.66
Total formal votes		35,104	93.86	−1.91
Informal votes		2,296	6.14	+1.91
Turnout		37,400	82.25	−1.29
Two-party-preferred result
Labor	Lance McCallum	22,396	63.80	−7.40
Liberal National	Carl Mutzelberg	12,708	36.20	+7.40
Labor hold		Swing	–7.40	

2020 Queensland state election: Bundamba
Party	Candidate	Votes	%	±%
Labor	Lance McCallum	17,015	55.92	+2.57
Liberal National	Rob Shearman	4,635	15.23	+0.06
One Nation	Sharon Bell	4,553	14.96	+14.96
Greens	Danielle Mutton	3,127	10.28	−0.64
Animal Justice	Angela Lowery	1,099	3.61	+3.61
Total formal votes		30,429	95.77	+4.01
Informal votes		1,344	4.23	−4.01
Turnout		31,773	83.54	−0.77
Notional two-party-preferred count (Note: Estimate two-party preferred count by Antony Green.)
Labor	Lance McCallum		71.20	−0.40
Liberal National	Rob Shearman		28.80	+0.40
Two-candidate-preferred result
Labor	Lance McCallum	21,507	70.68	−0.87
One Nation	Sharon Bell	8,922	29.32	+29.32
Labor hold				

2020 Bundamba state by-election
Party	Candidate	Votes	%	±%
Labor	Lance McCallum	9,134	42.2	−11.2
One Nation	Sharon Bell	6,006	27.7	+27.7
Liberal National	Robert Shearman	3,589	16.6	+1.4
Greens	Danielle Mutton	2,924	13.5	+2.6
Total formal votes		21,653	89.1	−2.6
Informal votes		2,644	10.9	+2.6
Turnout		24,297	66.4	−22.7
Two-candidate-preferred result
Labor	Lance McCallum	12,949	59.8	−11.8
One Nation	Sharon Bell	8,704	40.2	+40.2
Labor hold				

=== Elections in the 2010s ===
2017 Queensland state election: Bundamba
Party	Candidate	Votes	%	±%
Labor	Jo-Ann Miller	13,883	53.3	−11.8
Liberal National	Patrick Herbert	3,949	15.2	−5.1
Greens	Michelle Duncan	2,842	10.9	+3.0
Independent	Patricia Petersen	2,599	10.0	+10.0
Independent	Shan-Ju Lin	1,413	5.4	+5.4
Independent	Trevor Judd	1,338	5.1	+5.1
Total formal votes		26,024	91.8	−5.9
Informal votes		2,337	8.2	+5.9
Turnout		28,361	84.3	+3.3
Two-party-preferred result
Labor	Jo-Ann Miller	18,621	71.6	−4.3
Liberal National	Patrick Herbert	7,403	28.5	+4.3
Labor hold		Swing	−4.3	

2015 Queensland state election: Bundamba
Party	Candidate	Votes	%	±%
Labor	Jo-Ann Miller	20,413	61.20	+22.27
Liberal National	Stephen Fenton	8,204	24.60	−11.05
Greens	Ava Greenwood	2,732	8.19	+3.05
Family First	Luke Harris	2,007	6.02	+2.83
Total formal votes		33,356	97.71	+0.33
Informal votes		782	2.29	−0.33
Turnout		34,138	88.82	−2.26
Two-party-preferred result
Labor	Jo-Ann Miller	22,753	71.43	+19.61
Liberal National	Stephen Fenton	9,101	28.57	−19.61
Labor hold		Swing	+19.61	

2012 Queensland state election: Bundamba
Party	Candidate	Votes	%	±%
Labor	Jo-Ann Miller	10,945	38.93	−22.39
Liberal National	Michael Kitzelmann	10,022	35.65	+12.48
Katter's Australian	Bernard Gaynor	2,461	8.75	+8.75
Independent	Angela Watson	2,213	7.87	+7.87
Greens	Jim Prentice	1,445	5.14	−2.03
Family First	Deborah Acason	897	3.19	+0.55
Independent	Alf Viskers	132	0.47	+0.47
Total formal votes		28,115	97.38	−0.22
Informal votes		756	2.62	+0.22
Turnout		28,871	91.08	+0.58
Two-party-preferred result
Labor	Jo-Ann Miller	12,354	51.82	−19.41
Liberal National	Michael Kitzelmann	11,486	48.18	+19.41
Labor hold		Swing	−19.41	

=== Elections in the 2000s ===
2009 Queensland state election: Bundamba
Party	Candidate	Votes	%	±%
Labor	Jo-Ann Miller	15,470	61.3	−7.5
Liberal National	Simon Ingram	5,846	23.2	+1.6
Greens	Ric Nattrass	1,808	7.2	−0.7
Independent	Patricia Petersen	1,026	4.1	+4.1
Family First	Bevan Smith	666	2.6	+2.6
DS4SEQ	Cameron Hodges	411	1.6	+1.6
Total formal votes		25,227	97.1	
Informal votes		621	2.9	
Turnout		25,848	90.5	
Two-party-preferred result
Labor	Jo-Ann Miller	16,559	71.2	−4.0
Liberal National	Simon Ingram	6,687	28.8	+4.0
Labor hold		Swing	−4.0	

2006 Queensland state election: Bundamba
Party	Candidate	Votes	%	±%
Labor	Jo-Ann Miller	17,101	68.5	+5.3
Liberal	Paul Cole	5,503	22.0	+3.1
Greens	James Prentice	1,955	7.8	+0.9
Independent	Alf Viskers	418	1.7	+1.7
Total formal votes		24,977	97.0	−0.5
Informal votes		768	3.0	+0.5
Turnout		25,745	91.1	−1.0
Two-party-preferred result
Labor	Jo-Ann Miller	17,781	74.8	−0.1
Liberal	Paul Cole	5,998	25.2	+0.1
Labor hold		Swing	−0.1	

2004 Queensland state election: Bundamba
Party	Candidate	Votes	%	±%
Labor	Jo-Ann Miller	14,456	63.2	−8.4
Liberal	Paul Cole	4,321	18.9	+4.0
One Nation	Mike Atkin	2,520	11.0	+11.0
Greens	Jim Prentice	1,570	6.9	−6.5
Total formal votes		22,867	97.5	+1.5
Informal votes		583	2.5	−1.5
Turnout		23,450	92.1	−1.3
Two-party-preferred result
Labor	Jo-Ann Miller	15,631	74.9	−6.0
Liberal	Paul Cole	5,241	25.1	+6.0
Labor hold		Swing	−6.0	

2001 Queensland state election: Bundamba
Party	Candidate	Votes	%	±%
Labor	Jo-Ann Miller	15,356	71.6	+23.4
Liberal	Mardi McLean	3,196	14.9	+3.0
Greens	John McKeon	2,881	13.4	+10.5
Total formal votes		21,433	96.0	
Informal votes		896	4.0	
Turnout		22,329	93.4	
Two-party-preferred result
Labor	Jo-Ann Miller	16,043	80.9	+15.3
Liberal	Mardi McLean	3,786	19.1	+19.1
Labor hold		Swing	+15.3	

2000 Bundamba state by-election
Party	Candidate	Votes	%	±%
Labor	Jo-Ann Miller	11,217	57.25	+9.09
Liberal	Michele Cole	2,909	14.85	+2.98
City Country Alliance	Heather Hill	2,723	13.90	+13.90
Greens	Sean Curley	1,134	5.79	+2.84
Independent	Colene Hughes	870	4.44	+4.44
Independent	Bill Heck	564	2.88	+2.88
Independent	Martin Poole	177	0.90	+0.90
Total formal votes		19,594	97.04	
Informal votes		597	2.96	
Turnout		20,191	84.74	
Two-party-preferred result
Labor	Jo-Ann Miller	12,383	71.07	+14.9
Liberal	Michele Cole	5,041	28.93	+28.93
Labor hold		Swing	N/A	

=== Elections in the 1990s ===
1998 Queensland state election: Bundamba
Party	Candidate	Votes	%	±%
Labor	Bob Gibbs	10,030	48.2	−10.0
One Nation	Colene Hughes	7,135	34.3	+34.3
Liberal	Jeff Matijasevic	2,472	11.9	−12.6
Greens	John McKeon	614	2.9	+2.9
Democrats	Andre Klingbeil	577	2.8	+2.8
Total formal votes		20,828	98.3	+1.4
Informal votes		358	1.7	−1.4
Turnout		21,186	92.9	+1.9
Two-candidate-preferred result
Labor	Bob Gibbs	11,213	56.2	−8.6
One Nation	Colene Hughes	8,733	43.8	+43.8
Labor hold		Swing	−8.6	

1995 Queensland state election: Bundamba
Party	Candidate	Votes	%	±%
Labor	Bob Gibbs	11,436	58.1	−11.7
Liberal	Yale Stephens	4,814	24.5	+24.5
Independent	John Ranizowski	3,425	17.4	+17.4
Total formal votes		19,675	96.9	+0.9
Informal votes		635	3.1	−0.9
Turnout		20,310	91.0	
Two-party-preferred result
Labor	Bob Gibbs	12,285	64.8	−5.0
Liberal	Yale Stephens	6,665	35.2	+35.2
Labor hold		Swing	−5.0	

1992 Queensland state election: Bundamba
Party	Candidate	Votes	%	±%
Labor	Bob Gibbs	13,019	69.8	+1.5
Independent	Hank Schimmel	5,633	30.2	+30.2
Total formal votes		18,652	96.0	
Informal votes		776	4.0	
Turnout		19,428	90.7	
Labor hold		Swing	+1.5	
