= Electoral results for the district of Carpentaria =

Queensland, Australia, district election results

This is a list of electoral results for the electoral district of Carpentaria in Queensland state elections.

== Members for Carpentaria ==
The following people were elected in the seat of Carpentaria:

First incarnation 1888–1912
Member	Party	Term
Edward Palmer	none	1888–1893
George Phillips	none	1893–1896
George Charles Sim	Labor	1896–1899
James Forsyth	Ministerial	1899–1907
Thomas Nevitt	Labor	1907–1912

Second incarnation 1932–1960
Member	Party	Term
John Mullan	Labor	1932–1941
Norm Smith	Labor	1941–1957
Norm Smith	QLP	1957–1960

== Election results ==
=== Elections in the 1950s ===
1957 Queensland state election: Carpentaria
Party	Candidate	Votes	%	±%
Queensland Labor	Norm Smith	2,832	38.6	+38.6
Labor	Alec Inch	2,292	31.3	−28.8
Country	William Aplin	2,211	30.1	−9.8
Total formal votes		7,335	99.2	+0.1
Informal votes		57	0.8	−0.1
Turnout		7,392	87.0	+5.7
Queensland Labor gain from Labor		Swing	N/A	

1956 Queensland state election: Carpentaria
Party	Candidate	Votes	%	±%
Labor	Norm Smith	3,377	60.1	−2.6
Country	William Aplin	2,240	39.9	+2.6
Total formal votes		5,617	99.1	0.0
Informal votes		50	0.9	0.0
Turnout		5,667	81.3	−2.9
Labor hold		Swing	−2.6	

1953 Queensland state election: Carpentaria
Party	Candidate	Votes	%	±%
Labor	Norm Smith	3,093	62.7	−0.2
Country	William Aplin	1,842	37.3	+5.8
Total formal votes		4,935	99.1	+0.5
Informal votes		47	0.9	−0.5
Turnout		4,982	84.2	+3.5
Labor hold		Swing	−3.9	

1950 Queensland state election: Carpentaria
Party	Candidate	Votes	%	±%
Labor	Norm Smith	2,709	62.9	
Country	George Keyes	1,358	31.5	
Independent Labor	Merv Pether	243	5.6	
Total formal votes		4,310	98.6	
Informal votes		61	1.4	
Turnout		4,371	80.7	
Labor hold		Swing		

=== Elections in the 1940s ===
1947 Queensland state election: Carpentaria
Party	Candidate	Votes	%	±%
Labor	Norm Smith	3,650	70.2	+12.7
Independent	Walter Grant	1,549	29.8	+29.8
Total formal votes		5,199	94.7	−4.0
Informal votes		290	5.3	+4.0
Turnout		5,489	83.3	+6.3
Labor hold		Swing	N/A	

1944 Queensland state election: Carpentaria
Party	Candidate	Votes	%	±%
Labor	Norm Smith	2,969	57.5	+5.7
Independent Labor	James Boyd	1,834	35.5	−12.7
Independent	John Carson	208	4.0	+4.0
Independent	Bernard McInerney	155	3.0	+3.0
Total formal votes		5,166	98.7	+0.1
Informal votes		67	1.3	−0.1
Turnout		5,233	77.0	+4.3
Labor hold		Swing	+10.0	

1941 Queensland state election: Carpentaria
Party	Candidate	Votes	%	±%
Labor	Norm Smith	3,054	51.8	−4.0
Independent	James Boyd	2,838	48.2	+48.2
Total formal votes		5,892	98.6	−0.2
Informal votes		83	1.4	+0.2
Turnout		5,975	72.7	−7.1
Labor hold		Swing	N/A	

=== Elections in the 1930s ===
1938 Queensland state election: Carpentaria
Party	Candidate	Votes	%	±%
Labor	John Mullan	3,501	55.8	−44.2
Country	James Boyd	2,775	44.2	+44.2
Total formal votes		6,276	98.8	
Informal votes		75	1.2	
Turnout		6,351	79.8	
Labor hold		Swing	N/A	

1935 Queensland state election: Carpentaria
Party	Candidate	Votes	%	±%
Labor	John Mullan	unopposed		
Labor hold		Swing		

1932 Queensland state election: Carpentaria
Party	Candidate	Votes	%	±%
Labor	John Mullan	unopposed		
Labor hold		Swing		
