= Roger Sheaffe =

Roger Sheaffe may refer to:

- Roger Hale Sheaffe (1763–1851), Loyalist general in the British Army
- Roger Sheaffe (politician) (Roger Hale Sheaffe, 1838–1895), pastoralist and member of the Queensland Legislative Assembly
