= Electoral district of Fitzroy =

Electoral district of Fitzroy may refer to:

- Electoral district of Fitzroy (Queensland), a former electorate of the Queensland Legislative Assembly
- Electoral district of Fitzroy (Victoria), a former electorate of the Victorian Legislative Assembly
