= Harold Hartley (politician) =

Australian politician

Member of the Queensland Legislative Assembly for Fitzroy
- In office 22 May 1915 – 11 May 1929
- Preceded by: Ken Grant
- Succeeded by: William Carter

Personal details
- Born: Harold Leslie Hartley; 27 May 1875 Brisbane, Queensland, Australia
- Died: 23 August 1958 (aged 83) Brisbane, Queensland, Australia
- Resting place: Toowong Cemetery
- Party: Labor Party
- Spouse: Emily Jane Campbell (m.1907 d.1957)
- Occupation: Engineer-fitter

Harold Leslie Hartley (27 May 1875 – 23 August 1958) was an engineer-fitter and member of the Queensland Legislative Assembly.

== Biography ==
Hartley was born in Brisbane, Queensland, to parents William James Hartley and his wife Maria Freeman (née Byram). He attended State Schools in Cooktown, Blackall, and Rockhampton before attending Rockhampton Grammar School. On leaving school he became an apprentice engineer at Burns & Twigg in Rockhampton before becoming an engineer-fitter with the Queensland Railways. He fought with the 3rd Bushmen's Contingent during the 2nd Boer War and upon his discharge resumed his machine-shop duties. He was a member of the Australian Workers' Union and the Amalgamated Miners' Association.

On 23 April 1907 he married Emily Jane Campbell (died 1957) in Rockhampton and together had two sons. He died in Brisbane in August 1958 and was buried in the Toowong Cemetery.

== Political career ==
Hartley, for the Labor Party, represented the state seat of Fitzroy from 1915 until 1929.

Parliament of Queensland
Preceded by Ken Grant	Member for Fitzroy; 1915–1929	Succeeded by William Carter
