= George Charles Sim =

Australian politician

George Sim

Member of the Queensland Legislative Assembly for Carpentaria
- In office 11 April 1896 – 25 March 1899
- Preceded by: George Phillips
- Succeeded by: James Forsyth

Personal details
- Born: George Charles Sim; 1847 Bradford, Yorkshire, England
- Died: 17 May 1922 (aged 74 or 75) Wynnum, Queensland, Australia
- Resting place: Toowong Cemetery
- Party: Labour Party
- Occupation: Journalist

George Charles Sim (1847 – 17 May 1922) was a journalist, and member of the Queensland Legislative Assembly.

== Early days ==
Sim was born in Bradford, Yorkshire, to parents David Sim and his wife Margaret (née Anderson). After receiving his education in Bradford, he arrived in Australia where he became a prospector and mining expert in 1870. He then became a journalist for the Carpentaria Times before moving to Brisbane to continue his career in journalism.

== Political career ==
Sim, after unsuccessfully contesting the seat of Burke in 1890, won the seat of Carpentaria in the Queensland Legislative Assembly in 1896. He held the seat for three years before being defeated in 1899.

== Personal life ==
Sim died at Wynnum in 1922 and was buried in the Toowong Cemetery.

Parliament of Queensland
Preceded by George Phillips	Member for Carpentaria; 1896–1899	Succeeded by James Forsyth
