= William Kellett =

Australian politician

Member of the Queensland Legislative Assembly for Stanley
- In office 10 December 1878 – 23 May 1888 Serving with Patrick O'Sullivan, Peter White
- Preceded by: New seat
- Succeeded by: Seat abolished

Personal details
- Born: William Kellett; 19 December 1839 Dublin, Ireland
- Died: 19 March 1916 (aged 76) Brisbane, Queensland, Australia
- Resting place: Toowong Cemetery
- Spouse: Isabel Frances Panton (d.1959)
- Occupation: Businessman

William Kellett (19 December 1839 – 19 March 1916) was an Australian politician. He was the member for Stanley in the Legislative Assembly of Queensland from 1878 to 1888.

Kellett died in 1916 and was buried in Toowong Cemetery.

Parliament of Queensland
New seat	Member for Stanley; 1878–1888; Served alongside: Patrick O'Sullivan, Peter White	Abolished
