= William Henry Summerville =

Australian politician

William Summerville
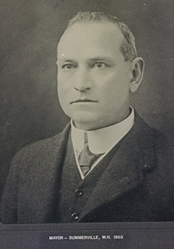

Member of the Queensland Legislative Assembly for Stanley
- In office 11 March 1902 – 27 Aug 1904
- Preceded by: Frederick Lord
- Succeeded by: Henry Somerset

Personal details
- Born: William Henry Summerville; August 1862 Ipswich, Queensland, Australia
- Died: 21 May 1919 (aged 56) Ipswich, Queensland, Australia
- Resting place: Ipswich General Cemetery
- Party: Labour
- Spouse: Annie Agnes Herbert (m.1892 d.1941)
- Occupation: Solicitor

William Henry Summerville (August 1862 – 21 May 1919) was a member of the Queensland Legislative Assembly.

== Biography ==
Summerville was born at Ipswich, Queensland, the son of Samuel Summerville and his wife Elizabeth (née Thompson). He was educated at Ipswich Grammar School and established the law firm, Summerville & Delaney.

On 22 July 1892 he married Annie Agnes Herbert (died 1941) and together had two sons and three daughters. He died in Ipswich in May 1919 and was buried in the Ipswich General Cemetery.

== Public life ==
Summerville was an alderman on the Ipswich City Council and Mayor of the city in 1903. He won the seat of Stanley for Labour in the Queensland Legislative Assembly at the 1902 state election, but was defeated two years later.

== Street name ==
A number of street names in the Brisbane suburb of Carina Heights are identical to the surnames of former Members of the Queensland Legislative Assembly. One of these is Summerville Street.

Parliament of Queensland
Preceded by Frederick Lord	Member for Stanley; 1902–1904	Succeeded by Henry Somerset
