= 2020 Bundamba state by-election =

- 28 March 2020

The district of Bundamba in the Legislative Assembly of Queensland
- Turnout: 66.4% ▼22.7
	First party	Second party
Candidate	Lance McCallum	Sharon Bell
Party	Labor	One Nation
Popular vote	9,134	6,006
Percentage	42.2%	27.7%
Swing	▼11.2	▲27.7
2CP	59.8%	40.2%
2CP swing	▼11.8	▲40.2
	Third party	Fourth party
Candidate	Robert Shearman	Danielle Mutton
Party	Liberal National	Greens
Popular vote	3,589	2,924
Percentage	16.6%	13.5%
Swing	▲1.4	▲2.6
- Map of the Electoral district of Bundamba since the 2017 state election
MP before election
Jo-Ann Miller
Labor
Elected MP
Lance McCallum
Labor

A by-election was held for the seat of Bundamba in the Legislative Assembly of Queensland on 28 March 2020 following the resignation of Jo-Ann Miller on 20 February 2020. The by-election was held on the same day as the Currumbin by-election and the statewide local government elections.

Lance McCallum won the by-election, holding the seat for the Labor Party.

== Key dates ==
Date	Event
24 February 2020	Issue of the writ
28 February 2020	Close of electoral rolls
3 March 2020	Close of nominations
16 March 2020	Early voting begins
28 March 2020	Polling day, between the hours of 8 am and 6 pm

== Candidates ==
Candidates in ballot paper order
One Nation	Sharon Bell	Estimating assistant. Contested Blair at the 2019 federal election.
Labor	Lance McCallum	Former Electrical Trade Union official.
Greens	Danielle Mutton	Union organiser.
Liberal National	Robert Shearman	Retired army serviceman, businessman.

== Opinion polling ==
Bundamba by-election polling
Date	Firm	Commissioned by	Sample	Primary vote					TPP vote
				ALP	ON	LNP	GRN	OTH (Note: Also includes 'Undecided'.)	ALP	ON
22 March 2020	UComms	The Courier Mail	~700	37.6%	21.2%	9.7%	14.4%	17.2%	62%	38%
2017 Queensland state election				53.3%	-	15.2%	10.9%	20.5%	71.6%	28.4% (Note: TPP results in 2017 was between Labor and LNP.)

== Results ==
Bundamba state by-election, 28 March 2020
Party	Candidate	Votes	%	±%
Labor	Lance McCallum	9,134	42.2	−11.2
One Nation	Sharon Bell	6,006	27.7	+27.7
Liberal National	Robert Shearman	3,589	16.6	+1.4
Greens	Danielle Mutton	2,924	13.5	+2.6
Total formal votes		21,653	89.1	−2.6
Informal votes		2,644	10.9	+2.6
Turnout		24,297	66.4	−22.7
Two-candidate-preferred result
Labor	Lance McCallum	12,949	59.8	−11.8
One Nation	Sharon Bell	8,704	40.2	+40.2
Labor hold				
