= Frederick Lord (Queensland politician) =

Australian politician

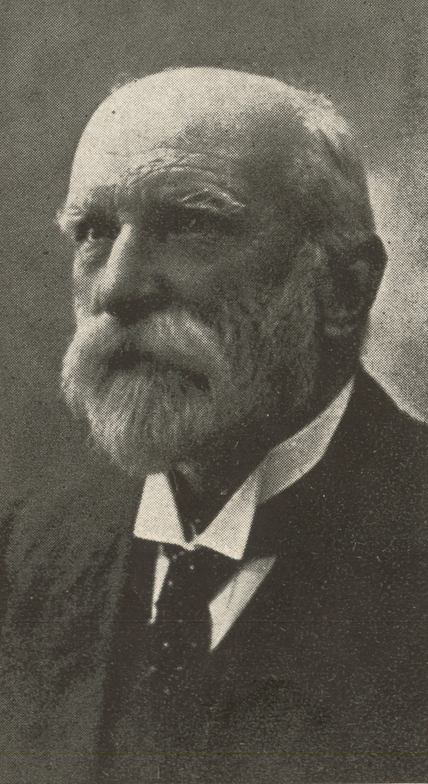

Member of the Queensland Legislative Assembly for Stanley
- In office 29 April 1893 – 11 March 1902
- Preceded by: Patrick O'Sullivan
- Succeeded by: William Summerville

Personal details
- Born: Frederick Lord; 8 November 1841 Avoca, Van Diemen's Land, Australia
- Died: 5 December 1914 (aged 73) Brisbane, Queensland, Australia
- Resting place: Toowong Cemetery
- Party: Ministerialist
- Spouse: Mary Da Costa Warner (m.1868 d.1925)
- Occupation: Engineer

Frederick Lord (8 November 1841 – 5 December 1914) was a member of the Queensland Legislative Assembly.

== Biography ==
Lord was born at Avoca, Van Diemen's Land, the son of Simeon Lord and his wife Sarah (née Birch). He was educated at Blackhealth Proprietary School and King's school in London. He worked as an engineer on the Great Northern Railway in England. After arriving back in Australia he was an engineer on the Central Queensland railway before working as a surveyor on the Darling Downs. He then acquired a series of runs across southern Queensland. Lord was a director of the Queensland National Bank and Moreheads Ltd.

In 1868 Lord married Mary Da Costa Warner (died 1925) and together had two sons and two daughters. He died in Brisbane in December 1914 and was buried in the Toowong Cemetery.

== Public life ==
Lord was a member of the Gympie Mining Court, the Marsupial Board in Esk and chairman of the Esk Division.

At the Queensland colonial elections of 1893, Lord won the seat of Stanley, defeating the sitting member, Patrick O'Sullivan. He held the seat until 1902 when he was defeated by William Summerville.

Parliament of Queensland
Preceded by Patrick O'Sullivan	Member for Stanley; 1893–1902	Succeeded by William Summerville
