= Peter White (Australian politician, born 1824) =

Australian politician

Member of the Queensland Legislative Assembly for Stanley
- In office 23 August 1883 – 23 May 1888 Serving with William Kellett
- Preceded by: Patrick O'Sullivan
- Succeeded by: Patrick O'Sullivan

Personal details
- Born: Peter White; 1824 Otterburn, Northumberland, England
- Died: 4 April 1901 (aged 76 or 77) Laidley, Queensland, Australia
- Spouse(s): 1866 Mary Dixton (m.1866), Sarah Greenwood (m.1890)
- Occupation: Farmer

Peter White (1824 – 4 April 1901) was a politician in Queensland, Australia. He was a Member of the Queensland Legislative Assembly. He was elected as the member of the Electoral district of Stanley on 23 August 1883 and served until 23 May 1888.

== Life ==
Peter White was born on 1824 in Otterburn, Northumberland, England.

== Death ==
He died on 4 April 1901 at his residence, The Willows, in Laidley, Queensland, Australia.

Parliament of Queensland
| Preceded by Patrick O'Sullivan | Member for Stanley; 1883–1888; Served alongside: William Kellett | Succeeded by Patrick O'Sullivan |
