= Jean Isambert =

Australian politician

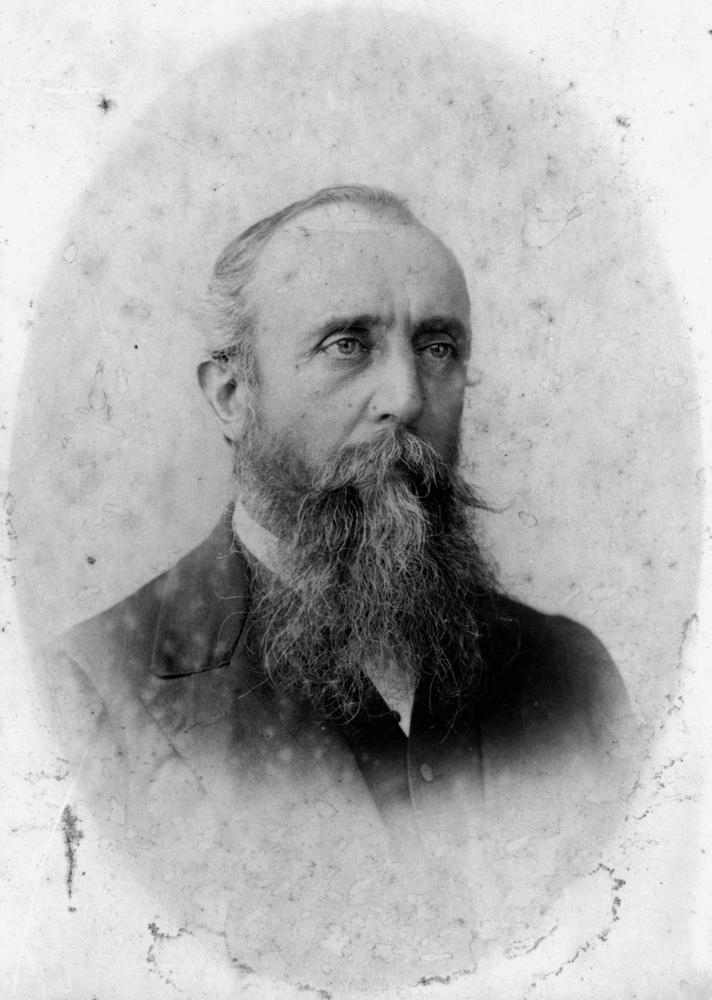
- Jean Isambert - 1889

Member of the Queensland Legislative Assembly for Rosewood
- In office 17 July 1882 – 25 October 1892
- Preceded by: Archibald Meston
- Succeeded by: James Foote

Personal details
- Born: Jean Baptiste Louis Isambert; 1838 Zollhof, Germany
- Died: 22 February 1906 (aged 67-68) Cooktown, Queensland, Australia
- Resting place: Cooktown Cemetery
- Occupation: Newspaper proprietor

Jean Baptiste Louis Isambert (1838 – 22 February 1906) was a member of the Queensland Legislative Assembly.

== Biography ==
Isambert was born at Zollhof, Germany, the son of John Baptiste Louis Isambert Snr and his wife Agnes (née McKanem). He owned a vineyard at Ipswich and was the proprietor of the Nord Australische Zeitung.

He died in February 1906 and was buried in the Cooktown Cemetery.

== Public life ==
Isambert won the by-election for the seat of Rosewood in the Queensland Legislative Assembly in 1882 after the sitting member, Archibald Meston was declared bankrupt. He held the seat for 10 years, resigning in 1892.

Parliament of Queensland
| Preceded by Archibald Meston | Member for Rosewood; 1882–1892 | Succeeded by James Foote |
