= Ernest Hunter =

Australian politician

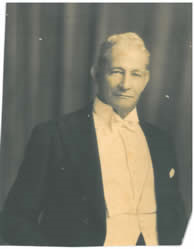

Member of the Queensland Legislative Assembly for Burke
- In office 19 May 1888 – 24 June 1890 Serving with William Hodgkinson
- Preceded by: Edward Palmer
- Succeeded by: John Hoolan

Personal details
- Born: Ernest Charles James Hunter; 17 November 1862 Dumbarton, Scotland
- Died: 14 August 1944 (aged 81) Mareeba, Queensland, Australia
- Resting place: Mareeba Pioneer Cemetery
- Spouse(s): Esther Braithwaite (m.1886 d.1917), Florence Clow Ross (m.1921)
- Relations: Frank Wise (son-in-law)
- Occupation: Sharebroker, Publican

Ernest Charles James Hunter (17 November 1862 – 14 August 1944) was a sharebroker and member of the Queensland Legislative Assembly.

== Early days ==
Hunter was born and educated at Dumbarton, Scotland to James Hunter and his wife Cecilia Ann (née Burgess). He arrived in Rockhampton in 1871 and then in Maryborough where he worked as a printer for the Wide Bay News before heading for the gold fields of Gympie, Charters Towers, Croydon, and Etheridge.

By 1883, Hunter was working as a sharebroker in Charters Towers and from 1886–1888 carried on his trade in Brisbane.

== Political career ==
Hunter was elected to the Queensland Legislative Assembly as the member for Burke in 1888 but was declared insolvent in 1890 and forfeited his seat.

After he left politics, Hunter established a fruit pulp and molasses business in Cairns where he was also at one time a publican and auctioneer. In 1929 he travelled to London to float Cape York mines.

== Personal life ==
On the 27 Nov 1886, Hunter married Esther Braithwaite and together had 3 sons and 1 daughter. Esther died in 1917 and on the 24 Mar 1921 Hunter married Florence Clow Ross and together had 2 sons. His daughter, Elsie Dorothy Hunter, married future Premier of Western Australia Frank Wise in 1922.

Hunter died at the Mareeba District Hospital in 1944. His funeral moved from St George's Church of England to the Mareeba Pioneer Cemetery.

== See also ==
- Members of the Queensland Legislative Assembly, 1888–1893

Parliament of Queensland
Preceded by Edward Palmer	Member for Burke; 1888–1890; Served alongside: William Hodgkinson	Succeeded by John Hoolan
