= James Foote =

Australian politician

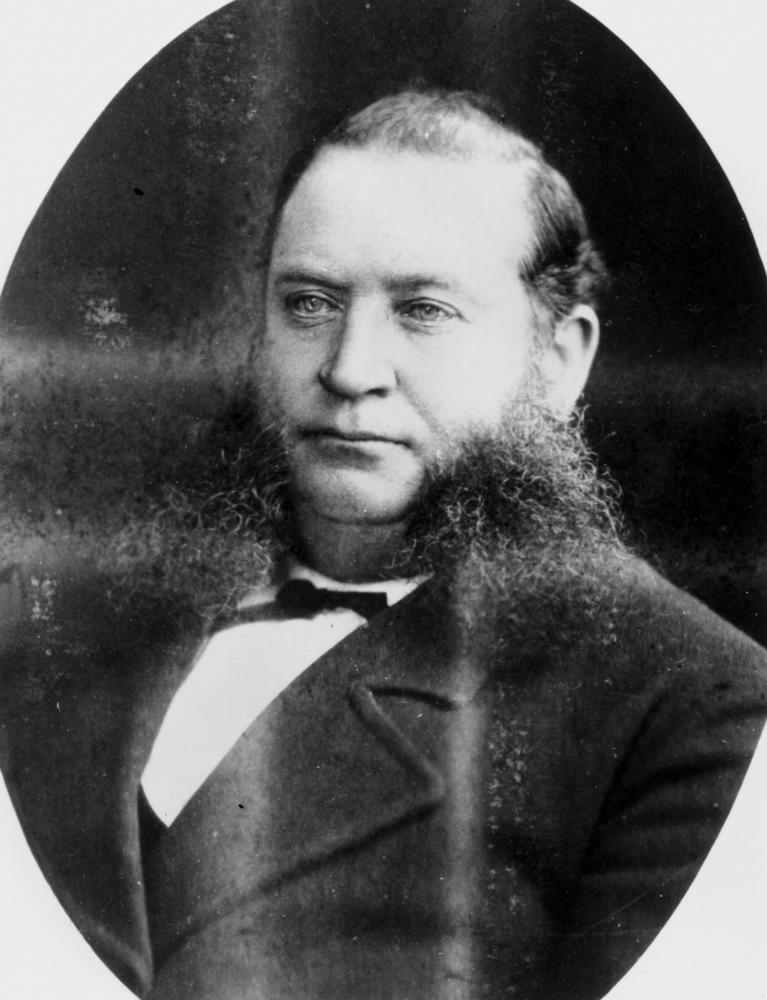
- James Foote, circa 1880

Member of the Queensland Legislative Assembly for West Moreton
- In office 18 November 1873 – 26 November 1878
- Preceded by: New seat
- Succeeded by: Seat abolished

Member of the Queensland Legislative Assembly for Bundamba
- In office 12 November 1880 – 12 May 1888
- Preceded by: William Hendren
- Succeeded by: Thomas Glassey

Member of the Queensland Legislative Assembly for Rosewood
- In office 15 November 1892 – 6 May 1893
- Preceded by: Jean Isambert
- Succeeded by: James Cribb

Personal details
- Born: James Foote; 2 March 1829 Frampton Cotterell, Gloucestershire, England
- Died: 4 September 1895 (aged 44) Ipswich, Queensland, Australia
- Resting place: Ipswich General Cemetery
- Spouse: Catherine Keith (née Cramb)
- Occupation: Grocery store owner

James Foote (1829–1895) was a British-born politician in Queensland, Australia. He was a Member of the Queensland Legislative Assembly and a mayor of the Borough of Ipswich.

== Early life ==
James Foote was born on 2 March 1829 in England, in either Frampton Cotterell, Gloucestershire or in Calne, Wiltshire, the son of Joseph Foote (a hat maker) and his wife Elizabeth (née Clarke). In January 1848, his father emigrated to Van Diemen's Land (Tasmania) as an agent of the Van Dieman's Land Colonial Mission Society and was appointed the resident Independent minister at Richmond within a few weeks of his arrival. On 10 September 1848 Joseph died after being seized with an apoplectic fit while preaching the divine service.

He immigrated with his mother, three sisters, his brother John Clarke Foote and his sister-in-law on the Emigrant, arriving in Moreton Bay on 12 August 1850. During the voyage, there was an outbreak of typhus and around 20 people died. The ship on arrival in Moreton Bay was placed under quarantine, and was not brought into Brisbane until 28 September 1850.

On 21 July 1863, James Foote married Catherine Keith (née Cramb), the widow of James Keith, at Clydebank Cottage, Petrie Terrace, Brisbane.

After some time, he established a grocery business in Ipswich to which he later added ironmongery.

== Politics ==
Foote was an alderman of Borough of Ipswich in 1866–1869 and 1871 and was mayor of Ipswich in 1870.

Foote was elected to the Queensland Legislative Assembly in the electoral district of West Moreton in the 1873 Queensland colonial election on 18 November 1873. He held the seat until the 1878 election on 15 November 1878.

On 21 January 1879, following the defeat of the Douglas Ministry, the McIlwraith Ministry was sworn in. The Constitution required all of them to stand down and contest their parliamentary seats at ministerial by-elections. Only one of its members was opposed at election: John Malbon Thompson, the member for Ipswich, who was returned by a narrow majority at the poll on 1 February 1879 against Foote.

On 26 October 1880, William Hendren, the member for Bundamba, resigned following his being declared insolvent. Foote won the resulting by-election on 12 November 1880. He held the seat until 12 May 1888. He was nominated as a candidate for Bundamba in the 1888 election. However, on 13 March 1888, he broke his leg when he stood up in his buggy and the horse suddenly moved forward, throwing him backwards, and after a few weeks decided to withdraw from the contest due to the injury.

On 15 October 1892, Jean-Baptiste Isambert, the member for Rosewood, resigned following his being adjudicated as insolvent. Foote won the resulting by-election on 15 November 1892 and held the seat until the 1893 election on 6 May 1893.

== Later life ==
James Foote died on 4 September 1895 at his residence in Ipswich; he had been ill for some months prior to his death. His funeral service the following day was an "imposing spectacle". The Old Ipswich Town Hall had its flag at half-mast, many businesses with which Foote was associated closed for the day, and there was a large funeral cortege. Led by the Baptist pastor, Rev. Young, the hearse was followed by all of Foote's employees walking, Foote's favourite buggy bearing a pet dog, then 60 to 70 vehicles and a considerable number of horsemen, while many citizens lined the route to the Ipswich General Cemetery, where a graveside service was conducted.

== See also ==
- Members of the Queensland Legislative Assembly, 1873–1878; 1878–1883; 1883–1888; 1888–1893

Political offices
Parliament of Queensland
New seat	Member for West Moreton; 1873–1878	Abolished
Preceded by William Hendren	Member for Bundamba; 1880–1888	Succeeded by Thomas Glassey
Preceded by Jean Isambert	Member for Rosewood; 1892–1893	Succeeded by James Cribb
