= Albert Callan =

Australian politician

The Hon Albert Callan
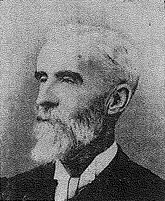

Member of the Queensland Legislative Assembly for Fitzroy
- In office 3 August 1889 – 11 March 1902
- Preceded by: Robert Lyons
- Succeeded by: Henri Cowap

Queensland Legislative Council
- In office 5 July 1902 – 9 May 1912

Personal details
- Born: Albert James Callan; December 1839 Dublin, Ireland
- Died: 9 May 1912 (aged 72) New Farm, Queensland, Australia
- Resting place: Toowong Cemetery
- Party: Ministerial
- Spouse: Ellen Milford (m.1870 d.1910)
- Occupation: Company director

Albert James Callan (December 1839 – 9 May 1912) was a Company director, and a member of both the Queensland Legislative Council and Queensland Legislative Assembly.

== Early life ==
Callan was born in Dublin, Ireland to John Bartholomew Callan and his wife Isabella (née Duthie) and educated at Jesuit's College, Dublin.

== Political career ==
Following the resignation of Robert Lyons, he entered state politics in 1889, winning a by-election for the seat of Fitzroy. Callan held the seat until the 1902 state election which he did not contest.

Callan was then appointed to the Queensland Legislative Council in July 1902, remaining a member till his death ten years later.

== Personal life ==
Callan married Ellen Milford in 1870, and together had four children. He was a director of Walter Reid & Co., Mt Morgan Gold Mining Co., and the National Bank.

He died in May 1912 and was buried in Toowong Cemetery.
