= Kenneth Grant (politician) =

Australian politician

The Honourable Ken Grant
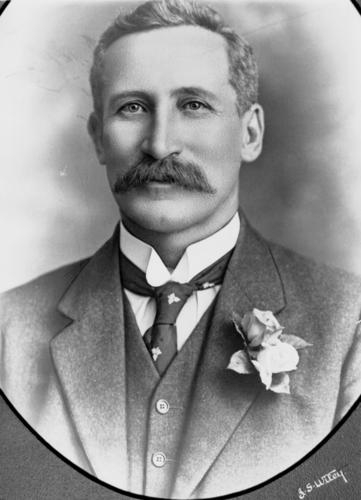
- Ken Grant - 1915

Member of the Queensland Legislative Assembly for Rockhampton
- In office 11 March 1902 – 27 April 1912 Serving with William Kidston, John Adamson
- Preceded by: George Curtis
- Succeeded by: Seat abolished

Member of the Queensland Legislative Assembly for Fitzroy
- In office 27 April 1912 – 22 May 1915
- Preceded by: James Crawford
- Succeeded by: Harold Hartley

Personal details
- Born: Kenneth Macdonald Grant; September 1866 Geelong, Victoria, Australia
- Died: 13 August 1922 (aged 55) Albion, Queensland, Australia
- Resting place: Toowong Cemetery
- Party: Kidstonites
- Other political affiliations: Labour
- Occupation: Telegraphist

Kenneth Macdonald Grant (September 1866 – 13 August 1922) was a telegraphist and member of the Queensland Legislative Assembly in Australia.

== Biography ==
Grant was born in Geelong, Victoria, to parents William Grant and his wife Jessie (née McDonald) and attended Brisbane Normal School. He began his working life as a cadet in the Post and Telegraphs Department and became a telegraphist at the Rockhampton Post Office and Railway Traffic Office. Later on he was a director of the Blair Athol Land and Timber Co. and the principal of K.M. Grant and Co. Ltd.

In his younger days he was a keen sportsman and president of the Central Queensland Rugby League, and a patron of the Rockhampton Jockey Club and the Rockhampton Bowls Club.

Unmarried, he died from the complications of an attack of influenza in August 1922. His funeral proceeded from has Albion home to the Toowong Cemetery.

== Political career ==
Grant represented the state seat of Rockhampton from 1902 until 1912. He then switched to the seat of Fitzroy in 1912 but was defeated by Harold Hartley in 1915. He started out representing the Labour Party but by the end of his political career he was a member of the Kidstonites.

He was the Chairman of Committees in 1910, Acting Secretary for Public Instruction in 1911–1912, and Home Secretary and Secretary for Mines in 1915.

Parliament of Queensland
Preceded by George Curtis	Member for Rockhampton; 1902–1912; Served alongside: William Kidston, John Adamson	Abolished
Preceded by James Crawford	Member for Fitzroy; 1912–1915	Succeeded by Harold Hartley
