= Henri Cowap =

Australian politician (1861–1930)

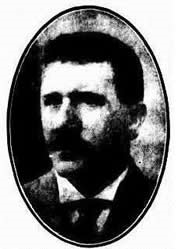

Member of the Queensland Legislative Assembly for Fitzroy
- In office 11 March 1902 – 2 October 1909
- Preceded by: Albert Callan
- Succeeded by: James Crawford

Personal details
- Born: Henri Cowap; 1861 Chester, England
- Died: 21 October 1930 (aged 69) Brisbane, Queensland, Australia
- Resting place: Lutwyche Cemetery
- Party: Kidstonites
- Other political affiliations: Labour, Opposition
- Spouse: Mary Jane West (m.1886 d.1947)
- Occupation: Plumber

Henri Cowap (1861 – 21 October 1930) was an Australian politician and plumber who served as a member of the Queensland Legislative Assembly from 1902 to 1909.

He was born in Chester, England, to parents William Cowap and his wife Emma (née Latham) and attended school while still in Chester. He arrived in Queensland in 1882 where he became an apprentice plumber and by 1888 was working in Mt Morgan, He later worked as a shops and factories inspector.

On his retirement from public life he devoted himself to friendly societies and was a member of the Manchester Unity Independent Order of Oddfellows. He was also a member of the member and secretary of 763 Masonic Lodge, Scotch Constitution.

On 29 May 1886 he married Mary Jane West (died 1947) and together had two daughters. He died in Brisbane in October 1930 and his funeral proceeded from his Wooloowin residence to the Lutwyche Cemetery.

== Political career ==
Muller represented the state seat of Fitzroy from 1902 until 1909. He started out representing the Labour Party but by the end of his political career he was a member of the Kidstonites.

Parliament of Queensland
| Preceded by Albert Callan | Member for Fitzroy; 1902–1909 | Succeeded by James Crawford |
