= John Pettigrew (politician) =

Australian politician

The Hon John Pettigrew
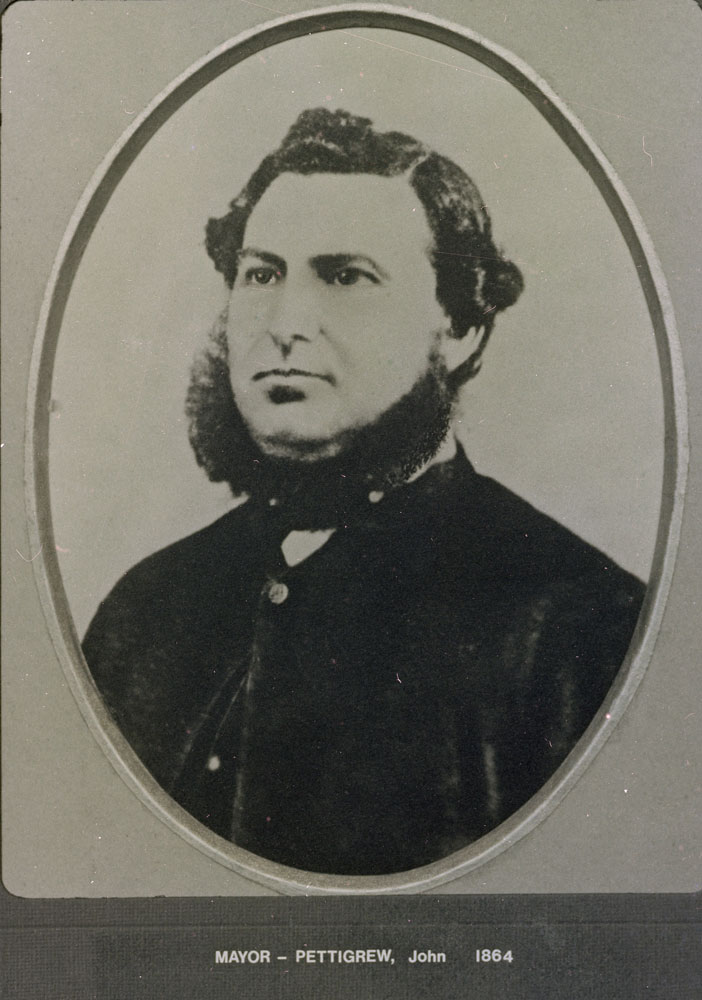
- John Pettigrew, Ipswich, 1864

Member of the Queensland Legislative Assembly
- In office 20 November 1873 – 10 December 1878

Personal details
- Born: John Pettigrew; 1832 Tarshaw, Scotland
- Died: 18 November 1878 (aged 45–46) Ipswich, Queensland, Australia
- Spouse: Elizabeth Twine (m.1854, d.1868) Grace Marcella Boyd (m. 1868)
- Relations: William Pettigrew (brother)
- Occupation: Storekeeper

John Pettigrew (1832 – 18 November 1878) was a politician in Queensland, Australia. He was a member of the Queensland Legislative Assembly. and represented the Electoral District of Stanley from 20 November 1873 until 10 December 1878.

== Early life ==
John Pettigrew was born in 1832 at Tarshaw, Burton, Ayrshire, Scotland. His parents were Robert Pettigrew and Mary (née McWhinnie). His brother was William Pettigrew, who was a member of the Queensland Legislative Council and mayor of Brisbane. John was educated at the Ayr Academy, Scotland and emigrated to Australia in 1850.

After initially living in Melbourne John Pettigrew moved to Ipswich, Queensland in 1852 and was one Ipswich's first general storekeepers. He was a strong supporter of Moreton Bay Colony separating from New South Wales with his being the first signature to appear on the petition to the Governor of New South Wales.

== Political life ==
Pettigrew was an alderman of Ipswich City Council in 1860–61; 1863–64; and 1866. He also served as mayor of Ipswich in 1864

He later became a member of the Queensland Legislative Assembly from 1873 to 1878.

== Later life ==
In 1854, John married Elizabeth Ann Twine and they had five children before Elizabeth died in 1868. Surviving children included:

- Robert Pettigrew (b. 1856)
- Elizabeth Heys Pettigrew (b. 1859)
- Annie Mary Pettigrew (b. 1864)
- William Pettigrew (b. 1866).

In 1868 John married Grace Marcella Boyd and they had four children. Surviving children included:

- James Pettigrew (b. 1870)
- William Pettigrew (b. 1874)
- Henry Pettigrew (b. 1877).

John Pettigrew died on 18 November 1878 and is buried in the Ipswich General Cemetery.
