= Lance McCallum =

Australian politician

The Honourable Lance McCallum MP

Member of the Queensland Legislative Assembly for Bundamba
- Incumbent
- Assumed office 28 March 2020
- Preceded by: Jo-Ann Miller

Personal details
- Party: Labor
- Occupation: Trade union official
- Website: www.lancemccallum.com.au

Lance Richard McCallum is an Australian politician. He has been a Labor member of the Queensland Legislative Assembly since 2020, when he was elected to represent Bundamba in a by-election following the resignation of Jo-Ann Miller.

He worked as an official for the Electrical Trades Union, and in 2019 was appointed by the Queensland Government as director of the Just Transition Group.

Parliament of Queensland
Preceded by Jo-Ann Miller	Member for Bundamba; 2020–present	Incumbent
