= Patrick O'Sullivan (Queensland politician) =

Australian politician (1818–1904)

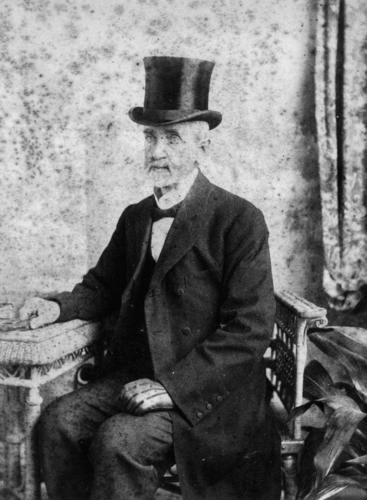

Member of the Queensland Legislative Assembly for Ipswich
- In office 10 May 1860 – 30 May 1863 Serving with Frederick Forbes, Arthur Macalister
- Preceded by: New seat
- Succeeded by: Henry Challinor

Member of the Queensland Legislative Assembly for West Moreton
- In office 2 July 1867 – 28 September 1868 Serving with George Thorn, Jr., Joshua Peter Bell
- Preceded by: Benjamin Cribb
- Succeeded by: Samuel Hodgson

Member of the Queensland Legislative Assembly for Burke
- In office 22 August 1876 – 14 November 1878
- Preceded by: James Parker
- Succeeded by: Roger Sheaffe

Member of the Queensland Legislative Assembly for Stanley
- In office 10 December 1878 – 23 August 1883 Serving with William Kellett
- Preceded by: John Pettigrew
- Succeeded by: Peter White
- In office 23 May 1888 – 29 April 1893
- Preceded by: Peter White
- Succeeded by: Frederick Lord

Personal details
- Born: Patrick O'Sullivan; 14 March 1818 Castlemaine, County Kerry, Ireland
- Died: 29 February 1904 (aged 85) Ipswich, Queensland, Australia
- Resting place: Ipswich General Cemetery
- Spouse: Mary Real (m. 1851–1925)
- Relations: Neil O'Sullivan (grandson)
- Children: Thomas O'Sullivan
- Occupation: Shop keeper

Patrick O'Sullivan (14 March 1818 – 29 February 1904) was an Australian politician who served as a member of the Queensland Legislative Assembly.

== Biography ==
O'Sullivan was born on 14 March 1818, in Castlemaine, to soldier William and Ellen O'Sullivan (née Moriarty). O'Sullivan was also a soldier, and was stationed in London with his regiment when Queen Victoria succeeded to the throne in 1837. In January 1838, however, he was sentenced to fifteen years transportation for assault, thus missing the coronation by several months. He arrived at Sydney on 21 July 1838, sailing to Australia on the Bengal Merchant and went to work at Illawarra.

He was given a ticket-of-leave in 1845 for the Windsor District and later that year began hawking before settling in Ipswich in 1847. He became a store-keeper in Ipswich and received a conditional pardon on 20 October 1849, eventually becoming a successful merchant.

On 7 May 1851, he married Mary Real (died 1925) and together had seven sons and six daughters. O'Sullivan died of a stroke at his Woodend home and was buried in the Ipswich General Cemetery.

== Public career ==
O'Sullivan, along with Frederick Forbes and three time premier of Queensland, Arthur Macalister, won the three positions for the electoral district of Ipswich at the inaugural 1860 Queensland election. O'Sullivan was defeated at the 1863 election and four years later won a position on the electoral district of West Moreton, also a three-member seat. He remained the member for just over a year, being defeated at the 1868 Queensland election.

He was then out of politics until 1876 when, following the resignation of James Parker, he won the seat of Burke at the 1876 by-election. He did not stand for re-election for Burke and instead won the seat of Stanley in 1878 before being defeated in 1883. He won the seat of Stanley again at the 1888 Queensland colonial election before retiring from politics in 1893. He died on 29 February 1904, aged 85, in Ipswich, and is interred at Ipswich General Cemetery.

His son, Thomas O'Sullivan, was a member of the Queensland Legislative Council and his grandson, Neil O'Sullivan, was a senator in the federal parliament.

Parliament of Queensland
New seat	Member for Ipswich; 1860–1863; Served alongside: Frederick Forbes, Arthur Macalister	Succeeded by Henry Challinor
Preceded by Benjamin Cribb	Member for West Moreton; 1867–1868; Served alongside: George Thorn, Jr., Joshua Peter Bell	Succeeded by Samuel Hodgson
Preceded by James Parker	Member for Burke; 1876–1878	Succeeded by Roger Sheaffe
Preceded by John Pettigrew	Member for Stanley; 1878–1883; Served alongside: William Kellett	Succeeded by Peter White
Preceded by Peter White	Member for Stanley; 1888–1893	Succeeded by Frederick Lord
