= James Crawford (Australian politician) =

Australian politician

Member of the Queensland Legislative Assembly for Fitzroy
- In office 2 October 1909 – 27 April 1912
- Preceded by: Henri Cowap
- Succeeded by: Kenneth Grant

Member of the Queensland Legislative Assembly for Mount Morgan
- In office 27 April 1912 – 22 May 1915
- Preceded by: New seat
- Succeeded by: James Stopford

Personal details
- Born: James Crawford; 4 March 1870 Woonona, New South Wales, Australia
- Died: 28 December 1916 (aged 46) Clermont, Queensland, Australia
- Party: Ministerial
- Other political affiliations: Labour
- Spouse: Myra Clarke (m.1905)
- Relations: Thomas Crawford (brother); Max Crawford (nephew); John Crawford (nephew)
- Occupation: Barrister

James Crawford (4 March 1870 – 28 December 1916) was a barrister and member of the Queensland Legislative Assembly.

== Early life ==
Crawford was born in Woonona, New South Wales, to parents James Crawford and his wife Ellen (née Simpson) and attended school while still in Woonona. He was a coalminer in Wollongong in 1883 and by 1888 he was in Narrandera working for the railways. He became a barrister and solicitor working out of Clermont.

When working in the mines he became involved in the labour movement, becoming vice-president of the Australian Workers' Association in Cobar, New South Wales, and secretary of the Fitzroy Miners' Union. He was a member of the Royal Commission into the Mount Morgan disaster in 1908.

== Political career ==
Crawford represented the state seat of Fitzroy from 1909 until 1912. He then represented the new seat of Mount Morgan in 1912 but was defeated by James Stopford in 1915. He started out representing the Labour Party but by the end of his political career he was a member of the Ministerialists.

== Personal life ==
In 1905 Crawford married Myra Clarke but it is not recorded if they had any children. He drowned in the catastrophic floods that hit Clermont in December 1916.

Crawford's younger brother Thomas Simpson Crawford was a state MP in New South Wales. His nephews included economist John Crawford and historian Max Crawford.

Parliament of Queensland
Preceded by Henri Cowap	Member for Fitzroy; 1909–1912	Succeeded by Kenneth Grant
New seat	Member for Mount Morgan; 1912–1915	Succeeded by James Stopford
