= William Carter (Queensland politician) =

Australian politician

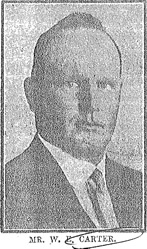

Member of the Queensland Legislative Assembly for Fitzroy
- In office 11 May 1929 – 11 Jun 1932
- Preceded by: Harold Hartley
- Succeeded by: Jens Peterson

Personal details
- Born: William Edward Carter; 28 February 1900 Mount Morgan, Queensland, Australia
- Died: 24 August 1969 (aged 69) Rosalie, Queensland, Australia
- Resting place: Pinnaroo Lawn Cemetery
- Party: CPNP
- Spouse: Margaret McNae (m. 1927)
- Occupation: Publican

William Edward Carter (28 February 1900 – 24 August 1969), known as Ted Carter, was a publican and member of the Queensland Legislative Assembly.

== Biography ==
Carter was born in 1900 in Mount Morgan, Queensland, to parents Joseph Frederick Carter and his wife Clara Jane (née Vickers). He attended state schools in Mount Morgan and Red Hill and, from 1916 until he entered politics, he worked for Queensland Rail. Carter married Margaret McNae on 9 March 1927.

Carter won the state seat of Fitzroy in 1929 for the CPNP. He did not contest the seat in the 1932 Queensland state election.

After his retirement from politics, Carter managed a hotel in Sydney from 1941 until 1967. He died in Rosalie, Queensland in 1969 and was buried at Pinnaroo Lawn Cemetery, Brisbane.

Parliament of Queensland
Preceded by Harold Hartley	Member for Fitzroy; 1929–1932	Succeeded by Jens Peterson
