= Jens Peterson =

Australian politician (1880–1953)

Jens Petersen
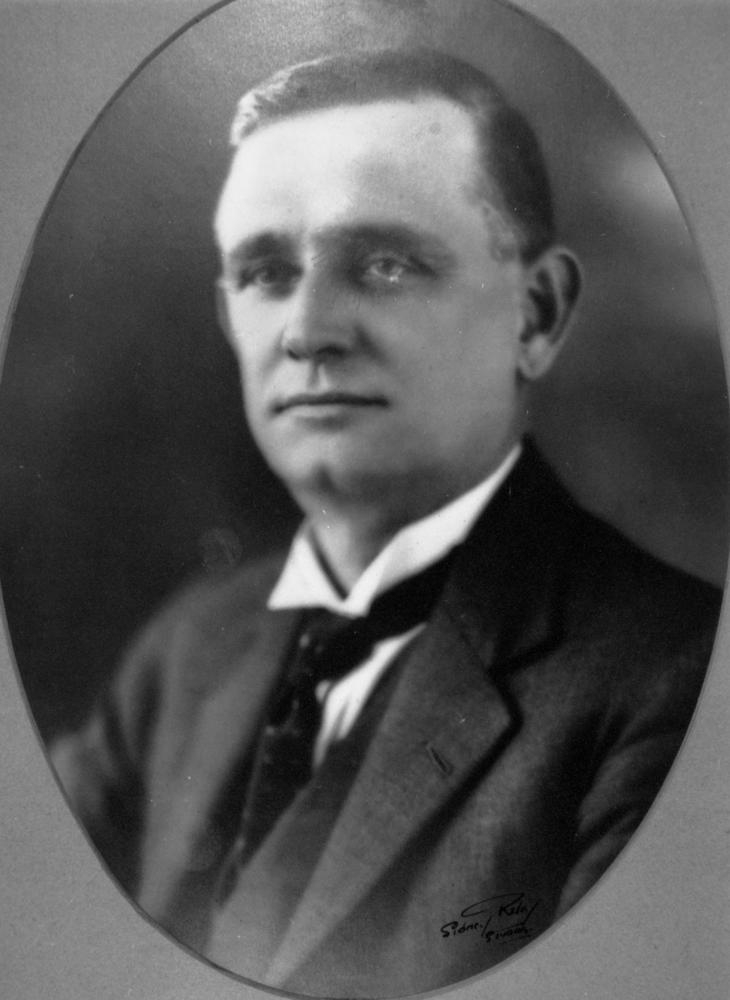
- Jens Petersen - 1929

Member of the Queensland Legislative Assembly for Normanby
- In office 22 May 1915 – 11 Jun 1932
- Preceded by: Edward Archer
- Succeeded by: Tom Foley

Member of the Queensland Legislative Assembly for Fitzroy
- In office 11 Jun 1932 – 11 May 1935
- Preceded by: William Carter
- Succeeded by: Jim Clark

Personal details
- Born: James Christian Petersen; 11 December 1880 Rockhampton, Queensland, Australia
- Died: 30 April 1953 (aged 72) Sydney, New South Wales, Australia
- Resting place: Frenchs Forest Cemetery
- Party: CPNP
- Other party: Labor Party, Queensland United Party, Country Party
- Spouse: Cordelia May Dawbarn (m.1905 d.1946)
- Occupation: Builder

James Christian "Jens" Petersen (11 December 1880 – 30 April 1953) was a builder and member of the Queensland Legislative Assembly.

== Biography ==
Petersen was born in Rockhampton, Queensland, to parents Neils Petersen and his wife Maria Elizabeth (née Thorsen). He attended school in Rockhampton and became a builder, working in Rockhampton, Mount Morgan, and Sydney. He was secretary of the Rockhampton Workers Political Organisation in 1898.

In 1905 he married Cordelia May Dawbarn in Sydney and together had two daughters. He died in Sydney in April 1953 and was buried in Frenchs Forest Cemetery.

== Political career ==
Petersen, at first representing the Labor Party, won the Queensland seat of Normanby at the state election of 1915, defeating the Liberal's Edward Archer. He held the seat until 1932 when he changed to Fitzroy and then retired from politics three years later.

He resigned from the Labor Party while still an elected member for the seat of Normanby and joined the Country Party because he was disillusioned with Labor's socialist policies. In his resignation speech he blamed the government for maladministration, the crippling of industry, the restriction of development and the creation of financial stringency and unemployment because of legislative measures.

Petersen's defection came at a crucial time for the Government as at the time there was a serious outbreak of influenza leaving the Government with a one-seat majority. Subsequently, Premier Theodore ordered two of the ALP's strongest members to bring a very sick Labor member into the chamber on a stretcher and transport him across from one side of the House to the other during the remaining divisions. He also introduced proxy voting whereby an ill, absent member's vote could be counted.

From 1929 until 1932 Petersen, by now a member of the governing Country and Progressive National Party, was the Home Secretary.

Parliament of Queensland
Preceded by Edward Archer	Member for Normanby; 1915–1932	Succeeded by Tom Foley
Preceded by William Carter	Member for Fitzroy; 1932–1935	Succeeded by Jim Clark
