= John Hoolan =

Australian politician

Member of the Queensland Legislative Assembly for Burke
- In office 4 April 1896 – 18 March 1899
- Preceded by: Thomas Glassey
- Succeeded by: William Maxwell
- In office 9 August 1890 – 16 June 1894 Serving with William Hodgkinson
- Preceded by: Ernest Hunter
- Succeeded by: Thomas Glassey

Personal details
- Born: John Hoolan; 1842 County Tipperary, Ireland
- Died: 1911 (aged 68–69) Diamantina, Queensland, Australia
- Resting place: Toowong Cemetery
- Party: Labour
- Spouse: Ellen Lawlor (m. 1871–1911)
- Occupation: Journalist, Carpenter, Gold Miner

John Hoolan (1842 – 15 June 1911) was an Australian politician. He was the Labour member for Burke in the Legislative Assembly of Queensland from 1890 to 1894 and from 1896 to 1899.

He was also leader of the Labour Party in Queensland between 1893 and 1894.

Hoolan died in 1911 and was buried in Toowong Cemetery.

Parliament of Queensland
Preceded by Ernest Hunter	Member for Burke; 1890–1894; Served alongside: William Hodgkinson	Succeeded by Thomas Glassey
Preceded by Thomas Glassey	Member for Burke; 1896–1899	Succeeded by William Maxwell
