= Jim Clark (Australian politician) =

Australian miner and politician

Member of the Queensland Legislative Assembly for Fitzroy
- In office 11 May 1935 – 28 May 1960
- Preceded by: Jens Peterson
- Succeeded by: Seat abolished

Personal details
- Born: James Clark; 5 February 1891 Gympie, Queensland, Australia
- Died: 22 November 1963 (aged 72) Brisbane, Queensland, Australia
- Party: Labor
- Spouse: Eileen Russell (m.1919 d.1975)
- Occupation: Union organiser, Miner

James Clark (5 February 1891 – 22 November 1963) was a miner and member of the Queensland Legislative Assembly.

== Biography ==
Clark was born in Gympie, Queensland, to parents James Clark and his wife Marion Cathie Clark (née White). He worked as a miner and in 1926 he became an organiser with the Australian Workers' Union.

On 30 Jun 1919 he married Eileen Russell (died 1975) and together had two sons. He died in November 1963 and was cremated at Mount Thompson Crematorium. He was a member Ancient Order of Druids.

== Political career ==
Clark, representing the Labor, was the member for Fitzroy from 1935 until the seat was abolished in 1960. During that time he was the Chairman of Committees from 1953 until 1957. He was also secretary of the Mount Morgan Hospital.

Parliament of Queensland
Preceded by Jens Peterson	Member for Fitzroy; 1935–1960	Abolished
