= Thomas Nevitt =

Australian politician

The Hon Thomas Nevitt
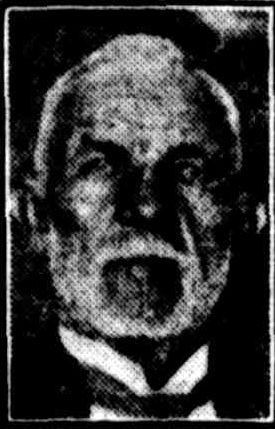
- Thomas Nevitt, March 1932

Member of the Queensland Legislative Assembly for Carpentaria
- In office 18 May 1907 – 27 April 1912
- Preceded by: James Forsyth
- Succeeded by: Seat abolished

Member of the Queensland Legislative Council
- In office 12 October 1917 – 23 March 1922

Personal details
- Born: Thomas Nevitt; May 1864 Crewe, Cheshire, England
- Died: 13 September 1932 (aged 68) Cairns, Queensland, Australia
- Resting place: Martyn St Cemetery
- Party: Labor
- Spouse: Sabina Naughton (m.1887 d.1934)
- Occupation: Wardsman, overseer, visiting justice

Thomas Nevitt (May 1864 – 13 September 1932) was a member of both the Queensland Legislative Council and Queensland Legislative Assembly.

Nevitt was born at Crewe, Cheshire, to James Nevitt and his wife Ellen (née Warburton) and was educated in Crewe Green and St. Paul's Church schools, Crewe. He began his working life as a railway fitter in England before moving to Queensland around 1884. He worked as a hospital wardsman in Normanton for twenty years from 1887, was overseer, Townsville Quarantine Station from 1912 until 1917, and Visiting Justice at St Helena Prison and other centres throughout the state from 1923 to 1930.

== Political career ==
Nevitt entered the Queensland Parliament at the 1907 state election. Standing as the Labour candidate for the seat of Carpentaria, he defeated the sitting member, James Forsyth. He held the seat for five years until it was abolished in 1912.

When the Labour Party starting forming governments in Queensland, it found much of its legislation being blocked by a hostile Council, where members had been appointed for life by successive conservative governments. After a failed referendum in May 1917, Premier Ryan tried a new tactic, and later that year advised the Governor, Sir Hamilton John Goold-Adams, to appoint thirteen new members whose allegiance lay with Labour to the council.

Nevitt was one of the thirteen new members, and went on to serve for four and a half years until the council was abolished in March 1922. From 17 November 1920 he was also the Chairman of Committees.

== Personal life ==
Nevitt married Sabina Naughton in 1887 and together had 3 sons. He retired in March 1932. About July 1932, he travelled to Cairns where he died in a private hospital in September 1932. His funeral was held at St John's Church, Cairns and proceeded to the Martyn St Cemetery.

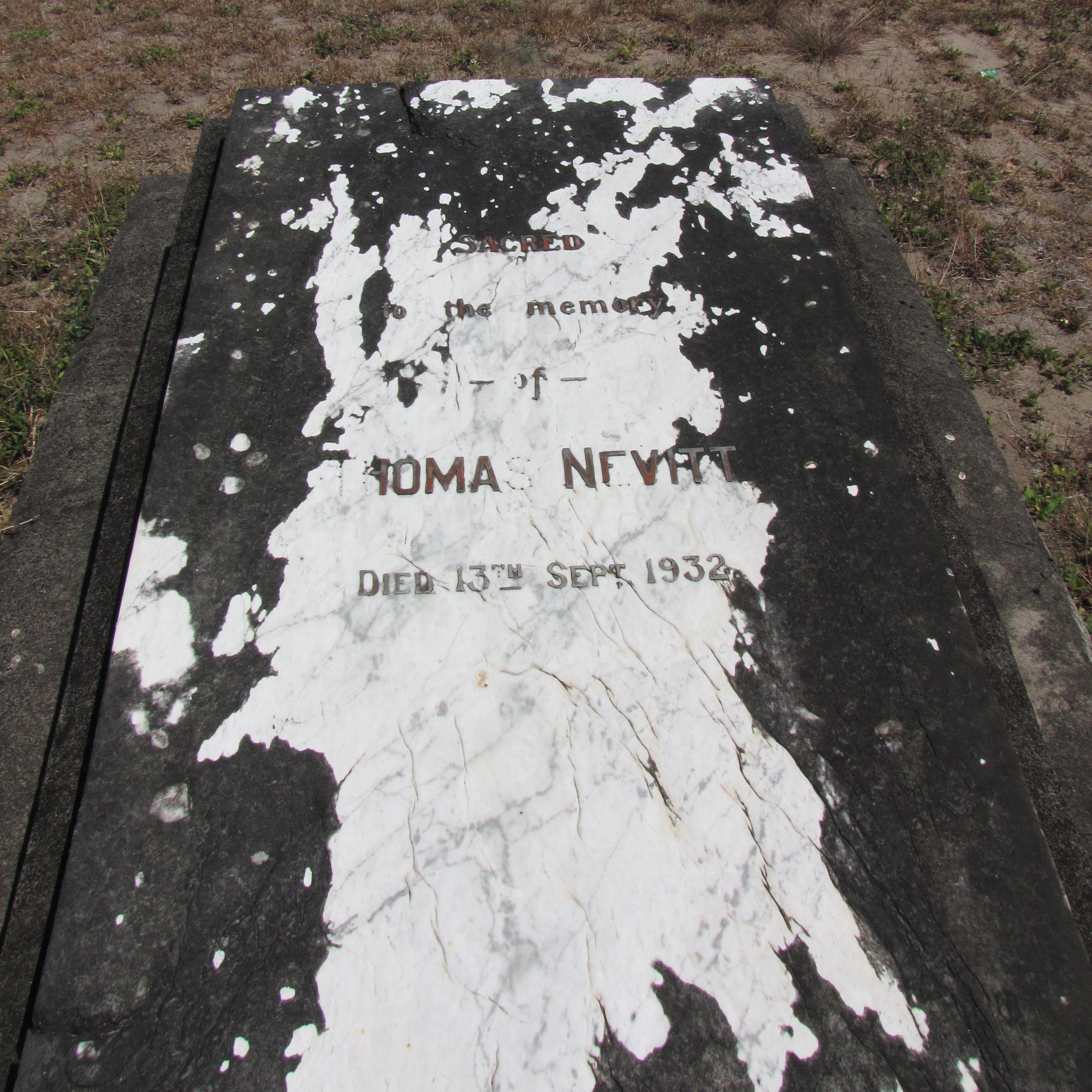
Grave of Thomas Nevitt in Cairns Martyn Street Cemetery

Parliament of Queensland
Preceded by James Forsyth	Member for Carpentaria; 1907–1912	Abolished
