= James Augustus Parker =

Australian politician

James Parker

Member of the Queensland Legislative Assembly for Burke
- In office 26 October 1875 – 21 June 1876
- Preceded by: William Hodgkinson
- Succeeded by: Patrick O'Sullivan

Personal details
- Born: James Augustus Parker c. 1820
- Died: 7 January 1899 (aged 78 or 79) Jembaicumbene, New South Wales, Australia
- Resting place: Braidwood General Cemetery
- Occupation: Crushing mill operator, Miner and mill proprietor

James Augustus Parker (c. 1820 – 7 January 1899) was a miner, mill proprietor, and member of the Queensland Legislative Assembly.

Parker was born around 1820 to parents John Parker and his wife Rebecca.

When the member for the Queensland state seat of Burke, William Hodgkinson, resigned in 1875 to head up a government expedition, Parker won the subsequent by-election unopposed. Parker himself went on to resign the seat in June of the following year.

He died at Jembaicumbene, New South Wales in 1899 and was buried in the Braidwood General Cemetery.

Parliament of Queensland
| Preceded by William Hodgkinson | Member for Burke; 1875–1876 | Succeeded by Patrick O'Sullivan |
