= William Maxwell (Australian politician) =

Australian politician

Member of the Queensland Legislative Assembly for Burke
- In office 18 March 1899 – 2 October 1909
- Preceded by: John Hoolan
- Succeeded by: Charles Collins

Personal details
- Born: William Maxwell; 1867 Wairoa, New Zealand
- Died: 23 April 1921 (aged 53 or 54) Brisbane, Queensland, Australia
- Resting place: Nundah Cemetery
- Party: Kidstonites
- Other political affiliations: Opposition Party, Labour Party
- Spouse(s): Alice Bending (m.1892 d.1893), Mary Elizabeth Steele (m.1895 d.1962)
- Occupation: Gold miner

William Maxwell (1867 – 23 April 1921) was a gold miner and member of the Queensland Legislative Assembly.

== Early days ==
Maxwell was born at Wairoa, New Zealand, to Peter Maxwell and his wife Isabella (née Campbell). He began his working career as a gold miner in Thames before moving to Queensland in 1886 to carry on his trade.

== Political career ==
Maxwell, representing the Labour Party, was elected to the Queensland Legislative Assembly as the member for Burke at the Queensland colonial election of 1899. In 1907 Maxwell left Labour to join William Kidston's "Kidstonites" party but he lost his seat at the state election of 1909.

== Personal life ==
On the 30 May 1892, Maxwell married Alice Bending in Croydon. Alice died the next year, and is buried in Georgetown cemetery. On the 26 September 1895 he married Mary Elizabeth Steele in Georgetown and together had 3 sons and 3 daughters. / They have a plaque together at Mt Gravatt Cemetery.

Maxwell died in Brisbane in 1921. His funeral moved from his residence in Ascot to the Nundah Cemetery. All of his children have memorial plaques in the family plot in Nundah Cemetery, albeit for John Maxwell who married Nellie Purdie from Capella. They have a plaque together at Mt Gravatt Cemetery. John Maxwell was the only one of his 6 children that married and had children. 1 daughter Elaine Steine, 2 sons John Maxwell and Raymond Maxwell. They lived on Oriel Rd Clayfield, near the Maxwell family home in Ascot, which all 5 of the other Maxwell siblings resided in together till their deaths.

Parliament of Queensland
Preceded by John Hoolan	Member for Burke; 1899–1909	Succeeded by Charles Collins
