= Electoral district of Stanley (Queensland) =

State electoral district of Queensland, Australia

Stanley Queensland—Legislative Assembly
- State: Queensland
- Created: 1873
- Abolished: 1950

The electoral district of Stanley was a Legislative Assembly electorate in the state of Queensland.

== History ==
Stanley was created by the Electoral Districts Act of 1872 as a single-member seat (taking effect from 1873). From 1878 it became a two-member constituency through incorporation of part of the Electoral district of West Moreton from which it had been derived in 1872. Stanley was abolished in the 1949 redistribution which placed most of it in the new Electoral district of Somerset.

== Members ==
The following people represented Stanley:

Member	Party	Term			
John Pettigrew		20 Nov 1873 – 10 Dec 1878	Member 2 (1878–1888)	Party	Term
Patrick O'Sullivan		10 Dec 1878 – 23 Aug 1883	William Kellett		10 Dec 1878 – 23 May 1888
Peter White		23 Aug 1883 – 23 May 1888	William Kellett		10 Dec 1878 – 23 May 1888
Patrick O'Sullivan		23 May 1888 – 29 April 1893			
Frederick Lord	Ministerialist	29 Apr 1893 – 11 Mar 1902			
William Summerville	Labor	11 Mar 1902 – 27 Aug 1904			
Henry Somerset	Ministerialist, Liberal, National	27 Aug 1904 – 9 Oct 1920			
Frederick Nott	Country/CPNP	9 Oct 1920 – 5 Dec 1927			
Ernest Grimstone	CPNP	25 Feb 1928 ^{[b]} – 22 Oct 1933			
Roy Bell	CPNP/Country	9 Dec 1933 ^{[b]} – 2 Apr 1938			
Duncan MacDonald	Country	2 Apr 1938 – 29 Apr 1950			

^{b} = by-election

== See also ==
- Electoral districts of Queensland
- Members of the Queensland Legislative Assembly by year
- Category:Members of the Queensland Legislative Assembly by name
