= George Phillips (Australian politician) =

Australian politician

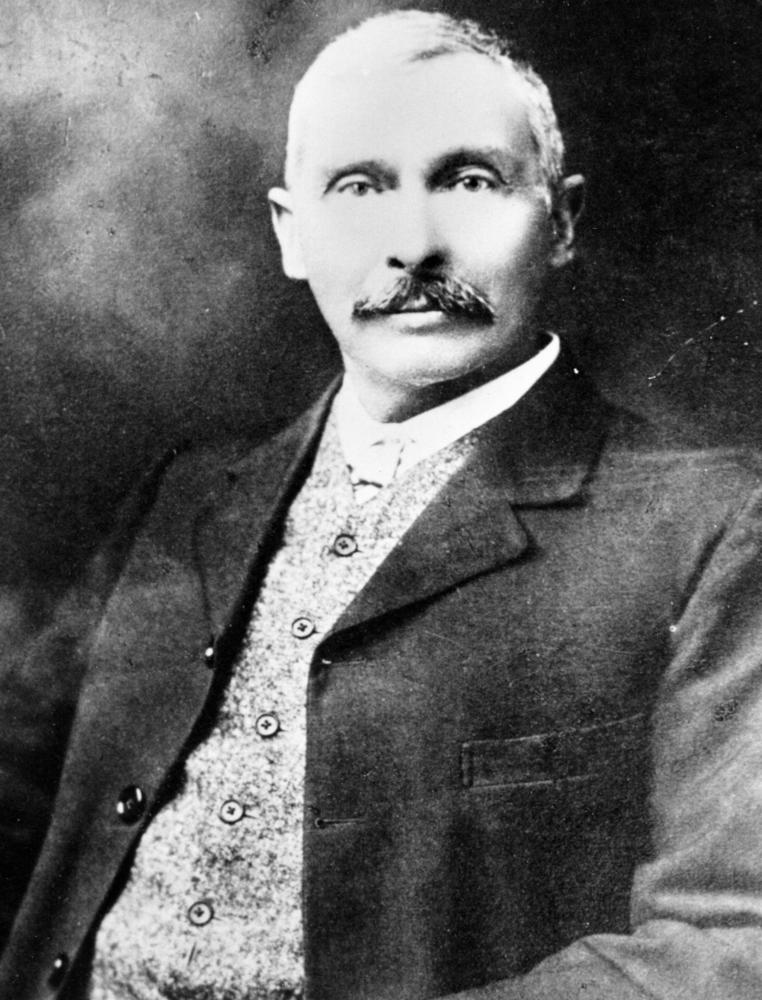

Member of the Queensland Legislative Assembly for Carpentaria
- In office 25 May 1893 – 11 April 1896
- Preceded by: Edward Palmer
- Succeeded by: George Sim

Personal details
- Born: George Phillips; 1843 Burslem, Staffordshire, England
- Died: 2 June 1921 (aged 77) Alderley, Queensland, Brisbane, Australia
- Resting place: Toowong Cemetery
- Spouse: Elizabeth Susan Bourner (m.1871 d.1943)
- Occupation: Surveyor, engineer

George Phillips (1843 – 2 June 1921) was a surveyor, and member of the Queensland Legislative Assembly in Australia.

== Early days ==
Phillips was born in Burslem, Staffordshire, England, on October 12, 1843, to parents George Phillips, and his wife Emily Irwin (née Onge). After arriving in New South Wales on the Merlin in September 1852 he was educated at Dr William Wools Private School in Parramatta. George settled in Brisbane, Queensland in 1862 at 19 years of age.

== Surveying career ==
Phillips joined the Roads Department in 1862 and in 1863 shifted to the Lands Department. He accompanied William Landsborough to Burketown in 1866 explored west of Bowen and discovered and named the Diamantina River. Landsborough and Phillips founded Normanton, he surveyed the town in 1867. In 1868 he became Staff Surveyor of Kennedy, surveying the towns of Bowen, Townsville, Cardwell, Ingham and Mackay.

Whilst in Bowen, George lodged at the Victoria Hotel, John Bourner was the licensee. He married Elizabeth Susan Bourner in Bowen on 6 February 1871.

In 1879 he joined Queensland Rail as Inspector of Surveys in the Southern Division. His passion for extending railways throughout Queensland resulted in Phillips inventing and patenting in 1884 the steel railway sleeper that could be used in the Gulf Country where floods and termites made normal railway track infeasible. These sleepers are still in use on the Normanton to Croydon railway line. In 1886 he resigned from Queensland Rail and established his own practice.

In 1895 he inspected the planned Cairns to Mulgrave tramway. In 1896 he was appointed Inspector of Artesian Bores. During 1902 and 1903 he supervised construction of the Beaudesert Tramway. In 1904 he became a member of the Brisbane Board of Waterworks and 1905 President of the Queensland Institute of Surveyors. In 1909 he returned to the Gulf Country at the Government’s request to report on railways and ports. During 1910 and 1911 he surveyed and engineered the Belmont Tramway. During 1911 to 1913 he supervised construction of the Aramac Tramway. In 1914 he was engineer for the Palmwoods - Buderim Tramway. In later years he advocated using sources of water on Stradbroke Island for Brisbane supply, writing a book on flood mitigation in the Brisbane River. These are some of his accomplishments there are numerous others, including laying out Toowong Cemetery. He was described as “a man of great ability, and of high professional reputation, but always ready for a chat or a joke and never failing when information was required".

== Political career ==
Phillips served in the Queensland Legislative Assembly for the seat of Carpentaria from 1893 until 1896.

== Personal life ==
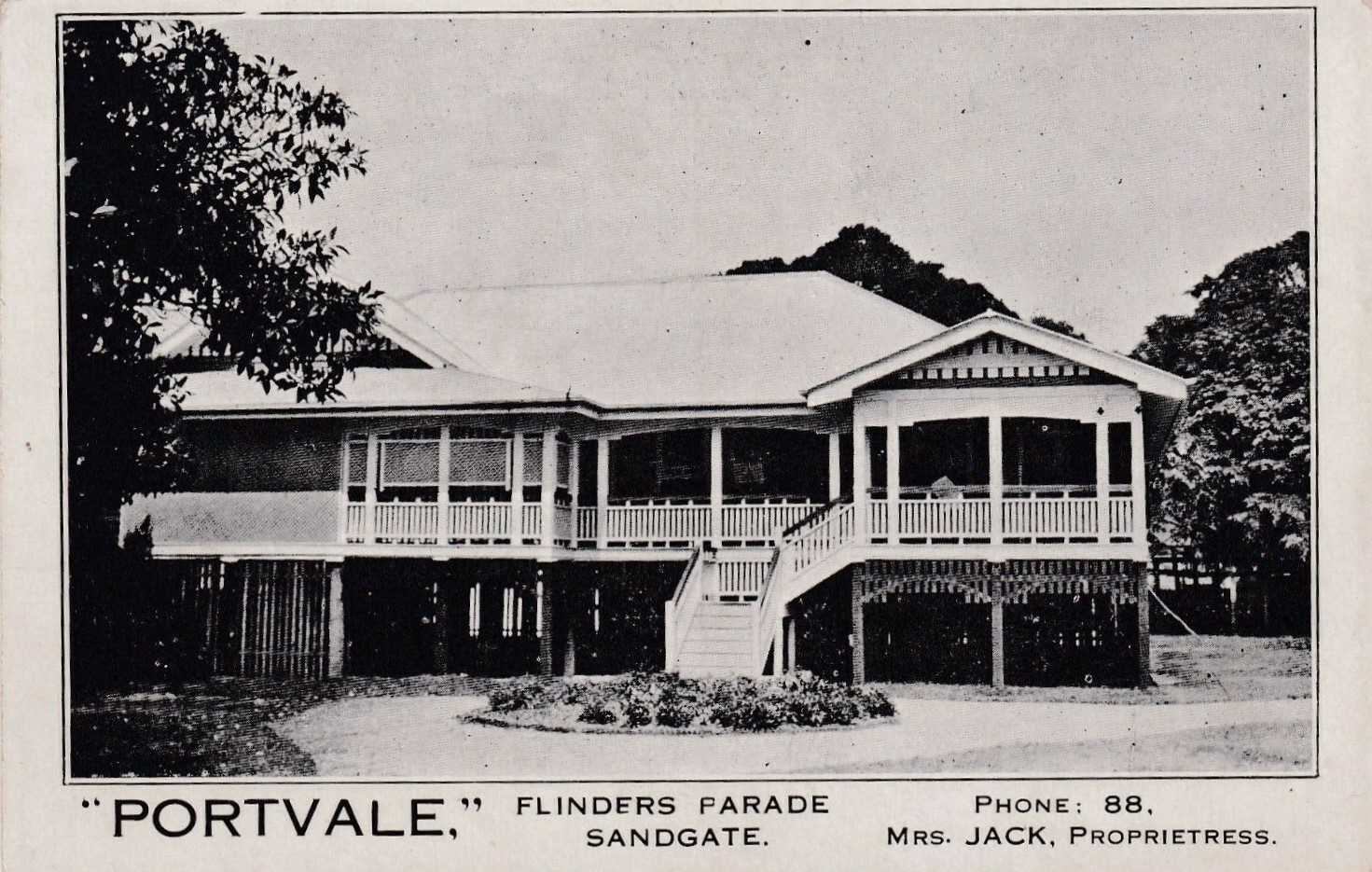
Phillips's long-time home, "Portvale", Flinders Parade, Sandgate, circa 1920

On the 6 February 1871 Phillips married Elizabeth Susan Bourner in Bowen. They had nine sons and six daughters.

He was a devout Baptist and in 1887 donated the land for the Sandgate Baptist Church.

He died on 2 June 1921 in Brisbane. His funeral proceeded from the Brisbane Baptist City Tabernacle to the Toowong Cemetery.

His wife Elizabeth died 13 April 1943. Her funeral was held at the Brisbane Baptist City Tabernacle and she was buried with her husband in a family grave at Toowong Cemetery.

== Legacy ==
The Norman to Croydon railway line was heritage-listed in 1992 and is still in use today by the Gulflander tourist train.

Parliament of Queensland
Preceded by Edward Palmer	Member for Carpentaria; 1893–1896	Succeeded by George Sim
