= James Forsyth (Australian politician) =

Australian politician

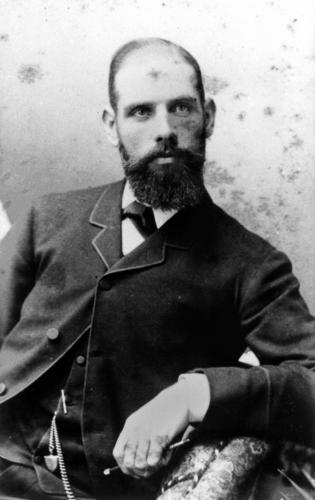

Member of the Queensland Legislative Assembly for Carpentaria
- In office 25 March 1899 – 18 May 1907
- Preceded by: George Sim
- Succeeded by: Thomas Nevitt

Member of the Queensland Legislative Assembly for Moreton
- In office 19 June 1909 – 27 April 1912
- Preceded by: John Campbell
- Succeeded by: Seat abolished

Member of the Queensland Legislative Assembly for Murrumba
- In office 27 April 1912 – 16 March 1918
- Preceded by: New seat
- Succeeded by: Richard Warren

Personal details
- Born: James Forsyth; 1852 West Plean, Stirling, Scotland
- Died: 14 October 1927 (aged 74 or 75) Brisbane, Queensland, Australia
- Resting place: Toowong Cemetery
- Party: Ministerial
- Other political affiliations: Opposition, Queensland Liberal
- Spouse: Helen Morrison Campbell (m.1882 d.1938)
- Occupation: Company director

James Forsyth (1852 – 14 October 1927) was a company director and member of the Queensland Legislative Assembly.

== Early days ==
Forsyth was born in West Plean, Stirling, Scotland, to parents John Forsyth, farmer, and his wife Janet (née Munnock). After receiving his education in West Plean he worked for Henderson Bros, Merchants in Stirling and spent five years with Arnott and Co. in Glasgow. He arrived in Sydney in early 1875 where he stayed almost a year, moving to Brisbane in December of the same year. In 1880 he was the manager at Normanton for James Burns & Co. and was mainly responsible for the company's expansion in the North Queensland area. When the businesses of Burns and Robert Philp were amalgamated in 1883, he became a director of Burns Philp.

== Political career ==
At the 1899 Queensland colonial elections, Forsyth, for the Ministerialists, won the seat of Carpentaria. He changed allegiance to the Opposition Party in 1904, led by his close friend, Robert Philp. He was defeated at the 1907 state elections.

Two years later, he won the seat of Moreton. By now, he was back with the Ministerialists. Forsyth held this seat for three years, switching to Murrumba. He held the seat until his retirement from politics in 1918.

Forsyth was the only MP to oppose the provision of the Elections Act 1915 that granted women the right to stand for parliament in Queensland. He stated that "I do not think myself that this is a place for a woman at all, and I hope that when we get into Committee we shall be able to have that innovation knocked out".

From 1919 until 1927 Forsyth was the honorary Consulate for Queensland in Japan.

== Personal life ==
In 1882, Forsyth married Helen Morrison Campbell (daughter of prominent Brisbane businessman James Campbell). They had no children. He died in 1927 and his funeral proceeded from Braelands, his former residence in Toowong to the Toowong Cemetery.

Parliament of Queensland
Preceded by George Sim	Member for Carpentaria; 1899–1907	Succeeded by Thomas Nevitt
Preceded by John Campbell	Member for Moreton; 1909–1912	Abolished
New seat	Member for Murrumba; 1912–1918	Succeeded by Richard Warren
