= Roger Sheaffe (politician) =

Australian politician

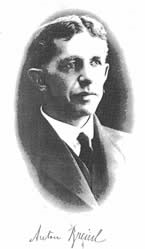

Member of the Queensland Legislative Assembly for Burke
- In office 14 November 1878 – 5 October 1883
- Preceded by: Patrick O'Sullivan
- Succeeded by: Edward Palmer

Personal details
- Born: Roger Hale Sheaffe; 9 April 1838 Wollongong, New South Wales, Australia
- Died: 1 December 1895 (aged 57) Brisbane, Queensland, Australia
- Resting place: Toowong Cemetery
- Spouse: Isobel Maria Robertson (m. 1874)
- Occupation: Pastoralist

Roger Hale Sheaffe (9 April 1838 – 1 December 1895) was a pastoralist and member of the Queensland Legislative Assembly.

== Early days ==
Sheaffe was born at Wollongong, New South Wales, to William Sheaffe, Captain in H.M. 50th Regiment, and his wife Rosalie (née Earle) and was educated at Wollongong Grammar School.

== Political career ==
Sheaffe was elected to the Queensland Legislative Assembly as the member for Burke in 1878 but did not stand for re-election in 1883. He went on to be mayor of Sandgate in 1892.

== Personal life ==
In 1874, Sheaffe married Isobel Maria Robertson in Wollongong and together had 3 sons and 1 daughter. Sheaffe died in Brisbane in 1895 and was buried in Toowong Cemetery.

Parliament of Queensland
Preceded by Patrick O'Sullivan	Member for Burke; 1878–1883	Succeeded by Edward Palmer
