= Electoral district of Carpentaria =

Former state electoral district of Queensland, Australia (1932–1960)

Carpentaria Queensland—Legislative Assembly
- State: Queensland
- Dates current: 1888–1912,1932–1960
- Demographic: Rural

Carpentaria was a Legislative Assembly electorate in the state of Queensland, Australia.

== History ==
Carpentaria was created by the Electoral Districts Act of 1887, taking effect at the 1888 elections. It was based in far northern Queensland.

Carpentaria was abolished at the 1912 elections, split into Electoral district of Burke and Electoral district of Cook. Carpentaria was recreated at the 1932 elections, replacing Flinders.

== Members ==
The following people were elected in the seat of Carpentaria:

First incarnation 1888–1912
Member	Party	Term
Edward Palmer	none	1888–1893
George Phillips	none	1893–1896
George Charles Sim	Labor	1896–1899
James Forsyth	Ministerial	1899–1907
Thomas Nevitt	Labor	1907–1912

Second incarnation 1932–1960
Member	Party	Term
John Mullan	Labor	1932–1941
Norm Smith	Labor	1941–1957
Norm Smith	QLP	1957–1960

== See also ==
- Electoral districts of Queensland
- Members of the Queensland Legislative Assembly by year
- Category:Members of the Queensland Legislative Assembly by name
