= William Hodgkinson (politician) =

Australian politician

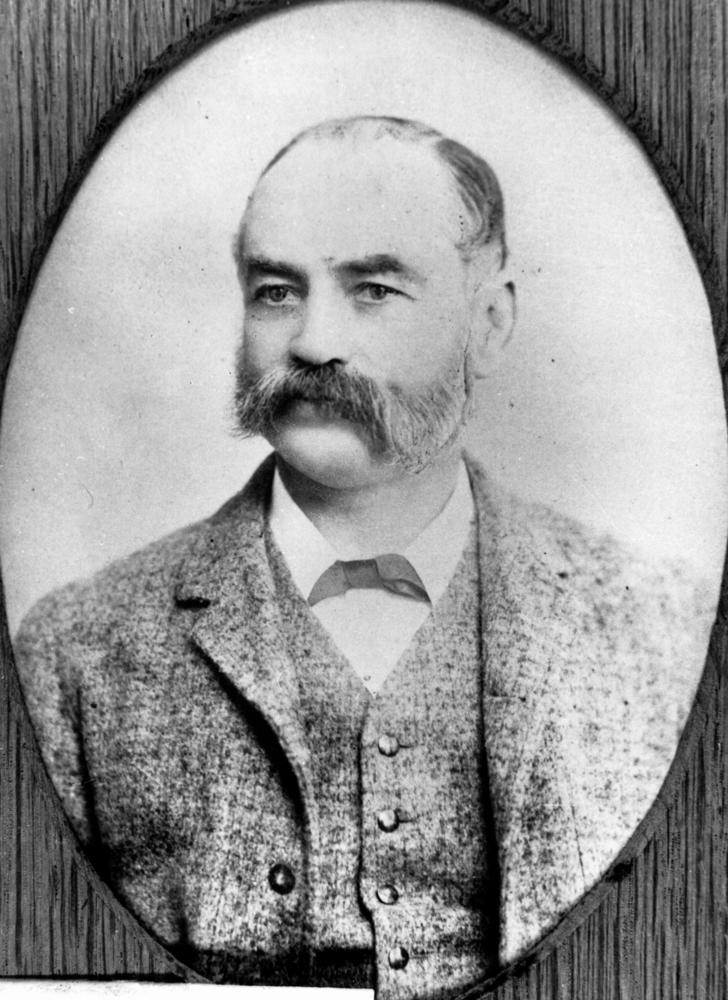

Member of the Queensland Legislative Assembly for Burke
- In office 4 December 1873 – 14 September 1875
- Preceded by: New seat
- Succeeded by: James Parker
- In office 19 May 1888 – 13 May 1893 Serving with Ernest Hunter, John Hoolan
- Preceded by: New seat
- Succeeded by: Seat abolished

Personal details
- Born: William Oswald Hodgkinson; 31 March 1835 Handsworth, Warwick, England
- Died: 23 July 1900 (aged 65) Brisbane, Queensland, Australia
- Resting place: Toowong Cemetery
- Spouse: Kate Robertson (m.1862 d.?)
- Occupation: Explorer, Newspaper editor, Gold miner

William Oswald Hodgkinson (1835–1900) was an Australian explorer, journalist, gold miner, and politician.

== Biography ==
William Oswald Hodgkinson was born on 31 March 1835 in Handsworth, Warwick, England. His father, also named William Oswald Hodgkinson, was a civil engineer and his mother was Harriet Hodgkinson, née Brown.

Hodgkinson was educated at Birmingham Grammar School and by 1851 was a midshipman in the merchant marine. He soon emigrated to Australia, working for the government in Victoria on the Tarnagulla and Forest Creek goldfields. After a short-lived return to England he went to work as a journalist in Australia, starting in 1859, and in 1860 joined the Burke and Wills expedition. Hodgkinson left the expedition before it ended in disaster at Cooper Creek, and went on to join first Alfred William Howitt’s Victorian Relief Expedition, which aimed to establish the fate of the Burke and Wills expedition, and then in 1861 the John McKinlay relief party, on which he served as second-in-command.

Hodgkinson next continued his journalistic career, working as editor for Rockhampton's Morning Bulletin before founding Mackay's first newspaper, the Daily Mercury, in 1866. Returning to the gold mining business in 1868, he worked in the Ravenswood and Cape goldfields for the next two years. In 1870, at the Etheridge goldfield, he became a mining warden and police magistrate, two posts that propelled him onto the Legislative Assembly of Queensland representing the electoral district of Burke in 1874. In 1875, he resigned his seat in order to head up a government expedition that was to report on the potential of some unexplored land mining, pastoral, and agricultural purposes.

This expedition, focused on the area between Etheridge and Cloncurry goldfields, explored the Diamantina, Mulligan, and Herbert river systems and headed north through Normanton and up the Cloncurry and Flinders Rivers, concluding at Brisbane.

Throughout the late 1870s and 1880s Hodgkinson became more involved in politics as mining warden and in 1888 was requested to stand for six electorates. He stood for Burke and was successful, and in 1890 he became the Minister of Mines and Public Instruction. In 1893, he was defeated by Labor candidate John Hoolan and lost his seat.

Hodgkinson spent much of the 1890s in Sydney and Western Australia, working as an expert in mining. He died of influenza on 23 July 1900 and was buried in Toowong Cemetery.

Parliament of Queensland
New seat	Member for Burke; 1873–1875	Succeeded by James Parker
New seat	Member for Burke; 1888–1893; Served alongside: Ernest Hunter, John Hoolan	Abolished
