= Electoral district of Bundamba =

State electoral district of Queensland, Australia

Bundamba Queensland—Legislative Assembly
- Bundamba electoral map 2017
- State: Queensland
- MP: Lance McCallum
- Party: Labor
- Namesake: Bundamba
- Electors: 38,035 (2020)
- Area: 150 km^{2} (57.9 sq mi)
- Demographic: Provincial
- Coordinates: 27°40′S 152°52′E
Electorates around Bundamba:
| Ipswich West | Moggill | Inala |
| Ipswich | Bundamba | Jordan |
| Ipswich | Jordan | Jordan |

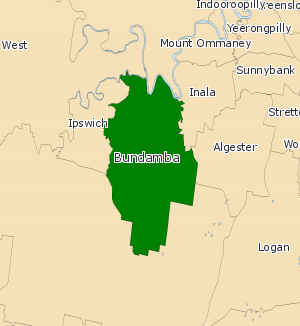
Electoral map of Bundamba 2008

Bundamba is a Legislative Assembly of Queensland electoral division in the state of Queensland, Australia.

The electorate encompasses suburbs in the east and south-east of the City of Ipswich local government area. Major locations include Bundamba, Blackstone, Goodna, Redbank Plains, Augustine Heights and Springfield.

Bundamba was also the name of a previous electorate that existed between 1873 and 1912. The seat has been held by the Labor Party since it was recreated in 1992, and for much of that time has been a reasonably safe Labor seat. In the 2006 state election, Labor's Jo-Ann Miller won the seat with 68.5% of the vote. Miller first won the seat in a by-election in February 2000 which was a record vote in a by-election towards a Government. She was the 100th ALP woman elected to Parliament.

Miller was nearly swept out in Labor's near-meltdown of 2012, in which her majority was pared back from a comfortably safe 21.2 percent to an extremely marginal 1.8 percent. The only other time that Labor's hold on the seat was even remotely threatened came in 1998, in which an unexpected surge by One Nation saw the Labor margin knocked down to 6.2 percent even as Labor won a minority government.

However, the seat reverted to form in 2017, in which Miller's majority ballooned to 21.4 percent. She resigned in 2020 and was succeeded by current member Lance McCallum.

== Members for Bundamba ==
First incarnation (1873–1912)
| Member | Party | Term |
|---|---|---|
| Simon Fraser | Unaligned | 1873–1878 |
| William Hendren | Unaligned | 1878–1880 |
| James Foote | Unaligned | 1880–1888 |
| Thomas Glassey | Labor | 1888–1893 |
| Lewis Thomas | Ministerialist | 1893–1899 |
| James Clarke Cribb | Various^{1} | 1899–1912 |
Second incarnation (1992–present)
| Member | Party | Term |
| Bob Gibbs | Labor | 1992–1999 |
| Jo-Ann Miller | Labor | 2000–2020 |
| Lance McCallum | Labor | 2020–present |

^{1} James Cribb, member for Rosewood 1893–1896, Bundamba 1899–1912 and Bremer 1912–1915 alternately listed his party status as Ministerialist and Opposition. The parliamentary members' register does not list dates for these changes.

== Election results ==
2024 Queensland state election: Bundamba
| Party | Candidate | Votes | % | ±% |
|---|---|---|---|---|
| Labor | Lance McCallum | 15,326 | 43.66 | −12.24 |
| Liberal National | Carl Mutzelberg | 8,872 | 25.27 | +10.27 |
| Greens | Tracey Nayler | 3,743 | 10.66 | +0.36 |
| One Nation | Kelvin Brown | 3,011 | 8.58 | −6.32 |
| Legalise Cannabis | Clive Brazier | 1,612 | 4.59 | +4.59 |
| Family First | Jeremy Williams | 1,150 | 3.28 | +3.28 |
| Animal Justice | Angela Lowery | 808 | 2.30 | −1.30 |
| Independent Progressives | Edward Carroll | 582 | 1.66 | +1.66 |
| Total formal votes | | 35,104 | 93.86 | −1.91 |
| Informal votes | | 2,296 | 6.14 | +1.91 |
| Turnout | | 37,400 | 82.25 | −1.29 |
Two-party-preferred result
| Labor | Lance McCallum | 22,396 | 63.80 | −7.40 |
| Liberal National | Carl Mutzelberg | 12,708 | 36.20 | +7.40 |
| Labor hold | | Swing | -7.40 | |
