= Jo-Ann Miller =

Australian politician

Minister for Police, Fire and Emergency Services Minister for Corrective Services
- In office 16 February 2015 – 4 December 2015
- Premier: Annastacia Palaszczuk
- Preceded by: Jack Dempsey
- Succeeded by: Bill Byrne

Shadow Minister for Health, Natural Resources and Mines
- In office 19 April 2012 – 14 February 2015
- Leader: Annastacia Palaszczuk
- Preceded by: Mark McArdle (Health); Jack Dempsey (Natural Resources and Mines)
- Succeeded by: Mark McArdle (Health); Andrew Cripps (Natural Resources and Mines)

Shadow Minister for Housing
- In office 19 April 2012 – 5 August 2014
- Leader: Annastacia Palaszczuk
- Preceded by: Fiona Simpson
- Succeeded by: Yvette D'Ath

Member of the Queensland Legislative Assembly for Bundamba
- In office 5 February 2000 – 20 February 2020
- Preceded by: Bob Gibbs
- Succeeded by: Lance McCallum

Personal details
- Born: 22 August 1958 (age 68) Ipswich, Queensland
- Party: Labor
- Spouse: Neil
- Education: Queensland University of Technology

Jo-Ann Roslyn Miller (born 22 August 1958) is an Australian politician. She was a Labor Party member of the Legislative Assembly of Queensland between February 2000 and February 2020, representing the electorate of Bundamba.

Miller entered parliament in a 2000 by-election upon the resignation of the former member for Bundamba, Bob Gibbs. Bundamba was considered a safe seat for the Labor Party, and Miller won all the elections in the seat from 2001 to 2017.

Following Labor's defeat in the 2012 election, Miller was elevated to the frontbench. On 16 February 2015 she was sworn in as Minister for Police, Fire and Emergency Services and Minister for Corrective Services in the Palaszczuk Ministry.

On 4 December 2015, Miller resigned from cabinet following a Queensland Parliamentary Ethics Committee Report stating that although she had not been guilty of contempt of Parliament, she had engaged in a "pattern of reckless conduct." The committee's investigation focused on revelations Miller had signed a document stating she had correctly disposed of confidential Parliamentary Crime and Corruption Committee papers, which were later found by an Opposition MP in a safe used to store those papers.

Her resignation came one day after Premier Annastacia Palaszczuk signalled her intention to remove Miller from her portfolios.

In October 2018, Miller voted against the government's successful proposal to decriminalise abortion in Queensland, making her the only Labor Party MP to do so.

In January 2020, it was reported that Miller was considering resigning her seat in order to contest the City of Ipswich mayoral election, to be held on 28 March. Miller resigned as the Member for Bundamba on 20 February 2020, but announced she would not seek election to Ipswich City Council.

Parliament of Queensland
Preceded by Bob Gibbs	Member for Bundamba; 2000–2020	Succeeded by Lance McCallum
Political offices
Preceded by Jack Dempsey	Minister for Police, Fire and Emergency Services; 2015	Succeeded by Bill Byrne
Preceded by Jack Dempsey	Minister for Corrective Services; 2015	Succeeded by Bill Byrne
