= Electoral district of Fitzroy (Queensland) =

Former state electoral district of Queensland (1992–2009)

Fitzroy Queensland—Legislative Assembly
- State: Queensland
- Dates current: 1888–1960; 1992–2009
- Namesake: Fitzroy River

Fitzroy was an electoral district of the Legislative Assembly in the Australian state of Queensland.

The district was based in central Queensland, west of Rockhampton. It included the towns of Baralaba, Blackwater, Duaringa, Dysart, Mount Morgan and Wowan as well as some of Rockhampton's outer suburbs. The electorate was first contested in 1992. An earlier district based in the same region was also called Fitzroy. It was first contested in 1888 and abolished in 1960.

In 2008, Fitzroy was abolished—with effect at the 2009 state election—as a result of a redistribution undertaken by the Electoral Commission of Queensland. Its former territory and voters were divided between the districts of Callide, Gregory, Mirani and Rockhampton.

== Members for Fitzroy ==
First incarnation (1888–1960)
Member	Party	Term
Robert Lyons	Conservative	1888–1889
Albert Callan	Independent	1889–1902
Henri Cowap	Labor	1902–1907
Henri Cowap	Kidstonites	1907–1909
James Crawford	Labor	1909–1911
James Crawford	Independent	1911–1912
Kenneth Grant	Liberal	1912–1915
Harold Hartley	Labor	1915–1929
William Carter	Country and Progressive National	1929–1932
Jens Peterson	Country and Progressive National	1932–1935
Jim Clark	Labor	1935–1960
Second incarnation (1992–2009)
Member	Party	Term
Jim Pearce	Labor	1992–2009

== See also ==
- Electoral districts of Queensland
- Members of the Queensland Legislative Assembly by year
- Category:Members of the Queensland Legislative Assembly by name
