= Robert Lyons (Australian politician) =

Australian politician

Robert Lyons (24 January 1849 – 8 April 1892) was a politician in colonial Queensland. He was a member of the Queensland Legislative Assembly from 1888 to 1889, representing the electorate of Fitzroy.
