= Thomas Glassey =

Australian politician

The Honourable Thomas Glassey
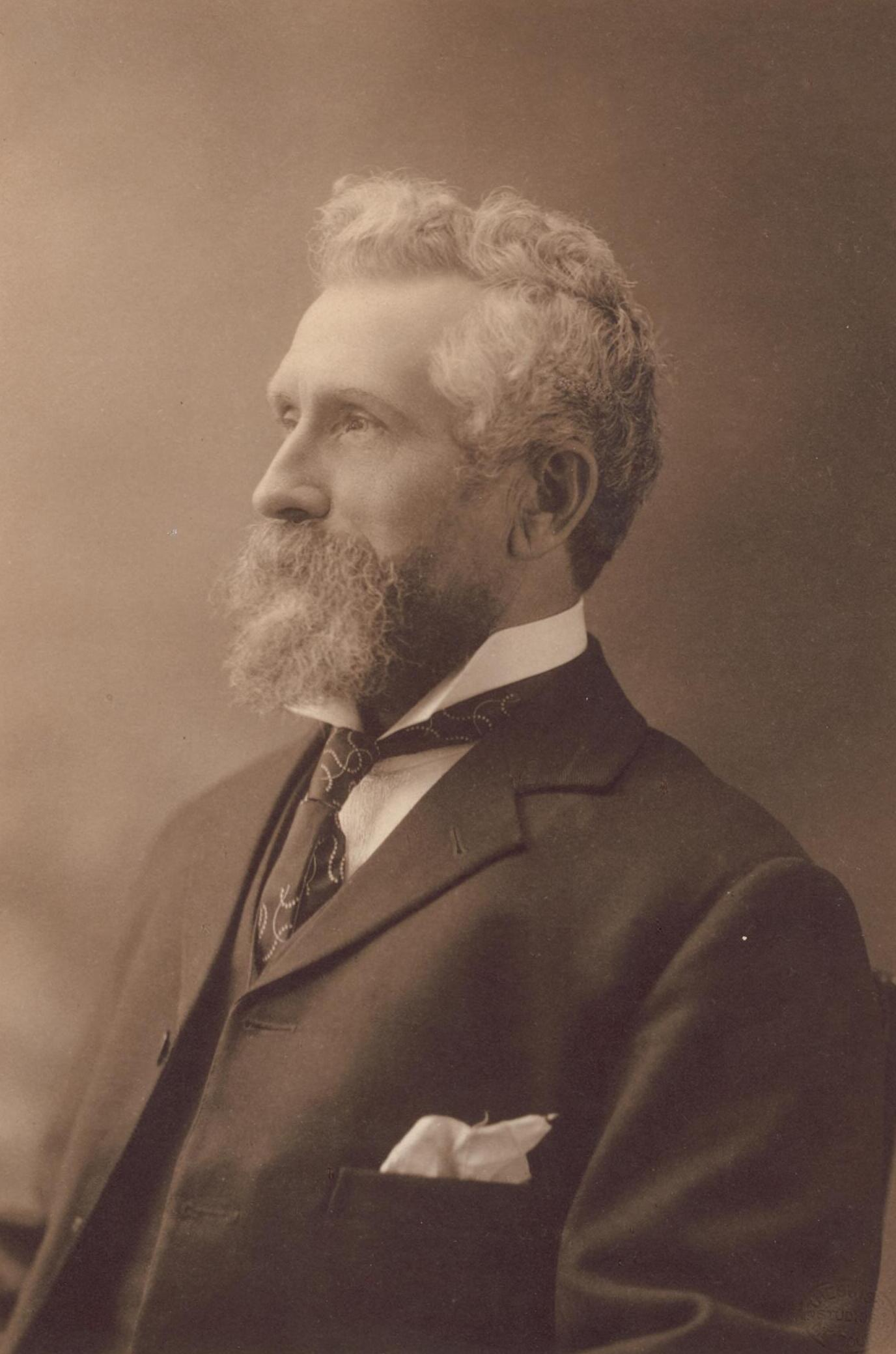

Senator for Queensland
- In office 30 March 1901 – 31 December 1903

Leader of the Opposition of Queensland
- In office 30 August 1898 – 12 May 1899
- Succeeded by: Anderson Dawson

Member of the Queensland Legislative Assembly for Bundamba
- In office 12 May 1888 – 13 May 1893
- Preceded by: James Foote
- Succeeded by: Lewis Thomas

Member of the Queensland Legislative Assembly for Burke
- In office 16 June 1894 – 21 March 1896
- Preceded by: John Hoolan
- Succeeded by: John Hoolan

Member of the Queensland Legislative Assembly for Bundaberg
- In office 21 March 1896 – 22 June 1901
- Preceded by: Michael Duffy
- Succeeded by: George Barber

Personal details
- Born: 26 February 1844 Markethill, Armagh, Ireland
- Died: 28 September 1936 (aged 92) Brisbane, Queensland, Australia
- Resting place: Toowong Cemetery
- Party: Protectionist Party
- Other political affiliations: Labour Party
- Spouse: Margaret Fergeson White (m.1864 d.1899)
- Occupation: Miner

Thomas Glassey (26 February 1844 – 28 September 1936) was an Irish-born Australian politician.

Born in Markethill, County Armagh, he received no formal education, working as a mill-worker and miner in Scotland and England. He migrated to Australia around 1885, when he became a miner at Bundamba, and was Secretary of the Bundamba Miners Association. He was a founding member of the Australian Labor Party in Queensland. He was the first Labor member of any Australian parliament when he was elected to the Legislative Assembly of Queensland in 1888 as the member for Bundamba.

Defeated in 1893, he was subsequently a member of Burke from 1894 to 1896 and Bundaberg from 1896 to 1900. He left the Labor Party in 1899 over the party's socialist objective. In 1901, he was elected to the Australian Senate for Queensland, unofficially as a Protectionist (though there was no protectionist organisation in Queensland at the time). In 1903, the National Liberal Union endorsed non-Labor candidates, and Glassey, as a Deakinite, did not receive endorsement. He contested the Senate as an independent protectionist and received 25.6% of the vote, but was not elected.

Glassey died in 1936 and was buried in Toowong Cemetery.

== Gallery ==
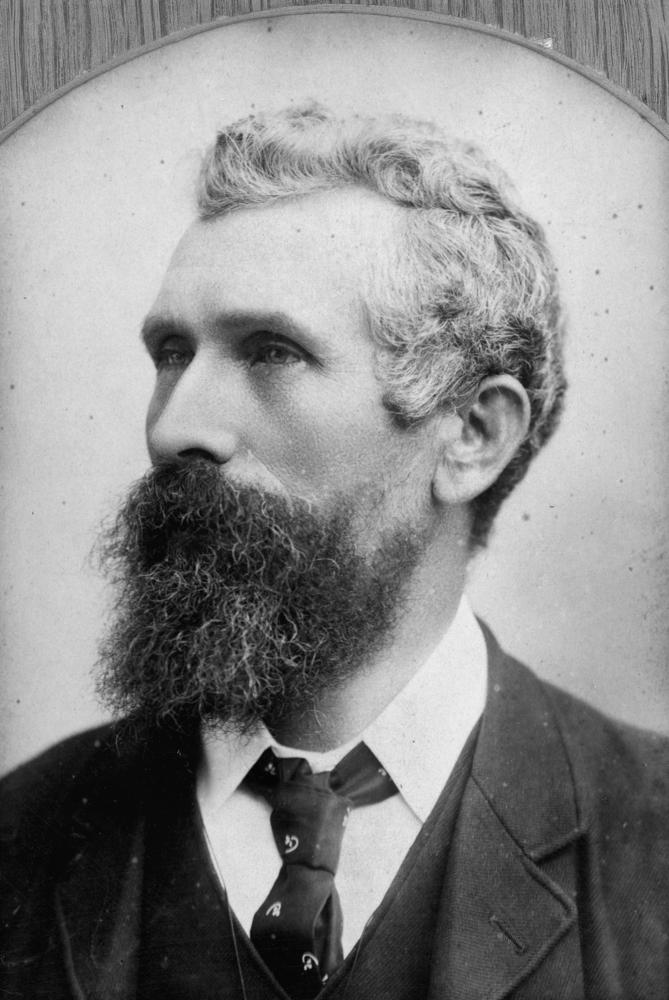
Glassey in 1899

== Works ==
- To the Women Electors of Queensland, Brisbane: Thomas Glassey, 1903, Wikidata Q107402068

Political offices
Preceded by New Role	Leader of the Opposition of Queensland; 1898–1899	Succeeded by Anderson Dawson
Parliament of Queensland
Preceded by James Foote	Member for Bundamba; 1888–1893	Succeeded by Lewis Thomas
Preceded by John Hoolan	Member for Burke; 1894–1896	Succeeded by John Hoolan
Preceded by Michael Duffy	Member for Bundaberg; 1896–1901	Succeeded by George Barber
Parliament of Australia
Preceded by Federation Parliament	Senator for Queensland; 1901–1903; Served alongside: John Ferguson	Succeeded by Harry Turley and Thomas Givens
