= Electoral district of Burke =

Former electoral district of Queensland, Australia

Burke Queensland—Legislative Assembly
- State: Queensland
- Dates current: 1873–1932, 1960–1972
- Demographic: Rural

Burke was an electoral district of the Legislative Assembly in the Australian state of Queensland from 1873 to 1932, and again from 1960 to 1972. It covered remote rural areas in Northwest Queensland.

It originally existed as a single-member district until 1888, when it was changed to a dual-member district. This was changed at the next election when it was split into two single electorates - Burke and Croydon. Burke was amalgamated into the district of Carpentaria from the 1932 election, but was revived for the 1960 election, until it was finally abolished at the 1972 election and renamed Mount Isa.

== Members for Burke ==
First incarnation (1873–1932)
Member	Party	Term			
William Hodgkinson		1873—1875			
James Parker		1875—1876			
Patrick O'Sullivan		1876—1878			
Roger Sheaffe		1878—1883	Dual member electorate (1888–1893)		
Edward Palmer		1883—1888	Member 2	Party	Term
Ernest Hunter		1888—1890	William Hodgkinson		1888—1893
John Hoolan	Labor	1890—1894	William Hodgkinson		1888—1893
Thomas Glassey	Labor	1894—1896			
John Hoolan	Labor	1896—1899			
William Maxwell	Labor	1899—1907			
William Maxwell	Kidstonites	1907—1909			
Charles Collins	Labor	1909—1912			
William Murphy	Independent	1912—1918			
Darby Riordan	Labor	1918—1929			
Arthur Jones	Labor	1929—1932			

Second incarnation (1960—1972)
Member	Party	Term
Alec Inch	Labor	1960—1972

== See also ==
- Electoral districts of Queensland
- Members of the Queensland Legislative Assembly by year
- Category:Members of the Queensland Legislative Assembly by name
