= Edward Palmer (Australian politician) =

Australian politician

Member of the Queensland Legislative Assembly for Burke
- In office 5 October 1883 – 19 May 1888
- Preceded by: Roger Sheaffe
- Succeeded by: Ernest Hunter

Member of the Queensland Legislative Assembly for Carpentaria
- In office 26 May 1888 – 25 May 1893
- Preceded by: New seat
- Succeeded by: George Phillips

Personal details
- Born: Edward Palmer; 8 March 1842 Wollongong, New South Wales, Australia
- Died: 3 May 1899 (aged 57) Rockhampton, Queensland, Australia
- Resting place: South Rockhampton Cemetery
- Occupation: Pastoralist, politician

Edward Palmer (8 March 1842 – 3 May 1899) was an Australian pastoralist and conservative Queensland politician.

Palmer was born in Sydney. He was a member of the Legislative Assembly of Queensland for Burke from 1883 to 1888, a member for Carpentaria from 1888 to 1893, and a member for Flinders from 1889 to 1896. He was a supporter of Thomas McIlwraith. Palmer is today best known as the author of the frequently cited reminiscences 'Early Days in North Queensland'.

Palmer died in 1899 and was buried in South Rockhampton Cemetery.

Parliament of Queensland
| Preceded by Roger Sheaffe | Member for Burke; 1883–1888 | Succeeded by Ernest Hunter |
| New seat | Member for Carpentaria; 1888–1893 | Succeeded by George Phillips |
