= Electoral results for the district of Ipswich =

Queensland, Australia, district election results

This is a list of electoral results for the electoral district of Ipswich in Queensland state elections.

== Members for Ipswich ==
First incarnation (1860–1960), 3 members until 1873
| Member 1 | Party | Term | Member 2 | Party | Term | Member 3 | Party | Term |
|---|---|---|---|---|---|---|---|---|
| Frederick Forbes | Unaligned | 1860–1863 | Patrick O'Sullivan | Unaligned | 1860–1863 | Arthur Macalister | Unaligned | 1860–1868 |
| Ratcliffe Pring | Unaligned | 1863–1866 | Henry Challinor | Unaligned | 1863–1868 | Arthur Macalister | Unaligned | 1860–1868 |
| George Reed | Unaligned | 1866–1867 | John Thompson | Unaligned | 1868–1873 | Henry Williams | Unaligned | 1868–1870 |
| John Murphy | Unaligned | 1867–1870 | John Thompson | Unaligned | 1868–1873 | Henry Williams | Unaligned | 1868–1870 |
| Benjamin Cribb | Unaligned | 1870–1873 | John Thompson | Unaligned | 1868–1873 | John Johnston | Unaligned | 1870–1872 |
| Benjamin Cribb | Unaligned | 1870–1873 | John Thompson | Unaligned | 1868–1873 | Arthur Macalister | Unaligned | 1872–1873 |
1873–1878, 1 member
| Member | Party | Term | | | | | | |
| Arthur Macalister | Unaligned | 1873–1876 | | | | | | |
| George Thorn, Jr. | Unaligned | 1876–1878 | | | | | | |
1878–1912, 2 members
| Member 1 | Party | Term | Member 2 | Party | Term | | | |
| John Thompson | Unaligned | 1878–1881 | John MacFarlane | Ministerialist | 1878–1894 | | | |
| Josiah Francis | Unaligned | 1881–1883 | John MacFarlane | Ministerialist | 1878–1894 | | | |
| William Salkeld | Unaligned | 1883–1888 | John MacFarlane | Ministerialist | 1878–1894 | | | |
| Andrew Henry Barlow | Ministerialist | 1888–1896 | John MacFarlane | Ministerialist | 1878–1894 | | | |
| James Wilkinson | Labour | 1894–1896 | Alfred Stephenson | Ministerialist | 1896–1902 | | | |
| Thomas Bridson Cribb | Ministerialist | 1896–1904 | Sir James Blair | Independent/ Ministerialist/ Opposition | 1902–1912 | | | |
| William Maughan | Labour | 1904–1912 | Sir James Blair | Independent/ Ministerialist/ Opposition | 1902–1912 | | | |
1912–1960, 1 member
| Member | Party | Term | | | | | | |
| Sir James Blair | Ministerialist/Independent | 1912–1915 | | | | | | |
| David Gledson | Labor | 1915–1929 | | | | | | |
| James Walker | Country and Progressive National | 1929–1932 | | | | | | |
| David Gledson | Labor | 1932–1949 | | | | | | |
| Ivor Marsden | Labor | 1949–1960 | | | | | | |

Second incarnation (1972–present), 1 member
| Member | Party | Term |
|---|---|---|
| Llew Edwards | Liberal | 1972–1983 |
| David Hamill | Labor | 1983–2001 |
| Rachel Nolan | Labor | 2001–2012 |
| Ian Berry | Liberal National | 2012–2015 |
| Jennifer Howard | Labor | 2015–present |

== Election results ==
=== Elections in the 2020s ===
2024 Queensland state election: Ipswich
| Party | Candidate | Votes | % | ±% |
|---|---|---|---|---|
| Labor | Jennifer Howard | 14,069 | 42.64 | −9.16 |
| Liberal National | Damian Culpeper | 9,604 | 29.10 | +8.77 |
| Greens | Amanda Holly | 3,527 | 10.69 | +2.25 |
| One Nation | Mathew Riesenweber | 2,427 | 7.36 | −6.55 |
| Legalise Cannabis | Deborah Forrester | 1,734 | 5.25 | −0.27 |
| Family First | Karen Fuller | 1,637 | 4.96 | +4.96 |
| Total formal votes | | 32,998 | 95.56 | −1.36 |
| Informal votes | | 1,533 | 4.44 | +1.36 |
| Turnout | | 35,916 | 87.45 | +0.49 |
Two-party-preferred result
| Labor | Jennifer Howard | 19,435 | 58.90 | −7.62 |
| Liberal National | Damian Culpeper | 13,563 | 41.10 | +7.62 |
| Labor hold | | Swing | −7.62 | |

2020 Queensland state election: Ipswich
| Party | Candidate | Votes | % | ±% |
|---|---|---|---|---|
| Labor | Jennifer Howard | 14,699 | 51.80 | +3.82 |
| Liberal National | Scott O'Connell | 5,769 | 20.33 | +6.43 |
| One Nation | Suzie Holmes | 3,947 | 13.91 | −12.70 |
| Greens | Pat Walsh | 2,396 | 8.44 | −0.24 |
| Legalise Cannabis | Shelly Morton | 1,565 | 5.52 | +5.52 |
| Total formal votes | | 28,376 | 96.92 | +2.14 |
| Informal votes | | 903 | 3.08 | −2.14 |
| Turnout | | 29,279 | 86.96 | −1.73 |
Two-party-preferred result
| Labor | Jennifer Howard | 18,876 | 66.52 | +2.20 |
| Liberal National | Scott O'Connell | 9,500 | 33.48 | −2.20 |
| Labor hold | | Swing | +2.20 | |

=== Elections in the 2010s ===
2017 Queensland state election: Ipswich
| Party | Candidate | Votes | % | ±% |
|---|---|---|---|---|
| Labor | Jennifer Howard | 12,815 | 48.0 | −4.5 |
| One Nation | Malcolm Roberts | 7,106 | 26.6 | +25.8 |
| Liberal National | Andrew Caswell | 3,712 | 13.9 | −14.4 |
| Greens | Brett Morrissey | 2,319 | 8.7 | +0.9 |
| Independent | Troy Aggett | 757 | 2.8 | +2.8 |
| Total formal votes | | 26,709 | 94.8 | −3.2 |
| Informal votes | | 1,473 | 5.2 | +3.2 |
| Turnout | | 28,182 | 88.7 | +0.9 |
Two-candidate-preferred result
| Labor | Jennifer Howard | 16,262 | 60.9 | −5.1 |
| One Nation | Malcolm Roberts | 10,447 | 39.1 | +39.1 |
| Labor hold | | Swing | −5.1 | |

2015 Queensland state election: Ipswich
| Party | Candidate | Votes | % | ±% |
|---|---|---|---|---|
| Labor | Jennifer Howard | 15,904 | 53.23 | +22.08 |
| Liberal National | Ian Berry | 8,526 | 28.53 | −7.33 |
| Greens | Pat Walsh | 2,245 | 7.51 | +1.90 |
| Independent | Patricia Petersen | 1,767 | 5.91 | −2.93 |
| Family First | Tim Stieler | 1,438 | 4.81 | +1.66 |
| Total formal votes | | 29,880 | 97.94 | +0.61 |
| Informal votes | | 629 | 2.06 | −0.61 |
| Turnout | | 30,509 | 91.42 | −0.59 |
Two-party-preferred result
| Labor | Jennifer Howard | 18,517 | 65.90 | +20.09 |
| Liberal National | Ian Berry | 9,581 | 34.10 | −20.09 |
| Labor gain from Liberal National | | Swing | +20.09 | |

2012 Queensland state election: Ipswich
| Party | Candidate | Votes | % | ±% |
|---|---|---|---|---|
| Liberal National | Ian Berry | 10,023 | 35.87 | +6.81 |
| Labor | Rachel Nolan | 8,703 | 31.14 | −29.02 |
| Katter's Australian | Will Keys | 4,041 | 14.46 | +14.46 |
| Independent | Patricia Petersen | 2,470 | 8.84 | +8.84 |
| Greens | Veronica White | 1,568 | 5.61 | −1.09 |
| Family First | Tim Stieler | 880 | 3.15 | −0.93 |
| Independent | Robert Jeremy | 259 | 0.93 | +0.93 |
| Total formal votes | | 27,944 | 97.33 | −0.73 |
| Informal votes | | 767 | 2.67 | +0.73 |
| Turnout | | 28,711 | 92.01 | −0.50 |
Two-party-preferred result
| Liberal National | Ian Berry | 12,243 | 54.19 | +20.90 |
| Labor | Rachel Nolan | 10,351 | 45.81 | −20.90 |
| Liberal National gain from Labor | | Swing | +20.90 | |

=== Elections in the 2000s ===
2009 Queensland state election: Ipswich
| Party | Candidate | Votes | % | ±% |
|---|---|---|---|---|
| Labor | Rachel Nolan | 16,598 | 60.2 | −5.8 |
| Liberal National | Suzie Holmes | 8,018 | 29.1 | +3.2 |
| Greens | Peter Luxton | 1,848 | 6.7 | −1.3 |
| Family First | Elwyn Denman | 1,125 | 4.1 | +4.1 |
| Total formal votes | | 27,589 | 97.9 | |
| Informal votes | | 545 | 2.1 | |
| Turnout | | 28,134 | 92.5 | |
Two-party-preferred result
| Labor | Rachel Nolan | 17,581 | 66.7 | −4.7 |
| Liberal National | Suzie Holmes | 8,774 | 33.3 | +4.7 |
| Labor hold | | Swing | −4.7 | |

2006 Queensland state election: Ipswich
| Party | Candidate | Votes | % | ±% |
|---|---|---|---|---|
| Labor | Rachel Nolan | 16,033 | 66.2 | +2.0 |
| Liberal | Simon Pointer | 6,223 | 25.7 | +0.3 |
| Greens | Rob Speirs | 1,969 | 8.1 | +1.6 |
| Total formal votes | | 24,225 | 97.9 | +0.0 |
| Informal votes | | 518 | 2.1 | −0.0 |
| Turnout | | 24,743 | 92.5 | −0.8 |
Two-party-preferred result
| Labor | Rachel Nolan | 16,653 | 71.6 | +0.6 |
| Liberal | Simon Pointer | 6,600 | 28.4 | −0.6 |
| Labor hold | | Swing | +0.6 | |

2004 Queensland state election: Ipswich
| Party | Candidate | Votes | % | ±% |
|---|---|---|---|---|
| Labor | Rachel Nolan | 15,775 | 64.2 | +14.4 |
| Liberal | Bob Harper | 6,247 | 25.4 | +14.7 |
| Greens | Clare Rudkin | 1,590 | 6.5 | +3.9 |
| Independent | Colene Hughes | 947 | 3.9 | +3.9 |
| Total formal votes | | 24,559 | 97.9 | −0.5 |
| Informal votes | | 530 | 2.1 | +0.5 |
| Turnout | | 25,089 | 93.3 | −1.0 |
Two-party-preferred result
| Labor | Rachel Nolan | 16,326 | 71.0 | +4.2 |
| Liberal | Bob Harper | 6,668 | 29.0 | +29.0 |
| Labor hold | | Swing | +4.2 | |

2001 Queensland state election: Ipswich
| Party | Candidate | Votes | % | ±% |
|---|---|---|---|---|
| Labor | Rachel Nolan | 12,282 | 49.8 | +4.2 |
| One Nation | Rita Magnussen | 5,237 | 21.2 | −17.9 |
| Liberal | Maria Forbes | 2,641 | 10.7 | +1.6 |
| Independent | Trevor Nardi | 2,200 | 8.9 | +8.9 |
| Independent | Noel Jaenke | 1,303 | 5.3 | +5.3 |
| Greens | Desiree Mahoney | 642 | 2.6 | −0.2 |
| City Country Alliance | Mike Atkin | 243 | 1.0 | +1.0 |
| Independent | Don Cameron | 107 | 0.4 | +0.4 |
| Total formal votes | | 24,655 | 98.4 | |
| Informal votes | | 410 | 1.6 | |
| Turnout | | 25,065 | 94.3 | |
Two-candidate-preferred result
| Labor | Rachel Nolan | 14,029 | 66.8 | +13.8 |
| One Nation | Rita Magnussen | 6,985 | 33.2 | −13.8 |
| Labor hold | | Swing | +13.8 | |

=== Elections in the 1990s ===
1998 Queensland state election: Ipswich
| Party | Candidate | Votes | % | ±% |
|---|---|---|---|---|
| Labor | David Hamill | 9,601 | 45.8 | −5.9 |
| One Nation | Heather Hill | 8,281 | 39.5 | +39.5 |
| Liberal | Steve Wilson | 2,207 | 10.5 | −27.9 |
| Greens | Desiree Mahoney | 666 | 3.2 | −4.2 |
| Reform | Peter Morris | 194 | 0.9 | +0.9 |
| Total formal votes | | 20,949 | 98.5 | +0.5 |
| Informal votes | | 315 | 1.5 | −0.5 |
| Turnout | | 21,264 | 94.1 | +0.9 |
Two-candidate-preferred result
| Labor | David Hamill | 10,690 | 53.4 | −3.0 |
| One Nation | Heather Hill | 9,323 | 46.6 | +46.6 |
| Labor hold | | Swing | −3.0 | |

1995 Queensland state election: Ipswich
| Party | Candidate | Votes | % | ±% |
|---|---|---|---|---|
| Labor | David Hamill | 10,802 | 51.7 | −9.5 |
| Liberal | Steve Wilson | 8,024 | 38.4 | +25.0 |
| Greens | Desiree Mahoney | 1,551 | 7.4 | +7.4 |
| Independent | Bill Yabsley | 524 | 2.5 | +2.5 |
| Total formal votes | | 20,901 | 98.0 | +0.8 |
| Informal votes | | 432 | 2.0 | −0.8 |
| Turnout | | 21,333 | 93.2 | |
Two-party-preferred result
| Labor | David Hamill | 11,423 | 56.4 | −11.3 |
| Liberal | Steve Wilson | 8,815 | 43.6 | +11.3 |
| Labor hold | | Swing | −11.3 | |

1992 Queensland state election: Ipswich
| Party | Candidate | Votes | % | ±% |
|---|---|---|---|---|
| Labor | David Hamill | 12,876 | 61.2 | −3.9 |
| National | Bob Pollock | 3,431 | 16.3 | +15.9 |
| Liberal | Shane Moon | 2,815 | 13.4 | −17.2 |
| Indigenous Peoples | Kenny Dalton | 1,237 | 5.9 | +5.9 |
| National | John Coyle | 677 | 3.2 | +3.2 |
| Total formal votes | | 21,036 | 97.2 | |
| Informal votes | | 606 | 2.8 | |
| Turnout | | 21,642 | 93.0 | |
Two-party-preferred result
| Labor | David Hamill | 13,505 | 67.8 | +1.5 |
| National | Bob Pollock | 6,421 | 32.2 | +32.2 |
| Labor hold | | Swing | +1.5 | |

=== Elections in the 1980s ===
1989 Queensland state election: Ipswich
| Party | Candidate | Votes | % | ±% |
|---|---|---|---|---|
| Labor | David Hamill | 12,784 | 66.3 | +7.5 |
| Liberal | Ian Vagg | 5,597 | 29.0 | +11.3 |
| Independent | Don McNabb | 896 | 4.7 | +4.7 |
| Total formal votes | | 19,277 | 97.7 | −0.3 |
| Informal votes | | 450 | 2.3 | +0.3 |
| Turnout | | 19,727 | 93.2 | +0.4 |
Two-party-preferred result
| Labor | David Hamill | 13,070 | 67.8 | +4.1 |
| Liberal | Ian Vagg | 6,207 | 32.2 | −4.1 |
| Labor hold | | Swing | +4.1 | |

1986 Queensland state election: Ipswich
| Party | Candidate | Votes | % | ±% |
|---|---|---|---|---|
| Labor | David Hamill | 10,740 | 58.8 | +4.3 |
| National | Michael Byrnes | 4,294 | 23.5 | +0.2 |
| Liberal | Janice Akroyd | 3,243 | 17.7 | −3.6 |
| Total formal votes | | 18,277 | 98.0 | |
| Informal votes | | 369 | 2.0 | |
| Turnout | | 18,646 | 92.8 | |
Two-party-preferred result
| Labor | David Hamill | 11,642 | 63.7 | +3.0 |
| National | Michael Byrnes | 6,635 | 36.3 | −3.0 |
| Labor hold | | Swing | +3.0 | |

1983 Queensland state election: Ipswich
| Party | Candidate | Votes | % | ±% |
|---|---|---|---|---|
| Labor | David Hamill | 8,941 | 54.5 | +13.1 |
| National | William Hayes | 3,830 | 23.3 | +23.3 |
| Liberal | Graham Cruickshank | 3,500 | 21.3 | −32.2 |
| Independent | Victor Robb | 146 | 0.9 | +0.9 |
| Total formal votes | | 16,417 | 99.0 | +0.3 |
| Informal votes | | 173 | 1.0 | −0.3 |
| Turnout | | 16,590 | 93.5 | +1.7 |
Two-party-preferred result
| Labor | David Hamill | 9,796 | 59.7 | +14.8 |
| National | William Hayes | 6,621 | 40.3 | +40.3 |
| Labor gain from Liberal | | Swing | +14.8 | |

1980 Queensland state election: Ipswich
| Party | Candidate | Votes | % | ±% |
|---|---|---|---|---|
| Liberal | Llew Edwards | 8,319 | 53.5 | −0.7 |
| Labor | Joseph Sciacca | 6,434 | 41.4 | −4.5 |
| Independent | James Hayden | 576 | 3.7 | +3.7 |
| International Socialist | Ian Rintoul | 108 | 0.7 | +0.7 |
| National Front | Victor Robb | 103 | 0.7 | +0.7 |
| Total formal votes | | 15,540 | 98.7 | +0.2 |
| Informal votes | | 201 | 1.3 | −0.2 |
| Turnout | | 15,741 | 91.8 | −1.6 |
Two-party-preferred result
| Liberal | Llew Edwards | 8,566 | 55.1 | +0.9 |
| Labor | Joseph Sciacca | 6,974 | 44.9 | −0.9 |
| Liberal hold | | Swing | +0.9 | |

=== Elections in the 1970s ===
1977 Queensland state election: Ipswich
| Party | Candidate | Votes | % | ±% |
|---|---|---|---|---|
| Liberal | Llew Edwards | 8,144 | 54.1 | −12.1 |
| Labor | Joseph Sciacca | 6,895 | 45.9 | +16.4 |
| Total formal votes | | 15,039 | 98.5 | |
| Informal votes | | 224 | 1.5 | |
| Turnout | | 15,263 | 93.4 | |
| Liberal hold | | Swing | −13.3 | |

1974 Queensland state election: Ipswich
| Party | Candidate | Votes | % | ±% |
|---|---|---|---|---|
| Liberal | Llew Edwards | 8,913 | 66.2 | +27.4 |
| Labor | John Kinnane | 3,968 | 29.5 | −15.8 |
| Queensland Labor | Francis Carroll | 399 | 3.0 | −1.8 |
| Socialist | Gregory Welsby | 175 | 1.3 | +1.3 |
| Total formal votes | | 13,455 | 98.7 | +0.9 |
| Informal votes | | 179 | 1.3 | −0.9 |
| Turnout | | 13,634 | 93.4 | +0.3 |
Two-party-preferred result
| Liberal | Llew Edwards | 9,299 | 69.1 | +17.9 |
| Labor | John Kinnane | 4,156 | 30.9 | −17.9 |
| Liberal hold | | Swing | +17.9 | |

1972 Queensland state election: Ipswich
| Party | Candidate | Votes | % | ±% |
|---|---|---|---|---|
| Labor | Phillip Dwyer | 5,446 | 45.3 | |
| Liberal | Llew Edwards | 4,674 | 38.8 | |
| Independent | Douglas Wood | 951 | 7.9 | |
| Queensland Labor | Francis Carroll | 578 | 4.8 | |
| Independent | David Laird | 340 | 2.8 | |
| Independent | Victor Robb | 47 | 0.4 | |
| Total formal votes | | 12,036 | 97.8 | |
| Informal votes | | 271 | 2.2 | |
| Turnout | | 12,307 | 93.1 | |
Two-party-preferred result
| Liberal | Llew Edwards | 6,159 | 51.2 | +5.7 |
| Labor | Phillip Dwyer | 5,877 | 48.8 | −5.7 |
| Liberal gain from Labor | | Swing | +5.7 | |

=== Elections in the 1950s ===
1957 Queensland state election: Ipswich
| Party | Candidate | Votes | % | ±% |
|---|---|---|---|---|
| Labor | Ivor Marsden | 4,320 | 45.6 | −15.6 |
| Liberal | Wylie Gibbs | 3,179 | 33.5 | −4.3 |
| Queensland Labor | Robert Johnstone | 1,982 | 20.9 | +20.9 |
| Total formal votes | | 9,481 | 99.4 | +0.2 |
| Informal votes | | 54 | 0.6 | −0.2 |
| Turnout | | 9,535 | 95.1 | +1.2 |
| Labor hold | | Swing | −4.2 | |

1956 Queensland state election: Ipswich
| Party | Candidate | Votes | % | ±% |
|---|---|---|---|---|
| Labor | Ivor Marsden | 5,689 | 61.2 | −33.4 |
| Liberal | Wylie Gibbs | 3,514 | 37.8 | +37.8 |
| Communist | Mev Welsby | 93 | 1.0 | −4.4 |
| Total formal votes | | 9,296 | 99.2 | +4.6 |
| Informal votes | | 74 | 0.8 | −4.6 |
| Turnout | | 9,370 | 93.9 | +0.6 |
| Labor hold | | Swing | N/A | |

1953 Queensland state election: Ipswich
| Party | Candidate | Votes | % | ±% |
|---|---|---|---|---|
| Labor | Ivor Marsden | 8,090 | 94.6 | +30.6 |
| Communist | Richard Cobb | 463 | 5.4 | +5.4 |
| Total formal votes | | 8,553 | 94.6 | −4.4 |
| Informal votes | | 492 | 5.4 | +4.4 |
| Turnout | | 9,045 | 93.3 | +3.2 |
| Labor hold | | Swing | N/A | |

1950 Queensland state election: Ipswich
| Party | Candidate | Votes | % | ±% |
|---|---|---|---|---|
| Labor | Ivor Marsden | 5,778 | 64.0 | |
| Liberal | Ralph Sherrington | 3,249 | 36.0 | |
| Total formal votes | | 9,027 | 99.0 | |
| Informal votes | | 87 | 1.0 | |
| Turnout | | 9,114 | 95.3 | |
| Labor hold | | Swing | | |

=== Elections in the 1940s ===
Ipswich state by-election, 1949
| Party | Candidate | Votes | % | ±% |
|---|---|---|---|---|
| Labor | Ivor Marsden | 6,021 | 53.32 | –8.61 |
| Liberal | Graham Stephenson | 4,906 | 43.45 | +5.39 |
| Communist | Edmund Crisp | 364 | 3.22 | +3.22 |
| Total formal votes | | 11,311 | 99.36 | +0.43 |
| Informal votes | | 73 | 0.64 | –0.43 |
| Turnout | | 11,384 | 92.77 | +1.33 |
| Labor hold | | Swing | –8.61 | |

1947 Queensland state election: Ipswich
| Party | Candidate | Votes | % | ±% |
|---|---|---|---|---|
| Labor | David Gledson | 7,039 | 61.9 | −38.1 |
| People's Party | Harry Shapcott | 4,326 | 38.1 | +38.1 |
| Total formal votes | | 11,365 | 98.9 | |
| Informal votes | | 123 | 1.1 | |
| Turnout | | 11,488 | 91.4 | |
| Labor hold | | Swing | N/A | |

1944 Queensland state election: Ipswich
| Party | Candidate | Votes | % | ±% |
|---|---|---|---|---|
| Labor | David Gledson | unopposed | | |
| Labor hold | | Swing | | |

1941 Queensland state election: Ipswich
| Party | Candidate | Votes | % | ±% |
|---|---|---|---|---|
| Labor | David Gledson | 6,630 | 66.8 | +0.8 |
| Country | John Cantwell | 2,534 | 25.5 | +25.5 |
| Communist | Merv Welsby | 756 | 7.6 | +7.6 |
| Total formal votes | | 9,920 | 98.3 | −0.1 |
| Informal votes | | 171 | 1.7 | +0.1 |
| Turnout | | 10,091 | 95.1 | −0.8 |
| Labor hold | | Swing | +6.3 | |

=== Elections in the 1930s ===
1938 Queensland state election: Ipswich
| Party | Candidate | Votes | % | ±% |
|---|---|---|---|---|
| Labor | David Gledson | 6,289 | 66.0 | −34.0 |
| United Australia | Henry Beverley | 3,235 | 34.0 | +34.0 |
| Total formal votes | | 9,524 | 98.4 | |
| Informal votes | | 150 | 1.6 | |
| Turnout | | 9,674 | 95.9 | |
| Labor hold | | Swing | N/A | |

1935 Queensland state election: Ipswich
| Party | Candidate | Votes | % | ±% |
|---|---|---|---|---|
| Labor | David Gledson | unopposed | | |
| Labor hold | | Swing | | |

1932 Queensland state election: Ipswich
| Party | Candidate | Votes | % | ±% |
|---|---|---|---|---|
| Labor | David Gledson | 5,081 | 59.3 | |
| CPNP | James Walker | 3,492 | 40.7 | |
| Total formal votes | | 8,573 | 99.1 | |
| Informal votes | | 74 | 0.9 | |
| Turnout | | 8,647 | 95.8 | |
| Labor gain from CPNP | | Swing | | |

=== Elections in the 1920s ===
1929 Queensland state election: Ipswich
| Party | Candidate | Votes | % | ±% |
|---|---|---|---|---|
| CPNP | James Walker | 3,968 | 56.9 | +13.1 |
| Labor | David Gledson | 3,010 | 43.1 | −13.1 |
| Total formal votes | | 6,978 | 98.5 | −0.3 |
| Informal votes | | 104 | 1.5 | +0.3 |
| Turnout | | 7,082 | | |
| CPNP gain from Labor | | Swing | +13.1 | |

1926 Queensland state election: Ipswich
| Party | Candidate | Votes | % | ±% |
|---|---|---|---|---|
| Labor | David Gledson | 3,702 | 56.2 | +1.5 |
| CPNP | Alfred Stephenson | 2,880 | 43.8 | −1.5 |
| Total formal votes | | 6,582 | 98.8 | −0.7 |
| Informal votes | | 81 | 1.2 | +0.7 |
| Turnout | | 6,663 | 92.5 | +1.8 |
| Labor hold | | Swing | +1.5 | |

1923 Queensland state election: Ipswich
| Party | Candidate | Votes | % | ±% |
|---|---|---|---|---|
| Labor | David Gledson | 3,346 | 54.7 | −1.7 |
| United | James Bottomley | 2,770 | 45.3 | +1.7 |
| Total formal votes | | 6,116 | 99.5 | +0.3 |
| Informal votes | | 31 | 0.5 | −0.3 |
| Turnout | | 6,147 | 90.7 | +1.9 |
| Labor hold | | Swing | −1.7 | |

1920 Queensland state election: Ipswich
| Party | Candidate | Votes | % | ±% |
|---|---|---|---|---|
| Labor | David Gledson | 3,336 | 56.4 | −0.1 |
| National | James Bottomley | 2,576 | 43.6 | +0.1 |
| Total formal votes | | 5,912 | 99.2 | +0.5 |
| Informal votes | | 48 | 0.8 | −0.5 |
| Turnout | | 5,960 | 88.8 | +0.4 |
| Labor hold | | Swing | −0.1 | |

=== Elections in the 1910s ===
1918 Queensland state election: Ipswich
| Party | Candidate | Votes | % | ±% |
|---|---|---|---|---|
| Labor | David Gledson | 3,161 | 56.5 | +3.1 |
| National | James Blair | 2,432 | 43.5 | −3.1 |
| Total formal votes | | 5,593 | 98.7 | −0.2 |
| Informal votes | | 71 | 1.3 | +0.2 |
| Turnout | | 5,664 | 88.4 | −3.6 |
| Labor hold | | Swing | +3.1 | |

1915 Queensland state election: Ipswich
| Party | Candidate | Votes | % | ±% |
|---|---|---|---|---|
| Labor | David Gledson | 2,706 | 53.4 | +6.5 |
| Liberal | James Blair | 2,360 | 46.6 | −6.5 |
| Total formal votes | | 5,066 | 98.9 | −0.2 |
| Informal votes | | 54 | 1.1 | +0.2 |
| Turnout | | 5,120 | 92.0 | +14.8 |
| Labor gain from Liberal | | Swing | +6.5 | |

1912 Queensland state election: Ipswich
| Party | Candidate | Votes | % | ±% |
|---|---|---|---|---|
| Liberal | James Blair | 2,145 | 53.1 | |
| Labor | William Ryott Maughan | 1,897 | 46.9 | |
| Total formal votes | | 4,042 | 99.1 | |
| Informal votes | | 35 | 0.9 | |
| Turnout | | 4,077 | 77.2 | |
| Liberal hold | | Swing | | |
