= Gooloowan =

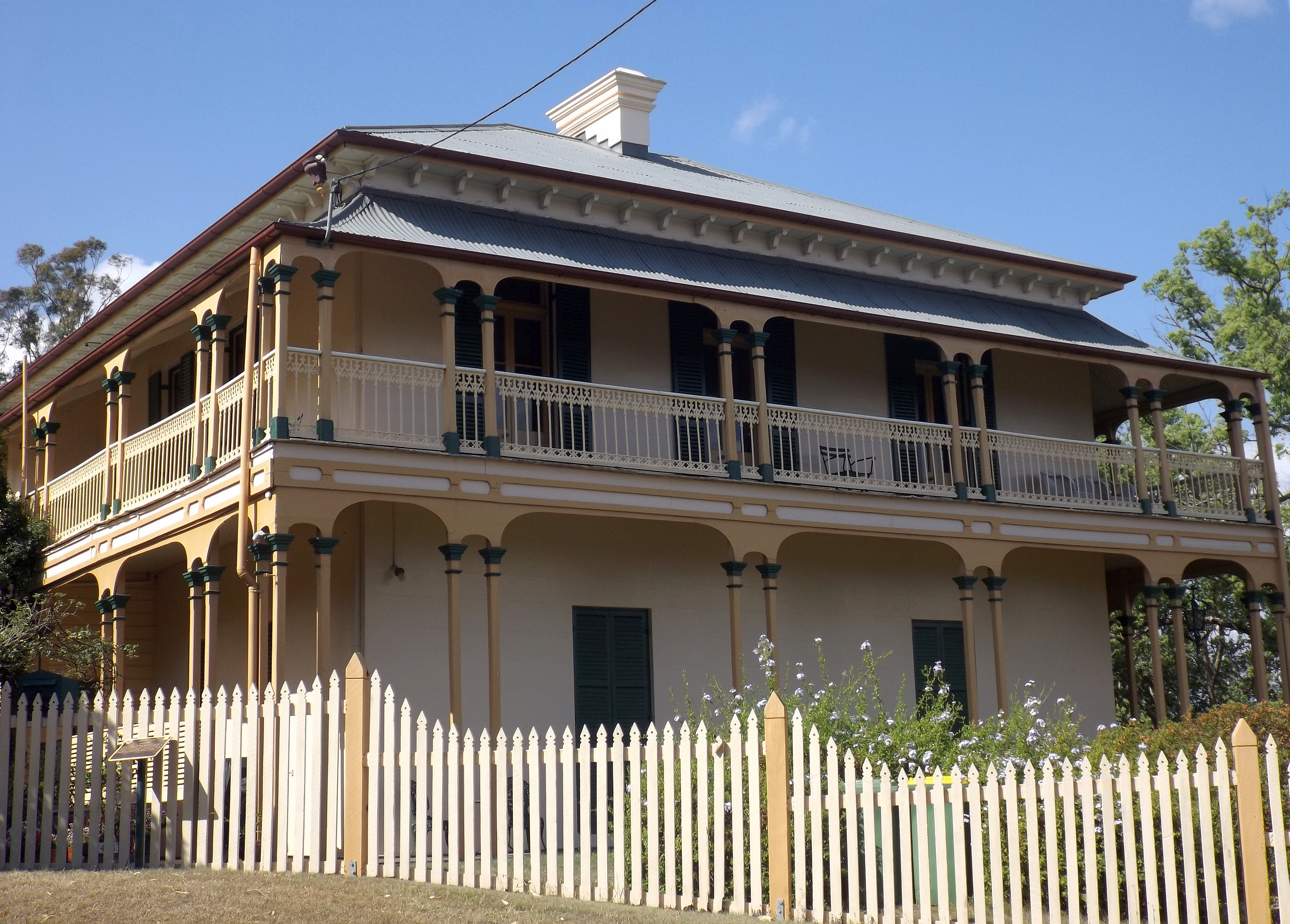
- View from Outridge Street, 2015

- Location within Queensland Location within Australia
- 27.6213°S 152.7585°E
- Location: 43 Quarry Street, Ipswich, City of Ipswich, Queensland, Australia

History
- Design period: 1840s–1860s (mid-19th century)
- Built: c. 1864– by Charles Wilson & Co

Site notes
- Architect: Charles Balding

Queensland Heritage Register
- Official name: Gooloowan
- Type: state heritage (landscape, built)
- Designated: 21 October 1992
- Reference no.: 600593
- Significant period: 1860s–? (fabric) date of render unknown 1860s–1870s (historical)
- Significant components: lead light/s, lift (English USA: elevator), billiards room, garden/grounds, library – collection, terracing, trees/plantings, service wing, gate – entrance, carriage way/drive, other – residential: component, steps/stairway, bathroom/bathhouse, residential accommodation – main house

Gooloowan is a heritage-listed villa at 43 Quarry Street, Ipswich, City of Ipswich, Queensland, Australia. It was designed by architect Charles Balding and built from c. 1864 onwards . It was added to the Queensland Heritage Register on 21 October 1992.

== History ==
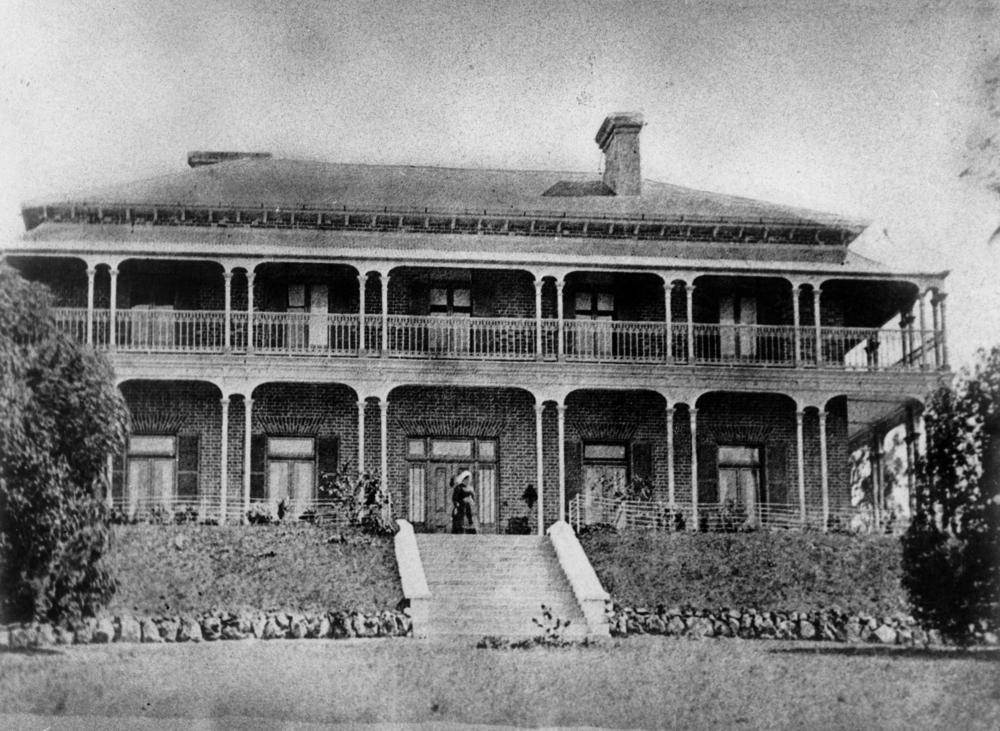
Gooloowan at Denmark Hill, Ipswich, circa 1888

Gooloowan is a two-storey rendered brick house built for Benjamin Cribb and his second wife Clarissa. The architect was Charles Balding. Tenders were called by separate trades and the work was well advanced by mid-1864.

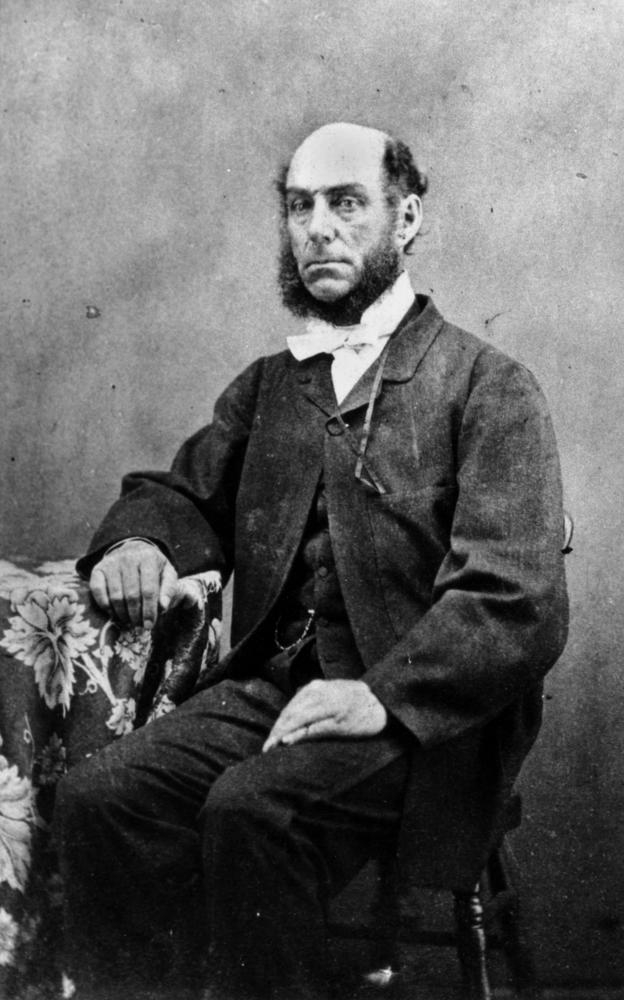
Benjamin Cribb, circa 1860

Benjamin Cribb was born in Dorsetshire, England in 1807 and came to Moreton Bay in the ship Chaseley in 1849 with his first wife Elizabeth. He started a business in Ipswich which he named "London Stores". In 1852, his first wife Elizabeth died and he moved to Brisbane. The following year, he married Clarissa Foote whose brother, John Clarke Foote, became a business partner in 1855. The following year, he returned to Ipswich. As Cribb and Foote, the firm became well known in Ipswich and the surrounding district, operating several different departments and a large mail order section from several buildings throughout central Ipswich. The firm was highly regarded for its financial support of farming families in the nearby country districts, offering loans without security other than the word of the farmer. In the 1860s and 70s, it became involved in the cotton industry and owned cotton ginneries at Churchbank near Harrisville.

Benjamin Cribb represented the Moreton Bay district in the New South Wales parliament before the Separation of Queensland in 1859 and in 1861, was elected to the Queensland Legislative Assembly. He helped found Ipswich Grammar School and his name appears prominently as a supporter of many community organisations.

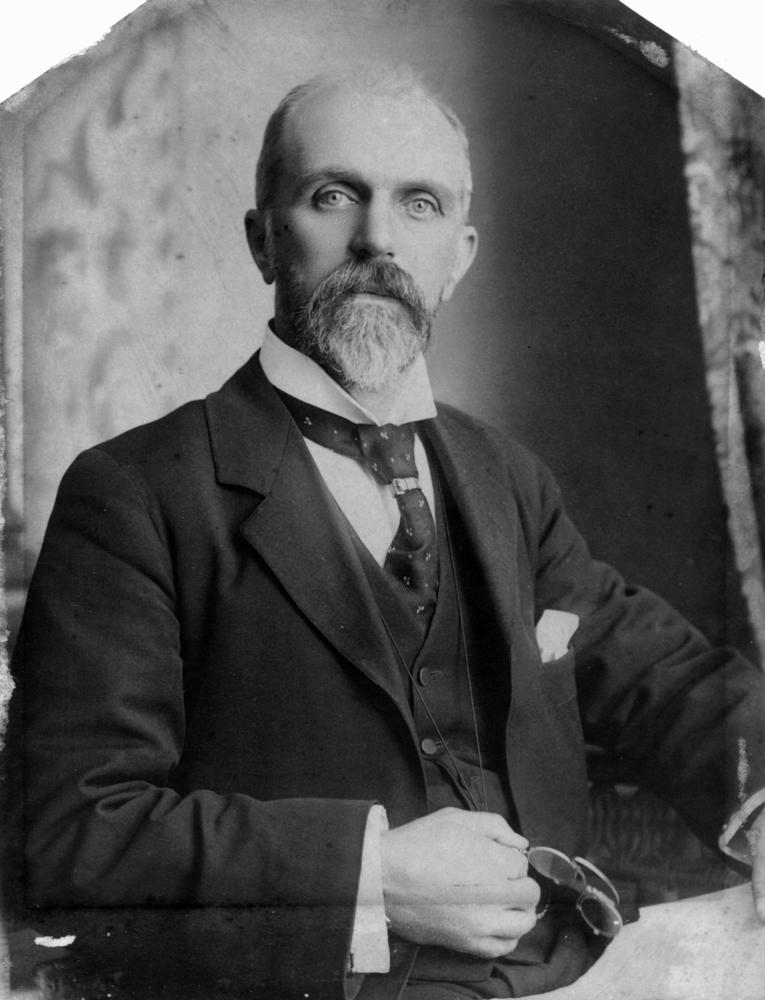
Thomas Bridson Cribb, 1901

After Benjamin Cribb's death in 1874, Gooloowan was passed down through the Cribb family and the related Walker family. The most prominent of the later occupants was Thomas Bridson Cribb who became Queensland Treasurer in 1901. The last occupant from the original family was solicitor Miss Harriet Marian Bridson Walker, who was admitted as a barrister in the Supreme Court of Queensland in 1935 (the third woman to do so).

The house was purchased by the Isbell family in 1988.

There have been few major changes to Goolowan since it was built. The brickwork was rendered, the slate roof was changed to corrugated galvanised iron and the early stables in the grounds were demolished, dates unknown. A rear verandah on the domestics wing was converted into a conservatory c. 1990, a new garage was built and the boundary fence was reinstated, supervised by Buchanan Architects.

The grounds have been reduced from the original 11 acres (4.5 ha) but the circular driveway remains with its mature camphor laurel trees, limestone rock terracing and steps to the front entry.

== Description ==
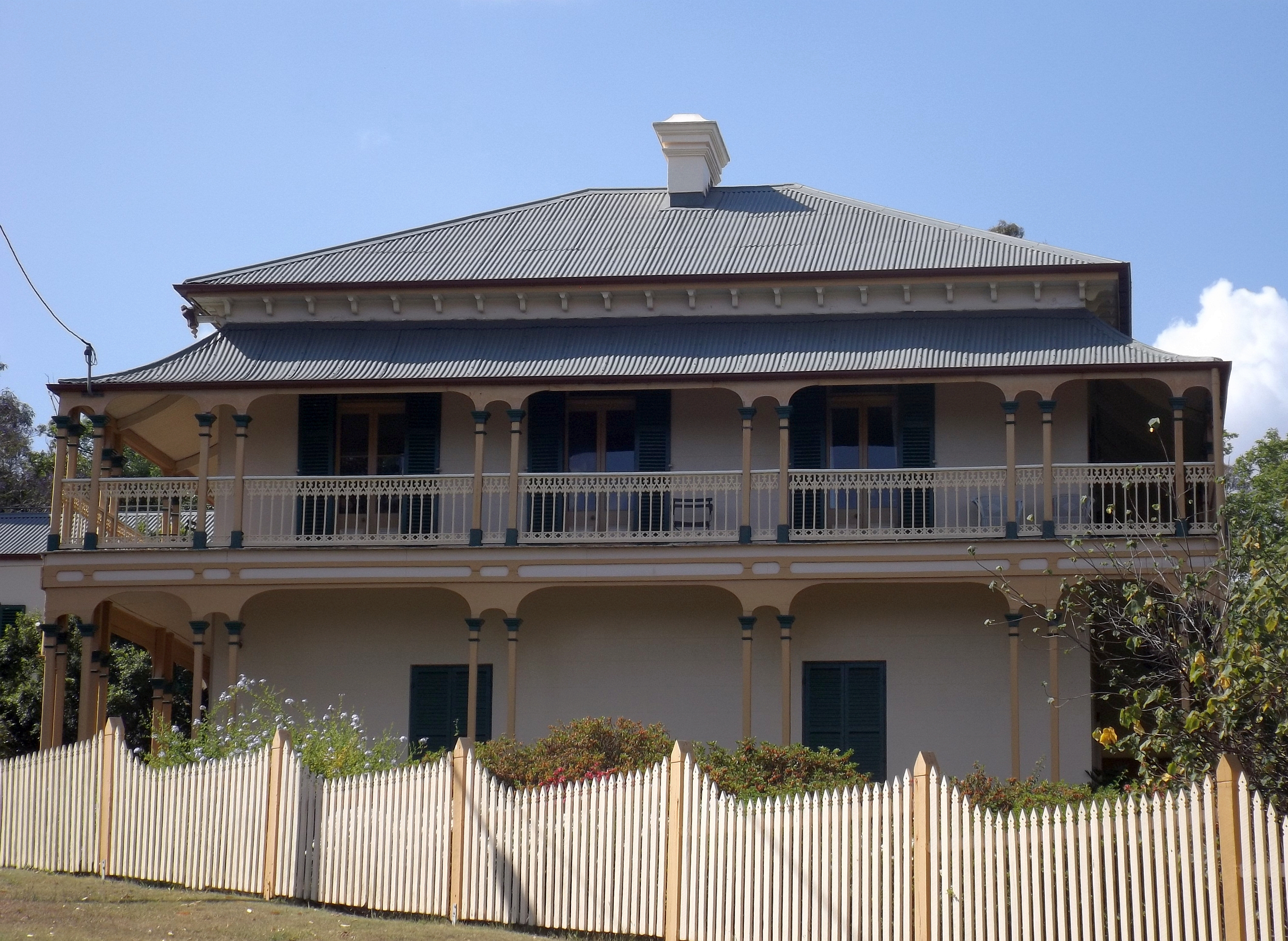
View from Quarry Street, 2015

Gooloowan is a large two-storeyed Victorian mansion standing in landscaped gardens.

The building is of load-bearing brick construction with the original facebrick external walls now rendered with ruled joints simulating stone coursing. Floors are of timber and the hipped roof, originally slated, is sheeted with corrugated galvanised iron.

Verandahs encircle the main block of the house on upper and lower levels, the upper level having cast-iron balustrading and a concave curved roof sheeted in corrugated galvanised iron. The verandahs are supported on paired timber posts extending through two storeys. Shuttered windows and French doors open from nearly all rooms onto the verandahs.

A two-storeyed service and domestics wing extends at the rear; this wing also houses the kitchen. It has no verandahs other than a simple skillion-roofed enclosure to the southern side which has been converted into a conservatory. At the western end of this wing, above an attached laundry, are two corrugated galvanised iron rainwater tanks.

Internally, Gooloowan has fine cedar joinery including the main staircase and it has rare surviving bathrooms in the main wing. Other rooms include a drawing room, dining room, library (still with many of its early books), sitting room, kitchen, pantry, conservatory and breakfast room on the ground floor. The upper floor has nine bedrooms in the main wing and two former domestics bedrooms in the rear wing. An unusual hand-operated passenger lift is on the rear verandah. Several rooms have fireplaces including some with marble chimneypieces and the ceilings in the main rooms are plaster.

There are two outbuildings - a former billiard room and a double garage which is a contemporary structure. Both are weatherboard-clad with timber floors. The front garden contains large camphor laurel and hoop pines. The property is surrounded by a tall picket fence; a pair of restored original gates give access to a circular driveway and stone entrance steps.

== Heritage listing ==
Gooloowan was listed on the Queensland Heritage Register on 21 October 1992 having satisfied the following criteria.

The place is important in demonstrating the evolution or pattern of Queensland's history.

Its surviving early fittings and relatively intact rooms such as bathrooms, library, lift and servants' quarters are important in contributing to an understanding of the daily operation of a mansion in the 19th century.

The place demonstrates rare, uncommon or endangered aspects of Queensland's cultural heritage.

Built in 1864, Gooloowan is a rare Queensland example of a substantial two-storey mansion of the 1860s.

The place is important in demonstrating the principal characteristics of a particular class of cultural places.

Its surviving early fittings and relatively intact rooms such as bathrooms, library, lift and servants' quarters are important in contributing to an understanding of the daily operation of a mansion in the 19th century.

It is associated with early architect Charles Balding and is a good example of his work.

The place is important because of its aesthetic significance.

The place demonstrates aesthetic qualities valued by the community, being a prominently-sited and handsomely-proportioned Victorian mansion set in an attractive garden.

The place has a special association with the life or work of a particular person, group or organisation of importance in Queensland's history.

The place is closely associated with Benjamin Cribb who founded the important retail firm Cribb and Foote in 1849, and with other members of the Cribb and Walker families who were notable in Queensland through their involvement in retailing, law, politics and community service.
