= Electoral district of Ipswich (New South Wales) =

Former electoral district of New South Wales, Australia

Ipswich New South Wales—Legislative Assembly
- State: New South Wales
- Created: July 1859
- Abolished: December 1959
- Namesake: Ipswich, Queensland

Ipswich was an electoral district for the Legislative Assembly in the Australian state of New South Wales created for the July 1859 election, partly replacing Stanley Boroughs and including Ipswich. It was abolished in December 1859 as a result of the separation of Queensland.

== Members for Ipswich ==
Member	Party	Period
Arthur Macalister	None	1859–1859

== Election results ==
=== 1859 ===
1859 New South Wales colonial election: Ipswich Tuesday 14 June
Candidate	Votes	%
Arthur Macalister (elected)	236	51.1
Benjamin Cribb (defeated)	226	48.9
Total formal votes	462	98.7
Informal votes	6	1.3
Turnout	468	55.7

Benjamin Cribb was the member for Stanley Boroughs.
