= 1866 Ipswich colonial by-election =

The 1866 Ipswich colonial by-election was a by-election held on 4 August 1866 in the electoral district of Ipswich for the Queensland Legislative Assembly.

== History ==
On 21 July 1866, Ratcliffe Pring was appointed Attorney-General of Queensland by Premier Robert Herbert. As such, he was required to resign and contest a ministerial by-election for his own seat of Ipswich. On 4 August 1866, he lost the seat to George McCullagh Reed.

== See also ==
- Members of the Queensland Legislative Assembly, 1863–1867
