= John Johnston (Australian politician) =

Australian politician

Member of the Queensland Legislative Assembly for Ipswich
- In office 12 August 1870 – 9 October 1872 Serving with Benjamin Cribb, John Thompson
- Preceded by: Henry Williams
- Succeeded by: Arthur Macalister

Personal details
- Born: John Johnston; 1823 Dublin, Ireland
- Died: 9 October 1872 (aged 48-49) Ipswich, Queensland, Australia
- Resting place: Ipswich General Cemetery
- Occupation: Shopkeeper

John Johnston was a politician in Queensland, Australia. He was a Member of the Queensland Legislative Assembly.

== Electorate ==
John Johnston represented the electoral district of Ipswich from 12 August 1870 to 9 October 1872.

== Early life ==
He was born in Dublin, Ireland in 1823.

== Later life ==
He was a miner in Victoria from 1853 to 1855 and then went on to establish a business in Ipswich, Queensland. He was on the committee for the Hibernian Society. John Johnston died while still in office on 9 October 1872.

Parliament of Queensland
Preceded by Henry Williams	Member for Ipswich; 1870–1872; Served alongside: Benjamin Cribb, John Thompson	Succeeded by Arthur Macalister
