= Arthur Macalister =

Australian politician (1818–1883)

Arthur Macalister CMG
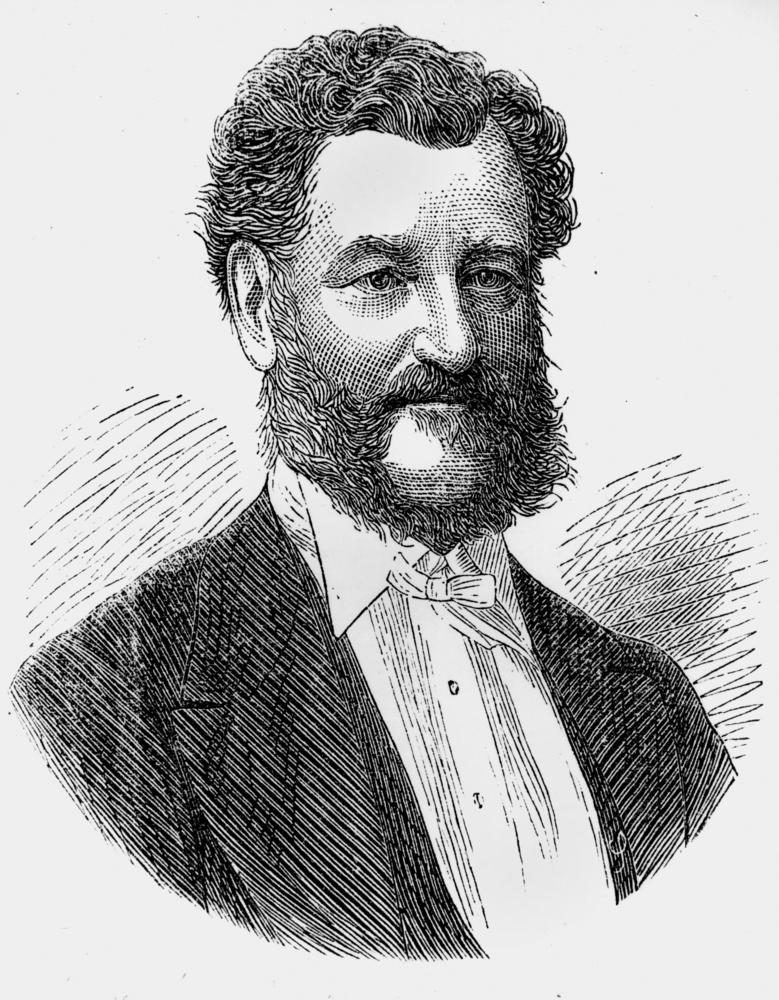

2nd Premier of Queensland
- In office 1 February 1866 – 20 July 1866
- Preceded by: Robert Herbert
- Succeeded by: Robert Herbert
- Constituency: Town of Ipswich
- In office 7 August 1866 – 15 August 1867
- Preceded by: Robert Herbert
- Succeeded by: Robert Mackenzie
- Constituency: Town of Ipswich
- In office 8 January 1874 – 5 June 1876
- Preceded by: Arthur Hunter Palmer
- Succeeded by: George Thorn Jr
- Constituency: Ipswich

Speaker of the Queensland Legislative Assembly
- In office 15 November 1870 – 21 June 1871
- Preceded by: Gilbert Eliott
- Succeeded by: Frederick Forbes
- Constituency: Eastern Downs

Member of the New South Wales Legislative Assembly for Ipswich
- In office 14 June 1859 – 10 December 1859
- Preceded by: New seat
- Succeeded by: Seat abolished

Member of the Queensland Legislative Assembly for Town of Ipswich
- In office 10 May 1860 – 18 September 1868 Serving with Frederick Forbes, Ratcliffe Pring, George Reed, John Murphy, Patrick O'Sullivan, Henry Challinor
- Preceded by: New seat
- Succeeded by: Henry Williams
- In office 22 October 1872 – 14 June 1876 Serving with Benjamin Cribb, John Thompson
- Preceded by: New seat
- Succeeded by: George Thorn Jr

Member of the Queensland Legislative Assembly for Eastern Downs
- In office 18 September 1868 – 22 July 1871
- Preceded by: John Douglas
- Succeeded by: Edmond Thornton

Personal details
- Born: 18 January 1818 Glasgow, Scotland, UK
- Died: 23 March 1883 (aged 65) Glasgow, Scotland, UK
- Spouse: Elizabeth Wallace Tassie

Arthur Macalister, CMG (18 January 1818 – 23 March 1883) was three times Premier of Queensland, Australia.

== Early life ==
Macalister was born in Glasgow, Scotland, son of John Macalister, a cabinet maker, and his wife Mary, née Scoullar. Macalister was educated in Glasgow and emigrated to Australia with his wife Elizabeth Wallace née Tassie. They arrived in Sydney on 28 September 1839 on the Abbotsford.

Macalister was appointed to the positions of clerk of Petty Sessions and postmaster at Scone, New South Wales in June 1840. In 1846 he was working for a solicitor in Sydney. In 1850 he was admitted as a solicitor and attorney.

== Political career ==
In 1859, the colony of Queensland was separated from New South Wales and Macalister became a member of its first parliament. He was appointed Secretary for Public Lands and Works in 1862, and then became premier in February 1866. He resigned in July, before again becoming premier the following month. He resigned and became chairman of committees the next year.

Macalister lost his seat in June 1871 but was re-elected for Ipswich in 1872 in a by-election. He again became premier in 1874, before resigning in 1876 and taking office as Queensland's agent-general in London.

== Later life ==
Macalister's retired in 1881. He was created Companion of the Order of St Michael and St George in 1876.

Macalister died near Glasgow on 23 March 1883 at the age of 65. He was survived by his wife, who died 14 September 1894.

== Family ==
Macalister married Elizabeth Wallace Tassie in Edinburgh, Scotland with whom he had 9 children.

== Legacy ==
A number of street names in the Brisbane suburb of Carina Heights are identical to the surnames of former Members of the Queensland Legislative Assembly. One of these is Macalister Street.

The electoral district of Macalister created in the 2017 Queensland state electoral redistribution was named after him.

The Macalister Range along the Far North Queensland coast between Cairns and Port Douglas was named in honour of the Premier by George Augustus Frederick Elphinstone Dalrymple during the 1873 ‘Queensland North-East Coast Expedition. The range name is also used for a locality in Far North Queensland and Macalister Range National Park.

The township of Macalister on the Western Darling Downs was named after him.

== See also ==
- Members of the Queensland Legislative Assembly, 1860–1863; 1863–1867; 1867–1868; 1868–1870; 1870–1871; 1871–1873; 1873–1878

Political offices
Preceded by Robert Herbert	Premier of Queensland; 1866	Succeeded by Robert Herbert
Preceded by Robert Herbert	Premier of Queensland; 1866 – 1867	Succeeded by Robert Mackenzie
Preceded by Arthur Palmer	Premier of Queensland; 1866 – 1867	Succeeded by George Thorn Jr
New South Wales Legislative Assembly
New seat	Member for Ipswich; 1859	Abolished
Parliament of Queensland
Preceded by Gilbert Eliott	Speaker of the Legislative Assembly; 1870 – 1871	Succeeded by Frederick Forbes
New seat	Member for Town of Ipswich; 1860 – 1868; Served alongside: Frederick Forbes, Ratcliffe Pring, George Reed, John Murphy, Patrick O'Sullivan, Henry Challinor	Succeeded by Henry Williams
Preceded by John Douglas	Member for Eastern Downs; 1868 – 1871	Succeeded by Edmond Lambert Thornton
New seat	Member for Ipswich; 1872 – 1876; Served alongside: Benjamin Cribb, John Thompson	Succeeded by George Thorn Jr
