= Henry Challinor =

Australian politician

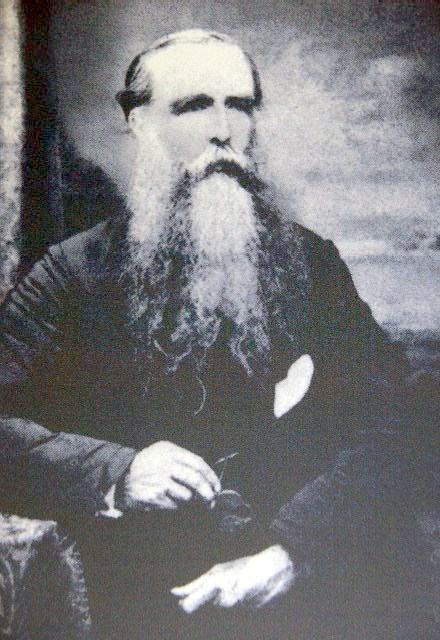

Member of the Queensland Legislative Assembly for West Moreton
- In office 12 January 1861 – 16 May 1861 (election annulled) Serving with Benjamin Cribb, Joseph Fleming
- Preceded by: Alfred Broughton
- Succeeded by: Himself
- In office 31 May 1861 – 30 May 1863 Serving with Benjamin Cribb, Joseph Fleming, Joshua Peter Bell
- Preceded by: Himself
- Succeeded by: Robert Herbert

Member of the Queensland Legislative Assembly for Town of Ipswich
- In office 30 May 1863 – 26 September 1868 Serving with Ratcliffe Pring, George Reed, John Murphy, Arthur Macalister
- Preceded by: Patrick O'Sullivan
- Succeeded by: John Thompson

Personal details
- Born: 22 June 1814 London, England
- Died: 9 September 1882 (aged 68) Brisbane
- Resting place: South Brisbane Cemetery
- Spouse: Mary Bowyer Hawkins
- Occupation: General practitioner, Mental health practitioner

Henry Challinor (22 June 1814 – 9 September 1882) was a medical doctor and politician in the Colony of Queensland.

== Early life ==
Challinor was born in London, England. Studying medicine in London, where he became a member of the Royal College of Surgeons in 1842, he emigrated to Queensland in 1849 aboard the Fortitude, on which he served as the ship's doctor. By April 1849, he had established a medical practice in Ipswich, where he later spent much of his life.

== Church life ==
Dr Challinor was a founding deacon of the Central Congregational Church of Ipswich, appointed 25 April 1853. The church was a fiercely independent denomination refusing to accept any government subsidies or land grants.

== Civic life ==
The Governor General of New South Wales appointed Henry Challinor to be a magistrate for New South Wales on 30 August 1858.

The Governor General of New South Wales appointed Henry Challinor, Esquire, J.P. to be a coroner for the District of Ipswich on 20 October 1859.

In January 1861 Dr Challinor JP conducted a magisterial inquiry into the deaths of at least three aboriginal people at Fassifern Station. He found "the said Aboriginals were wilfully and wantonly murdered on the twenty-fourth day of December last by Lieut. Wheeler and the detachment of Native Police on that day under his command; and also that John Hardie, Grazier of Fassifern was cognizant of this fact, yet endeavoured to prevent a judicial enquiry into the cause of the death of the said Aboriginals by falsely attesting that no blacks had been shot on that station as had been reported."

Subsequent to that inquiry a Select Committee was established by the Queensland Legislative Assembly to report on the Native Police Force and the Condition of the Aborigines generally. Dr Challinor MP was a witness at the inquiry.

Henry Challinor's evidence indicated his belief that Aboriginal people should be recompensed for the loss of their traditional hunting grounds. He gave evidence that he believed Aboriginal people, with the assistance of translators, should be treated equally to white people in the court system and in the area of education. When examined, he stated that he subscribed ten guineas a year towards the support of Mr Ridley as a missionary to the Aboriginal people. During his evidence on 8 and 9 May 1861 he stated:- "I must say distinctly that I consider the life of a black man to be quite as valuable in itself as that of a white man."

Dr Challinor MP wrote a letter to the Chairman of the Select Committee with his recommendations as regards a "Protective Force for the interior". This letter was attached as Appendix D. of the report.

In February 1862 Challinor examined the evidence in the cases of Billy Horton charged with rape and Kipper Billy with aiding and abetting. They were found guilty and sentenced to death. As a result of Challinor informing Justice Lutwyche of his findings, "Horton was pardoned and finally released from gaol on 2 April 1862 less than two months after his conviction. Kipper Billy, shot and killed, would have received a pardon if he had been a little more patient. A posthumous pardon has never been granted."

== Political life ==
He was elected to the Queensland Legislative Assembly in 1861 for the three member electoral district of West Moreton only to have his election annulled in May of that year. Challinor won the subsequent election and served the seat till 1863. He then moved to the seat of Town of Ipswich, where he served until he was defeated in 1868.

In 1869 Dr Challinor was appointed the second medical superintendent of the Woogaroo Lunatic Asylum at Woogaroo (Goodna) to straighten out a scandal. He left that position in 1872.

== Later life ==
At one point in his life, Challinor was an officer of the Ipswich Light Horse military unit.

Challinor died at Kangaroo Point, Brisbane not unexpected, in 1882 and was buried in South Brisbane Cemetery.

He was survived by his son Henry Binney McAll Challinor (–1926), who was the secretary to the Commissioners of Police, William Parry-Okeden and William Cahill. His son left behind a widow, two sons and three daughters.

Challinor's cousin George Miles Challinor (1832–1888) was a chemist, also emigrating on the Fortitude, before taking up land together to farm cotton. The Ipswich area plantation was named 'Yamahanto', later giving its name to the Ipswich suburb of Yamanto.

== Legacy ==
As a result of the reorganisation of Queensland mental health services in 1968, the Ipswich Mental Hospital was designated as a training centre for the intellectually disabled. In 1968 it was renamed Challinor Centre in honour of Dr Henry Challinor.

Challinor Street, Ipswich Queensland was in existence from at least 1865, and was probably named after Dr Henry Challinor, or his relative George Miles Challinor who also arrived on the Fortitude.

On 4 March 1863 a certificate was issued to Henry Challinor Esquire by Governor Sir George Ferguson Bowen. The certificate appointed Henry Challinor as the surgeon in the Ipswich Rifles that formed part of the Volunteer Corps of Queensland. It stated: "Know you, that I, Sir George Ferguson Bowen, the Captain-General and Governor-in-Chief aforesaid, Do, by virtue of the power and authority in me vested, under the Act of Council passed in the Eighteenth Year of Her present Majesty's Reign, and numbered Eight, hereby appoint you, the said Henry Challinor to be Surgeon in The Ipswich Rifles forming part of the Volunteer Corps of Queensland.". The certificate was #59 in the ‘Top 150: Documenting Queensland’ exhibition when it toured to venues around Queensland from February 2009 to April 2010. The exhibition was part of Queensland State Archives’ events and exhibition program which contributed to the state's Q150 celebrations, marking the 150th anniversary of the separation of Queensland from New South Wales.

Parliament of Queensland
Preceded by Jim Donald	Member for West Moreton; 1861; Served alongside: Benjamin Cribb, Joseph Fleming	Succeeded by Himself
Preceded by Himself	Member for West Moreton; 1861–1863; Served alongside: Benjamin Cribb, Joseph Fleming, Joshua Peter Bell	Succeeded by Robert Herbert
Preceded by Patrick O'Sullivan	Member for Town of Ipswich; 1863–1868; Served alongside: Ratcliffe Pring, George Reed, John Murphy, Arthur Macalister	Succeeded by John Thompson
