= Thomas Bridson Cribb =

Australian politician

The Hon Thomas Bridson Cribb
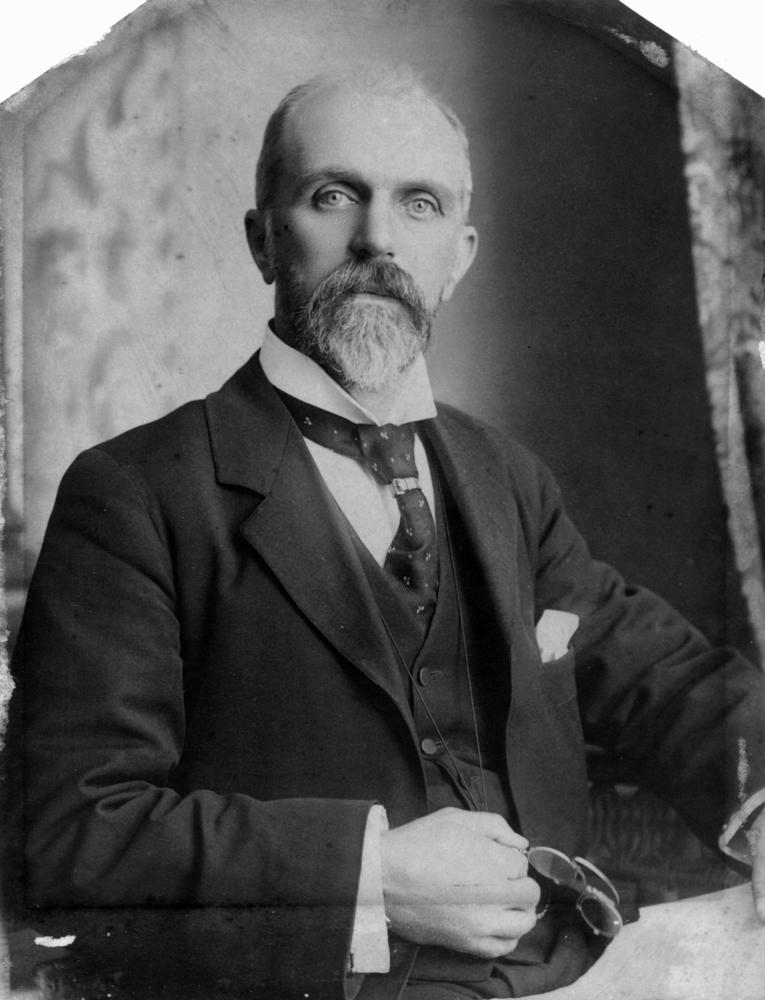

20th Treasurer of Queensland
- In office 1 February 1901 – 17 September 1903
- Preceded by: Robert Philp
- Succeeded by: William Kidston
- Constituency: Ipswich

Member of the Queensland Legislative Assembly for Ipswich
- In office 21 March 1896 – 27 August 1904 Serving with Alfred Stephenson, James Blair
- Preceded by: James Wilkinson
- Succeeded by: William Maughan

Member of the Queensland Legislative Council
- In office 23 May 1893 – 13 March 1896
- In office 14 June 1913 – 4 September 1913

Personal details
- Born: 1 December 1845 London, England
- Died: 4 September 1913 (aged 67) Southport, Queensland
- Resting place: Ipswich General Cemetery
- Party: Ministerial
- Spouse: Marian Lucy Foote (m.1874 d.1932)
- Relations: James Clarke Cribb (brother), Benjamin Cribb (father), Robert Cribb (uncle), John Clarke Foote (father-in-law), James Foote (uncle-in-law)
- Occupation: Merchant, Banker, Newspaper proprietor

Thomas Bridson Cribb (1 December 1845 – 4 September 1913) was a politician in Queensland, Australia. He was a Member of the Queensland Legislative Assembly and the Queensland Legislative Council.

== Early life ==
Thomas Bridson Cribb was born on 1 December 1845 in London, England, the son of Benjamin Cribb and his wife Elizabeth (née Bridson). He immigrated with his parents on the Chaseley arriving in Moreton Bay in May 1849.

He was educated privately and was one of the foundation scholars at Ipswich Boys' Grammar School.

He was a partner in the family retail business, Cribb & Foote

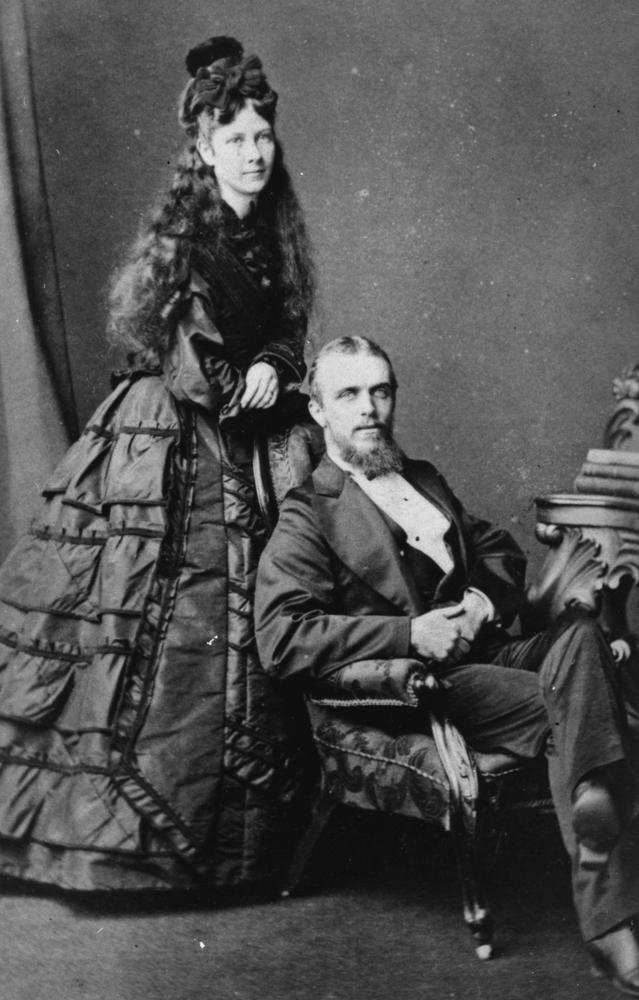
Thomas Bridson Cribb and Marion Lucy née Foote on their wedding day, 3 June 1874. The bride appears to be in mourning clothes, probably for the death of Benjamin Cribb (Thomas's father) who died in March 1874.

On 3 June 1874, he married Marian Lucy Foote, daughter of John Clarke Foote (his father's business partner in Cribb & Foote).

The Cribb and Foote families were active in Queensland politics, with Thomas's father Benjamin Cribb, his uncle Robert Cribb, his brother James Clarke Cribb, his wife's father John Clarke Foote and his wife's uncle James Foote all member of the Queensland Parliament.

== Politics ==
Cribb was appointed to the Queensland Legislative Council on 23 May 1893. Although a lifetime appointment, he resigned on 13 March 1896 to stand for election for the Legislative Assembly in the 1896 election.

As a Ministerialist, Cribb represented the electoral district of Ipswich in the Queensland Legislative Assembly from 21 March 1896, holding the seat through the 1899 and 1902 elections. From 1 February 1902 to 17 September 1903, he served as the Treasurer of Queensland. As Treasurer, he introduced income tax in Queensland in December 1902 with the Income Tax Act 1902. The tax was very unpopular, leading to Cribb being defeated in the 1904 election on 27 August by Labor candidate William Ryott Maughan.

Cribb contested Ipswich again in the 1907 election but was unsuccessful.

Cribb was re-appointed to the Queensland Legislative Council on 14 June 1913, but he was already suffering ill-health and died 3 months later on 4 September 1913.

== Later life ==
Cribb died on 4 September 1913 at his residence at Southport, Queensland, following an illness of some duration. His funeral was conducted at his home town of Ipswich and proceeded to the Ipswich General Cemetery.

== See also ==
- Members of the Queensland Legislative Council, 1890–1899; 1910–1916
- Members of the Queensland Legislative Assembly, 1896–1899; 1899–1902; 1902–1904

Parliament of Queensland
Preceded by James Wilkinson	Member for Ipswich; 1896–1904; Served alongside: Alfred Stephenson, James Blair	Succeeded by William Maughan
