= Benjamin Cribb =

Australian politician

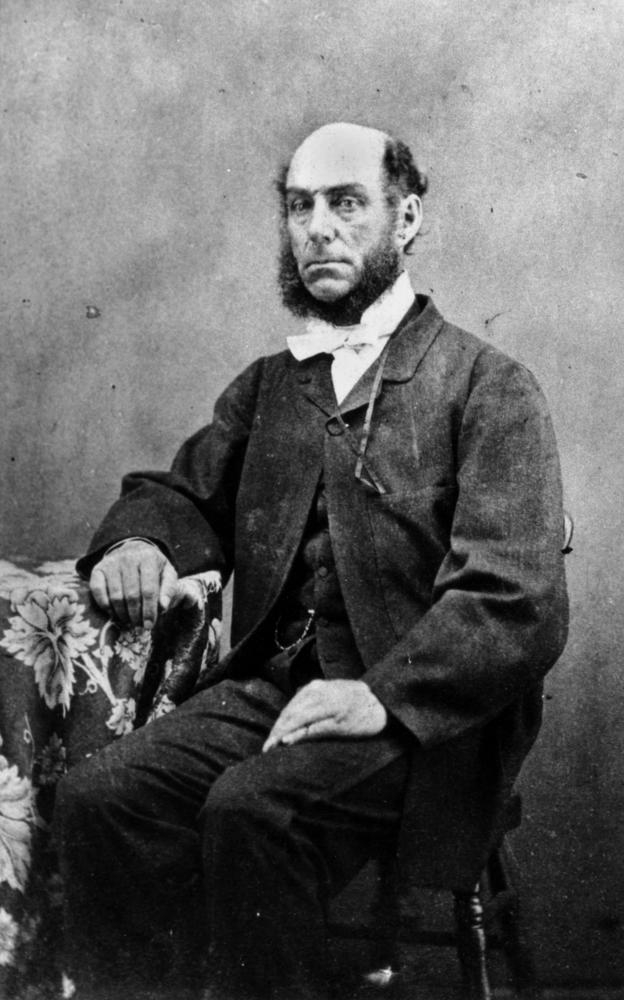

Member of the New South Wales Legislative Assembly for Stanley Boroughs
- In office 10 February 1857 – 11 April 1859 Serving with John Richardson
- Preceded by: Thomas Holt
- Succeeded by: Seat abolished

Member of the Queensland Legislative Assembly for West Moreton
- In office 26 April 1861 – 2 July 1867 Serving with Henry Challinor, Robert Herbert, Joseph Fleming, Joshua Peter Bell
- Preceded by: George Thorn, Sr.
- Succeeded by: Patrick O'Sullivan

Member of the Queensland Legislative Assembly for Ipswich
- In office 12 Aug 1870 – 14 Nov 1873 Serving with John Thompson, John Johnston, Arthur Macalister
- Preceded by: John Murphy
- Succeeded by: Seat abolished

Personal details
- Born: 7 November 1807 Poole, Dorset, England
- Died: 11 March 1874 (aged 66) Ipswich, Queensland
- Resting place: Ipswich General Cemetery
- Spouse(s): Elizabeth Brideson (1839–1852), Clarissa Foote (1853–1899)
- Relations: Robert Cribb (brother), Thomas Bridson Cribb (son), James Clarke Cribb (son)
- Occupation: General merchant, Businessman

Benjamin Cribb (7 November 1807 – 11 March 1874) was an Australian businessman and politician. He was an unaligned Member of the New South Wales Legislative Assembly for one term in 1858–1859 and a Member of the Queensland Legislative Assembly in 1861–1867 and again in 1870–1873.

== Early life ==
Cribb was born in Poole, Dorset, England into a rigidly Nonconformist family. He was educated at his mother's Dame school. Cribb's father, John Galpin Cribb, was a mariner and ship owner, operating to Newfoundland and the Mediterranean; young Benjamin and his brother Robert sometimes accompanied their father. However, this ended when their father was killed in action during the Napoleonic Wars. Following his father's death, Cribb's mother Mary Cribb (née Dirham) apprenticed Benjamin and his brother Robert to two merchants.

By 1832 Benjamin and his brother Robert had established baking and retail businesses in London. Influenced by John Dunmore Lang's description of the opportunities available in Australia, they migrated to Moreton Bay on the Chaseley arriving in May 1849.

Benjamin Cribb was married twice, in 1839 to Elizabeth Bridson (1810–1852) and in 1853 to Clarissa Kendal Foote (1825–1899). Two of his sons Thomas, and James, also served in the Queensland Parliament. His brother Robert Cribb also served in both the New South Wales and Queensland Parliaments.

== Business ==
After arriving in the Moreton Bay colony, Benjamin Cribb established a retail business in Ipswich. In about 1852, he employed John Clarke Foote as a store manager. In 1853, Benjamin Cribb married Clarissa Foote, the sister of John Clarke Foote. In 1854, Benjamin Cribb and John Clarke Foote went into partnership as Cribb & Foote, creating the major department store that stood on the corner of Bell and Brisbane Streets.

During the American Civil War he encouraged the growth and export of Australian cotton.

== Parliament ==
On 1 February 1858, Cribb was elected to represent Stanley Boroughs in the New South Wales Legislative Assembly at the 1858 election. He was a strong supporter of the separation of the colony of Queensland and opposed the use of convicts, coolies or Kanaks as cheap labour. He was defeated at the 1859 election on 11 April 1859.

After the separation of Queensland, he was elected to its Legislative Assembly. On 3 April 1861, George Thorn (senior), member for West Moreton, resigned. Benjamin Cribb won the resulting by-election on 26 April 1861. He held the seat until 2 July 1867.

He was elected in the seat of Ipswich on 12 August 1870 and held it until 14 November 1873. He did not hold ministerial or parliamentary office.

== Later life ==
Benjamin Cribb died on 11 March 1874 at his home Gooloowan in Denmark Hill, Ipswich. He was attending divine service at his local Congregational Church when he collapsed. Relatives and friends carried him home on a stretcher where he died a few moments later. His death was attributed to apoplexy of the brain. His funeral was held on 13 March 1874 where a funeral procession, one-and-a-half miles long, travelled from his home to the Ipswich General Cemetery. Present were relatives, employees, politicians and many others. Many businesses were closed for the day.

== Legacy ==
His home Gooloowan is listed on the Queensland Heritage Register.

== See also ==
- Members of the New South Wales Legislative Assembly, 1858–1859
- Members of the Queensland Legislative Assembly, 1860–1863; 1863–1867; 1870–1871; 1871–1873

New South Wales Legislative Assembly
Preceded by Thomas Holt	Member for Stanley Boroughs; 1858 – 1859; Served alongside: John Richardson	Separation of Queensland
Parliament of Queensland
Preceded by George Thorn, Sr.	Member for West Moreton; 1861–1867; Served alongside: Challinor/Herbert/Fleming & Bell	Succeeded by Patrick O'Sullivan; George Thorn, Jr.
Preceded by John Murphy; Henry Williams	Member for Ipswich; 1870–1873; Served alongside: Thompson & Johnston/Macalister	Succeeded by Arthur Macalister
