= John Malbon Thompson =

Australian politician

John Thompson

Member of the Queensland Legislative Assembly for Town of Ipswich
- In office 26 September 1868 – 14 November 1873 Serving with John Murphy, Benjamin Cribb, Henry Williams, John Johnston, Arthur Macalister
- Preceded by: Henry Challinor
- Succeeded by: Seat abolished
- In office 15 November 1878 – 27 July 1881 Serving with John MacFarlane
- Preceded by: George Thorn Jr.
- Succeeded by: Josiah Francis

Member of the Queensland Legislative Assembly for Bremer
- In office 25 November 1873 – 15 November 1878
- Preceded by: New seat
- Succeeded by: Seat abolished

Personal details
- Born: 24 December 1830 Sydney, New South Wales
- Died: 30 May 1908 (aged 77) Neutral Bay, New South Wales
- Resting place: Waverley Cemetery
- Spouse(s): Clara Georgiana Bedwell (m.1863 d.1864) Louisa Gadsden (m.1867 d.?), Mary Harriett Montague Russell (m.1896)
- Occupation: Solicitor, Barrister

John Malbon Thompson (24 December 1830 – 30 May 1908) was an Australian lawyer and politician, member of the Queensland Legislative Assembly.

== Early life ==
Thompson was the son of John Thompson, sometime Deputy Surveyor-General for New South Wales, by his marriage with the daughter of Charles Windeyer. He was born in Sydney and educated at William Timothy Cape's Grammar School.

== Career ==
Thompson was admitted an attorney and solicitor of the Supreme Court of New South Wales in 1855, and removing to Queensland, where he was admitted to the bar in June 1880, practised at Ipswich, Queensland, for which town he was returned to the Assembly in 1868. Whilst representing this constituency he was Chairman of Committees for two years, Secretary for Lands in the Arthur Palmer Ministry from May 1870 to July 1873, and Secretary for Public Works from the latter date till January 1874, when the Government retired. He was Minister of Justice and Queensland in the first Thomas McIlwraith ministry from January to May 1879. During his tenure of office as Minister of Lands he carried the Homestead Areas Bill, and did a good deal to stop the "dummying" of the State lands. Thompson wife's health worsened, he resigned from parliament on 27 August 1881 and resumed the practice of his profession as a solicitor in Sydney. Thompson married Mary Harriett Montague Russell on 9 December 1896.

Parliament of Queensland
| Preceded by Henry Challinor | Member for Town of Ipswich; 1868–1873; Served alongside: John Murphy, Benjamin Cribb, Henry Williams, John Johnston, Arthur Macalister | Abolished |
| New seat | Member for Bremer; 1873–1878 | Abolished |
| New seat | Member for Ipswich; 1878–1881; Served alongside: John MacFarlane | Succeeded by Josiah Francis |
