= Jennifer Howard (Australian politician) =

Australian politician

Jennifer Howard MP
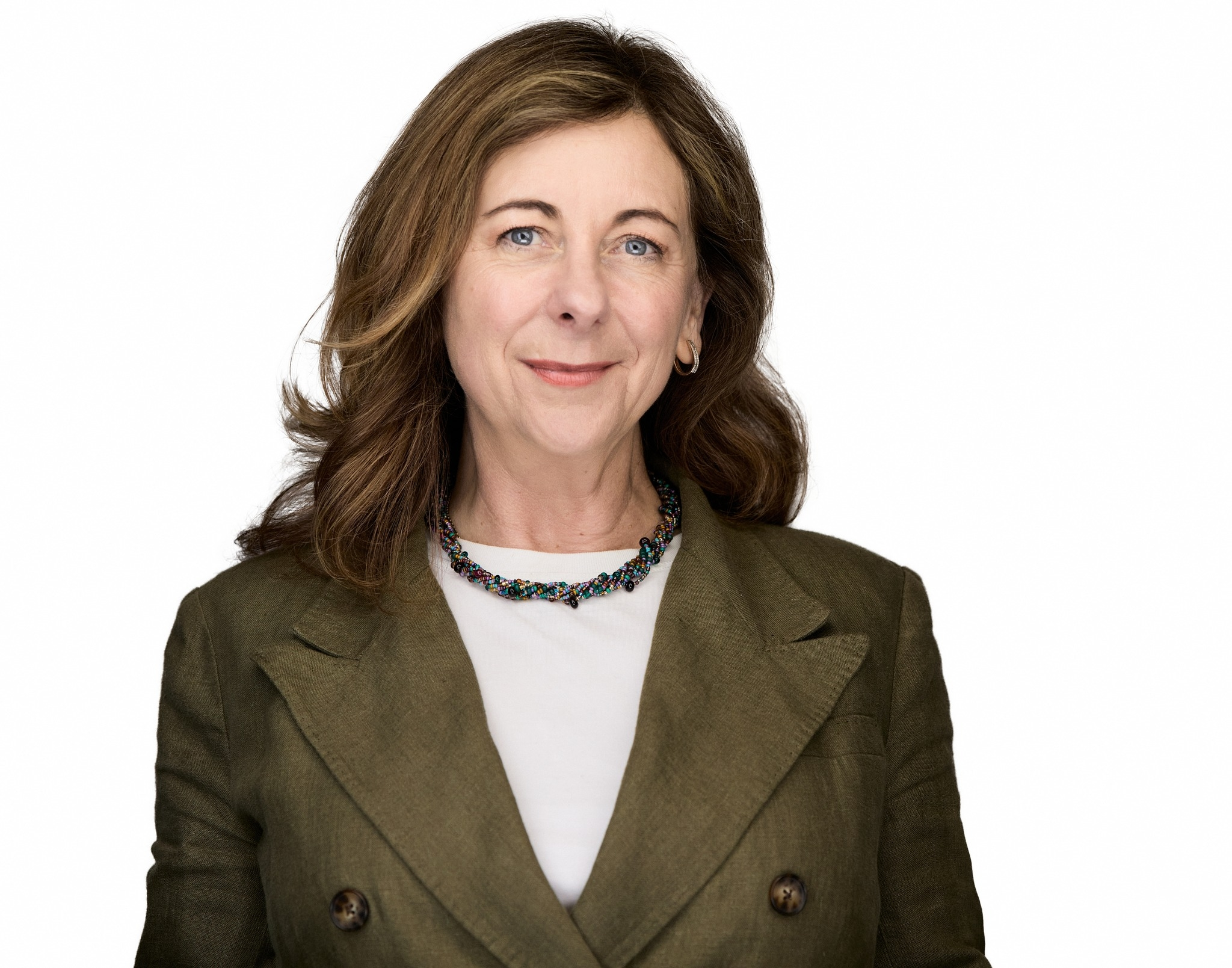
- Howard in 2022

Assistant Minister for Treasury, Trade and Investment of Queensland
- In office 18 December 2023 – 28 October 2024
- Premier: Steven Miles
- Preceded by: Charis Mullen

Assistant Minister for Veterans' Affairs of Queensland
- In office 12 December 2017 – 12 November 2020
- Premier: Annastacia Palaszczuk
- Preceded by: New portfolio
- Succeeded by: Bart Mellish

Assistant Minister of State Assisting the Premier of Queensland
- In office 11 November 2016 – 12 November 2020
- Premier: Annastacia Palaszczuk
- Preceded by: Mark Ryan
- Succeeded by: Bart Mellish

Assistant Minister for Local Government of Queensland
- In office 8 December 2015 – 11 November 2016
- Premier: Annastacia Palaszczuk
- Preceded by: New portfolio
- Succeeded by: Glenn Butcher

Member of the Queensland Legislative Assembly for Ipswich
- Incumbent
- Assumed office 31 January 2015
- Preceded by: Ian Berry

Personal details
- Born: 12 July 1965 (age 60) Mackay, Queensland, Australia
- Party: Labor
- Profession: Veterinary nurse
- Website: www.jenniferhowardmp.com.au

Jennifer Ruth Howard (born 12 July 1965) is an Australian politician. She has been the Labor member for Ipswich in the Queensland Legislative Assembly since 2015. Howard has been active in community groups such as Zonta International, school P&Cs, sporting club committees, and other community groups.

In 2005, Howard played a pivotal role in the establishment of the Ipswich Women's Development Network, a not-for-profit organisation that helps empower women in Ipswich.

== Political career ==
=== 2015 state election ===
Howard defeated Ian Berry at the 2015 Queensland state election by a margin of 65.9% to 34.1%, achieving a two party preferred swing of 20.09%.

=== 2017 state election ===
The main contenders for the seat of Ipswich at the 2017 Queensland state election were Howard (as the incumbent) and the recently dismissed One Nation Senator Malcolm Roberts. The results on polling day were clear as the former Senator was comfortably defeated by Howard, with a margin of 60.89% to 39.11%.

=== 2020 state election ===
This election saw Howard's primary vote increase to 51.8% (3.82% swing) bringing her total vote to 66.5% beating her LNP opponent Scott O'Connell at 33.5%.

=== 2024 state election ===
This election saw Howard's primary vote decrease to 42.65% (9.15% swing) bringing her total TPP vote to 60.94% beating her LNP opponent Damian Culpeper at 39.06%.

=== Parliamentary Positions ===
Howard has served as the Assistant Minister for Treasury, Trade and Investment (2023 - 2024), Assistant Minister for Veterans' Affairs and Assistant Minister of State (2017–2020), Assistant Minister of State Assisting the Premier (2016–2017), and Assistant Minister for Local Government (2015–2016). She also served as the Chair of the Ethics (2020–2024), and Chair of the Agriculture and Environment Committee (2015–2016).

Parliament of Queensland
Preceded by Ian Berry	Member for Ipswich; 2015–present	Incumbent
