= George McCullagh Reed =

Australian and New Zealand politician

George Reed
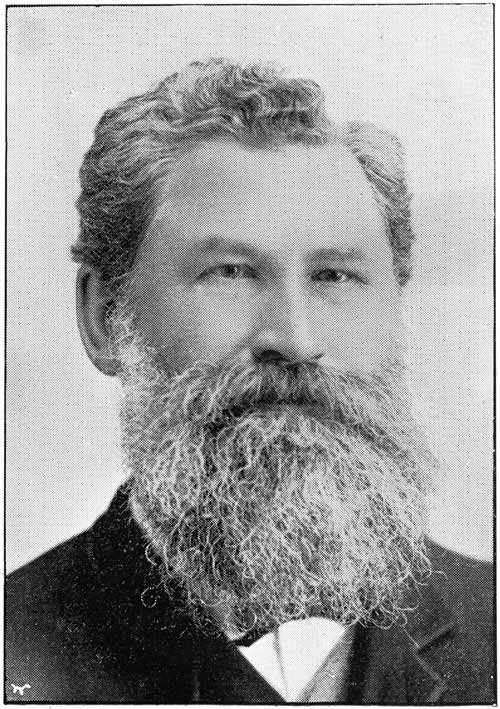

Member of the Queensland Legislative Assembly for Ipswich
- In office 4 August 1866 – 19 June 1867 Serving with Henry Challinor, Arthur Macalister
- Preceded by: Ratcliffe Pring
- Succeeded by: John Murphy

Personal details
- Born: George McCullagh Reed; 1831 County Monaghan, Ireland
- Died: 13 November 1898 (aged 65–66) Auckland, New Zealand
- Resting place: Symonds Street Cemetery
- Spouse: Jessie Chambers Ranken (m.1863)
- Education: Queen's College, Belfast
- Occupation: Journalist, Presbyterian minister

George McCullagh Reed (1831 – 13 November 1898) was a New Zealand presbyterian minister, journalist and newspaper proprietor.

Reed was born in County Monaghan, Ireland in about 1831. He received his education from Queen's College, Belfast, from where he graduated in 1856. He was ordained as a Presbyterian minister and went to France, Switzerland, and in 1857 to Victoria in Australia. From 1861, he was minister in Ipswich, Queensland, and it was there that he married Jessie Chalmers Ranken on 6 July 1863. He resigned from the ministry in 1866. Reed was elected to the second Legislative Assembly of Queensland for the district of Ipswich in a ministerial by-election on 4 August 1866 and held this seat until the end of the parliamentary term on 19 June 1867.

He set up, bought, or edited many newspapers. He set up the Evening Star in Auckland in 1870. While living in Auckland, he was elected to the Auckland Provincial Council for the Takapuna electorate, and he served from 21 November 1873 until the abolition of provincial government on 31 October 1876. He served on the executive council (10 December 1873 – 13 November 1874) and was provincial treasurer until his resignation from that post.

In 1876, he established the Evening News in Dunedin. Some months later, he purchased a morning newspaper in Dunedin, the Otago Guardian, together with George Fenwick. The city could not sustain two morning papers and Fenwick and Reed bought their rival, the Otago Daily Times and its weekly, the Otago Guardian.

After time in Ireland as New Zealand's immigration agent, he was leader writer for The Argus in Melbourne before joining The New Zealand Herald in 1883. He moved to the United Kingdom as the Herald's correspondent, and there he set up the Australian Times and Anglo-New-Zealander together with Robert Reid. Reed returned to Auckland and became editor of the Auckland Evening Bell. In 1889, he was editor of the Evening Standard in Melbourne. In the following year, he was editor for The Sydney Morning Herald. By 1895, he had returned to Auckland and rejoined The New Zealand Herald.

Reed died in Auckland of a heart attack on 13 November 1898. He was survived by three sons, including Vernon Reed and John Reed, and two daughters. He was buried in the Presbyterian section of the Symonds Street Cemetery.

== Notes ==
Parliament of Queensland
Preceded by Ratcliffe Pring	Member for Ipswich; 1866–1867; Served alongside: Henry Challinor, Arthur Macalister	Succeeded by John Murphy
