= John Murphy (Queensland politician) =

Australian politician

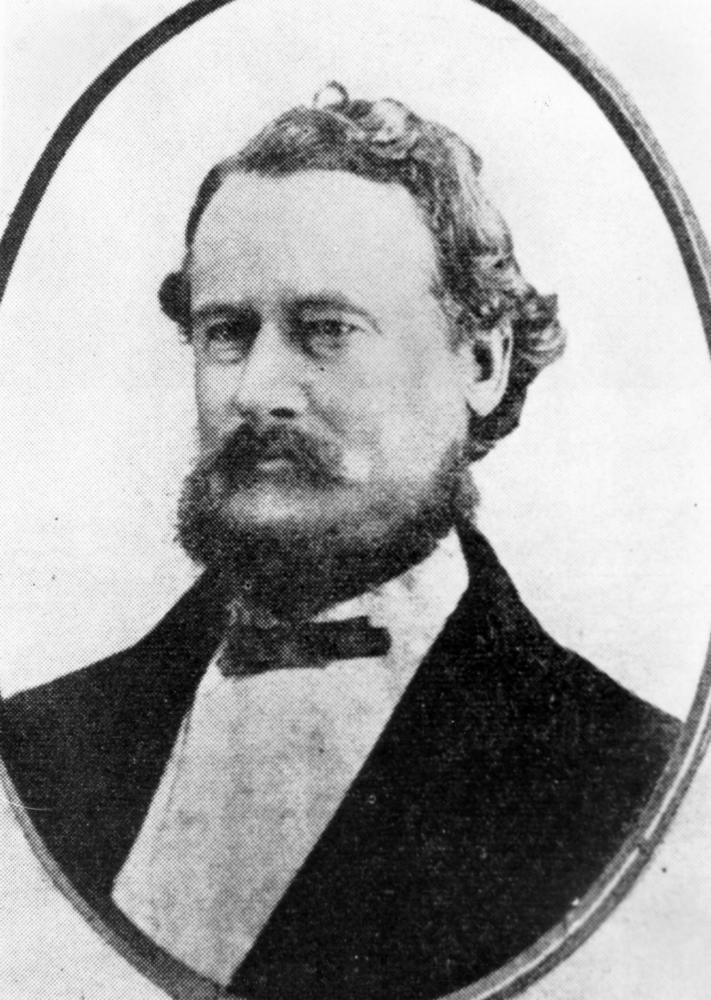

Member of the Queensland Legislative Assembly for Ipswich
- In office 19 June 1867 – 12 August 1870 Serving with Henry Challinor, Arthur Macalister, John Thompson, Henry Williams
- Preceded by: George Reed
- Succeeded by: Benjamin Cribb

Personal details
- Born: John Murphy; 25 September 1820 County Cork, Ireland
- Died: 2 March 1883 (aged 62) Roma, Queensland, Australia
- Resting place: Ipswich General Cemetery
- Spouse: Hannah Julia Smith (m.1862)
- Occupation: Merchant

John Murphy (1820–1883) was a politician in Queensland, Australia. He was a member of the Queensland Legislative Assembly, representing Ipswich 18 June 1867 to 12 August 1870.

== Early life ==
Murphy was born 25 September 1820 (County Cork, Ireland) to Daniel Jervois and Susan (née Godson). He had 4 sons and 2 daughters. He was a member of the Church of England.

== Career ==
Murphy began his career by working in a lawyer's office in Sydney before becoming a storekeeper's assistant at Muswellbrook. He arrived in Ipswich in 1852 and became manager of the mercantile firm, Walter Gray and Company, beside the Bremer River.

He then became a forwarding and commission agent then became the first Mayor of Ipswich from 1860 to 1861 and served as mayor again from 1865 to 1867. On 11 September 1861 he recommended that the council have a seal. The design is still used today.

He represented Ipswich in the Legislative Assembly of Queensland, 19 June 1867 to 12 August 1870.

Murphy was appointed police magistrate at Goondiwindi in 1872 and then at Roma in 1874.

== Later life ==
With a continuing illness from May 1882, he died on Friday 2 March 1883. Upon Murphy's death it was said that "Roma has lost one of the best Police Magistrates that the colonies have hitherto afforded".

Parliament of Queensland
Preceded by George Reed	Member for Ipswich; 1867–1870; Served alongside: Henry Challinor, Arthur Macalister, John Thompson, Henry Williams	Succeeded by Benjamin Cribb
