= David Gledson =

Australian politician

The Honourable David Gledson
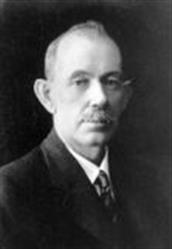

Member of the Queensland Legislative Assembly for Ipswich
- In office 22 May 1915 – 11 May 1929
- Preceded by: James Blair
- Succeeded by: James Walker
- In office 11 Jun 1932 – 14 May 1949
- Preceded by: James Walker
- Succeeded by: Ivor Marsden

Personal details
- Born: David Alexander Gledson; 1877 Saintfield, County Down, Ireland
- Died: 14 May 1949 (aged 71 or 72) Ipswich, Queensland, Australia
- Resting place: Ipswich General Cemetery
- Party: Labor
- Spouse: Susannah Jane Bird (m.1904 d.1952)
- Occupation: Accountant

David Alexander Gledson (1877 – 14 May 1949) was an accountant and member of the Queensland Legislative Assembly.

== Biography ==
Gledson was born at Saintfield, County Down, Ireland, to William Gledson, a miner, and his wife Mary (née Magill). His family arrived in Queensland in 1885 and he was educated at Bundamba State School and the Ipswich Technical College. Later in life he attended night classes to qualify as an accountant.

He went to work at the Bundamba coal mines, he was inspired by the union ideals of Gilbert Casey. Dismissed and blacklisted he next worked at the Tivoli pits. After a strike in 1905, he helped to found the Queensland Colliery Employees' Union. In 1908 he was employed full-time by the union as its secretary. His time as secretary saw a period of expansion and consolidation and in 1910 he became a district check-inspector on a programme to improve conditions in Queensland mines. Gledson represented Queensland at the 1915 meeting in Sydney which brought the Australian Coal and Shale Employees' Federation into being.

On 24 February 1904 he married Susannah Jane Bird (died 1952) at Bundamba and they had one son and two daughters. Gledson died in May 1949 after suffering a stroke. He was accorded a state funeral which proceeded from the Bundamba Methodist Church to the Ipswich General Cemetery.

== Public career ==
After being beaten James Clarke Cribb by 21 votes at the 1908 Queensland state election and 233 votes a year later for the seat of Bundamba, Gledson turned to the seat of Ipswich at the 1915 Queensland state election. His win over the sitting member, James Blair was one of the highlights for the Labor Party as it won Government in its own right for the first time. He held Ipswich until Labor's defeat in 1929, but won the seat back as Labor was returned to power in 1932. This time he remained the member up until his death in 1949.

He held several offices while Labor was in power:

- Member of the Executive Council – 1939
- Assistant Secretary for Agriculture and Stock – 1939
- Minister without Office – 1925–1926
- Secretary for Mines – 1939–1941
- Secretary for Labour and Industry – 1926–1929
- Attorney-General – 1941–1949.

In 1922, defections from the Labor Party and the refusal of the opposition to grant a pair to any absent Government members left it in a precarious position and forced the Queensland Premier, Ted Theodore, to have Gledson brought in to parliament on a stretcher, due to his having severe influenza. This enabled the speaker to have the casting vote, and Theodore had the numbers to grant an adjournment.

In 1948 there was serious industrial unrest due to the 1948 Queensland railway strike. Charges were laid against the ringleaders and three of the men arrested (E. C. Englart, Max Julius and M. Healy) refused to pay the fines they were given and elected to serve the three-month jail sentences in default. A mysterious envelope addressed to "Dave Gledson, Attorney-General" arrived at the counter of the treasury building and when opened, contained 350 pounds in 10 pound notes. The covering letter said that the payment was for "Maxy, Teddy and Mick" and implored Gledson to "let these men go back to their wives and families. This money will not do the government any good, anyway". The three men were released immediately and an investigation failed to reveal the identity of the benefactor who paid the fines.

Parliament of Queensland
Preceded by James Blair	Member for Ipswich; 1915–1929	Succeeded by James Walker
Preceded by James Walker	Member for Ipswich; 1932–1949	Succeeded by Ivor Marsden
