= Robert Herbert =

Australian politician

The Honourable Sir Robert Herbert GCB
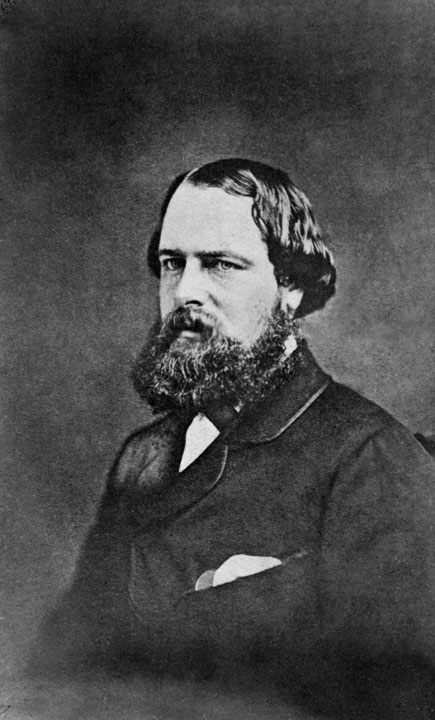

1st Premier of Queensland
- In office 10 December 1859 – 1 February 1866
- Preceded by: Position established
- Succeeded by: Arthur Macalister
- In office 20 July 1866 – 7 August 1866
- Preceded by: Arthur Macalister
- Succeeded by: Arthur Macalister

Member of the Queensland Legislative Assembly for Leichhardt
- In office 4 May 1860 – 12 June 1863 Serving with Charles Royds
- Preceded by: New seat
- Succeeded by: Gordon Sandeman

Member of the Queensland Legislative Assembly for West Moreton
- In office 13 June 1863 – 7 August 1866 Serving with Benjamin Cribb, Joshua Peter Bell
- Preceded by: Henry Challinor
- Succeeded by: Joseph Fleming

Personal details
- Born: 12 June 1831 Brighton, Sussex, England, United Kingdom
- Died: 6 May 1905 (aged 73) Ickleton, Cambridgeshire, England, United Kingdom

Sir Robert George Wyndham Herbert, GCB (12 June 1831 – 6 May 1905), was the first Premier of Queensland, Australia. At 28 years and 181 days of age, he was the youngest person ever to become premier of an Australian state.

== Early years ==
Herbert was born in Brighton, England, on 12 June 1831.

== Career in England ==
He was Assistant-Secretary to the Board of Trade. In 1870 was made Assistant Under-Secretary for the Colonies, while his relative, Henry Herbert, 4th Earl of Carnarvon, was the serving Secretary of State and, in 1871, became Permanent Under-Secretary of State for the Colonies. He held that position with great distinction for 21 years. In 1899/1900 he briefly took on the role as Acting Under-Secretary of State for the Colonies because of illness to Sir Edward Wingfield.

== Later years ==
In later years, Robert Herbert suffered from heart trouble. Believing his health would benefit from a sea voyage, he went for a cruise in the Mediterranean. He met his sister in Marseille, France, where his health worsened and he returned immediately to England. He was taken in an ambulance railway car on the Great Eastern Railway to his residence at Ickleton, Cambridgeshire, where he died on 6 May 1905.

== Personal life ==
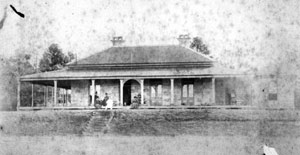
Herston House, c. 1890

Robert Herbert met his companion, John Bramston, at Balliol College Oxford University, England in the early 1850s. The pair shared rooms at Oxford, and also in London. When Herbert was Premier of Queensland, and Bramston his Attorney-General, the two created a farm on what is now the site of the Royal Brisbane and Women's Hospital. They named the farmhouse in which they both lived "Herston", a combination of their names, which is now the name of the modern day suburb.

Herbert never married, and modern historians, such as Robert Aldrich, Clive Moore, Robert French, and Garry Wotherspoon, conclude that he was likely gay. In 1864, Herbert gave this explanation as to why he had not married: "It does not seem to me reasonable to tell a man who is happy and content, to marry a woman who may turn out a great disappointment."

== Legacy ==
Herston became the name of a modern-day Brisbane suburb surrounding the site of the Royal Brisbane and Women's Hospital.

The Herbert River is located in Far North Queensland, Australia. The southernmost of Queensland's wet tropics river systems, it was named in 1864 by the explorer George Elphinstone Dalrymple after Robert Herbert.

The Queensland federal electorate of Herbert, one of the original 65 divisions contested at the first federal election, was named after him.

Governor George Bowen, Queensland's first Governor, appointed Sir Robert George Wyndham Herbert as first Colonial Secretary of Queensland before leaving England in 1859. This document was ranked #5 in the 'Top 150: Documenting Queensland' exhibition when it toured to venues around Queensland from February 2009 to April 2010. The exhibition was part of Queensland State Archives' events and exhibition program which contributed to the state's Q150 celebrations, marking the 150th anniversary of the separation of Queensland from New South Wales.

== See also ==
- Members of the Queensland Legislative Assembly, 1860–1863; 1863–1867

Parliament of Queensland
New division	Member for Leichhardt; 1860–1863; Served alongside: Charles Royds	Succeeded by Gordon Sandeman
Preceded by Henry Challinor	Member for West Moreton; 1863–1866; Served alongside: Benjamin Cribb, Joshua Peter Bell	Succeeded by Joseph Fleming
Political offices
New title	Premier of Queensland; 1859 – 1866	Succeeded by Arthur Macalister
Preceded by Arthur Macalister	Premier of Queensland; 1866	Succeeded by Robert Mackenzie
Government offices
Preceded by Sir Frederic Rogers	Permanent Under-Secretary of State for the Colonies; 1871 – 1892	Succeeded by Sir Robert Henry Meade
Diplomatic posts
Preceded by Sir Edward Braddon	Agent-General for Tasmania; 1893–1896	Succeeded by Sir Andrew Clarke
Honorary titles
Preceded by Samuel Faudel-Phillips	High Sheriff of the County of London; 1899 – 1900	Succeeded by John Verity
