= Ian Berry (politician) =

Australian Liberal National politician

Member of the Queensland Legislative Assembly for Ipswich
- In office 24 March 2012 – 31 January 2015
- Preceded by: Rachel Nolan
- Succeeded by: Jennifer Howard

Personal details
- Born: 3 November 1951 (age 74) Brisbane, Queensland
- Party: Liberal National Party of Queensland
- Profession: Solicitor

Ian Morley Berry (born 3 November 1951) is an Australian Liberal National politician who was the member of the Legislative Assembly of Queensland for Ipswich from 2012 to 2015.

== Background ==
Berry was born in Brisbane and grew up in Sherwood before moving to Ipswich in the early 1980s.

A solicitor by profession and former president of the Queensland Law Society, Berry has a long history of community service which has included serving as a trustee of Ipswich Girls Grammar School, as president of the Booval Cricket Club, as a member of the Ipswich Legal Aid Review Committee and as a patron of the Musketeers Sports Club.

Berry has also coached junior cricket and hockey teams and is a keen athlete, competing in numerous half marathons and fun runs.

Parliament of Queensland
Preceded by Rachel Nolan	Member for Ipswich; 2012–2015	Succeeded by Jennifer Howard
