= John Clarke Foote =

Australian politician

The Hon John Foote
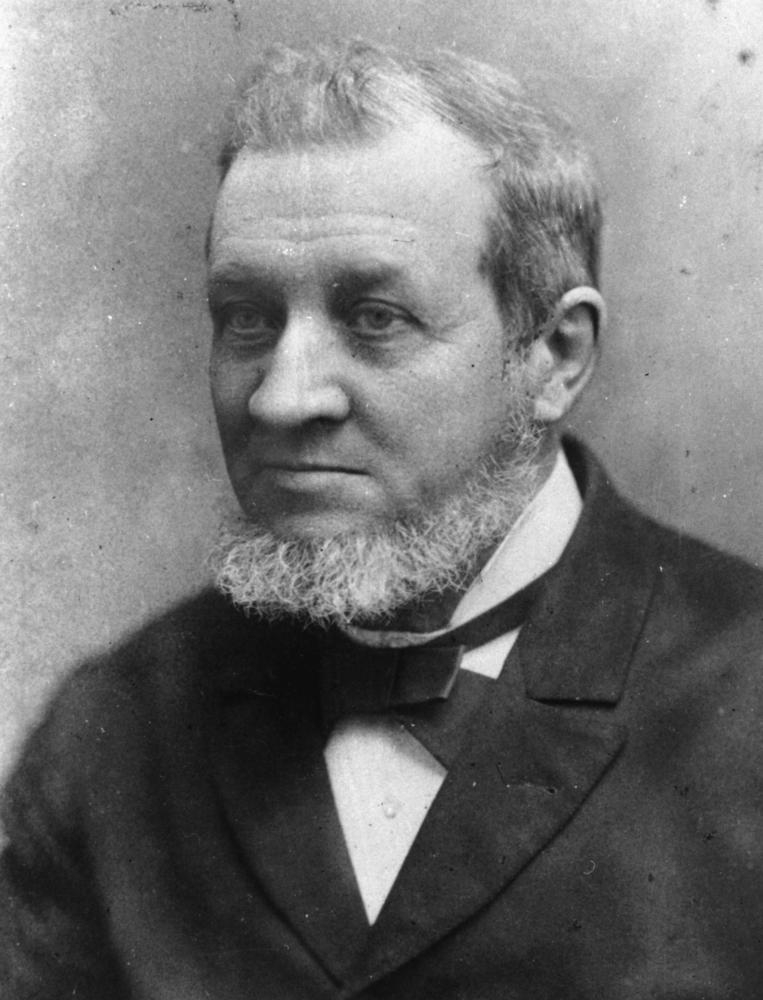

Member of the Queensland Legislative Council
- In office 12 May 1877 – 18 August 1895

Personal details
- Born: John Clarke Foote; 10 July 1822 Calne, Wiltshire, England
- Died: 18 August 1895 (aged 73) Ipswich, Queensland, Australia
- Resting place: Ipswich General Cemetery
- Spouse: Mary Ann Hardwick (d.1904)
- Relations: James Foote (brother)
- Occupation: Pastoralist, teacher, businessman

John Clarke Foote (1822–1895) was a British-born department store owner and politician in Queensland, Australia. He was a member of the Queensland Legislative Council.

== Early life ==
John Clarke Foote was born on 10 July 1822 in Calne, Wiltshire, England, the son of Joseph Foote (a hat maker) and his wife Elizabeth (née Clarke). In January 1848, his father emigrated to Van Diemen's Land (Tasmania) as an agent of the Van Dieman's Land Colonial Mission Society and was appointed the resident Independent minister at Richmond within a few weeks of his arrival. On 10 September 1848, Joseph died after being seized with an apoplectic fit while preaching the divine service.

John immigrated with his mother Elizabeth, his wife Mary Ann, his brother James and three sisters – Clarissa, Lucy and Harriet – on the Emigrant, arriving in Moreton Bay on 12 August 1850. During the voyage, there was an outbreak of typhus and around 20 people died. The ship on arrival in Moreton Bay was placed under quarantine, and was not brought into Brisbane until 28 September 1850.

== Business ==
Foote came to Ipswich in about 1852, and worked as a manager in the general store owned by Benjamin Cribb. In 1853, Cribb married Clarissa, sister of John Clarke Foote. In 1854, Benjamin Cribb and Foote went into partnership as Cribb & Foote, creating the major department store that stood on the corner of Bell and Brisbane Streets.

== Politics ==
John Clarke Foote was appointed as a lifetime Member of the Queensland Legislative Council on 12 May 1877, an appointment that ended with his death on 18 August 1895.

== Later life ==
John Clarke Foote died on 18 August 1895 at his residence on the corner of Thorn and South Streets, Ipswich, and was buried in Ipswich General Cemetery. He had been suffering from brain disease for the previous nine months and it had become acute in the previous six weeks.
