= Cribb & Foote =

- Industry: Retail
- Founded: 1849; 177 years ago
- Founder: Benjamin Cribb; John Clarke Foote
- Defunct: 1985; 41 years ago
- Headquarters: Ipswich, Queensland, Australia

Cribb & Foote was a department store in Ipswich, Queensland, Australia, that existed from 1849 until 1985. It was renamed Reid's department store in 1977.

== Early history ==
Ipswich businessman Benjamin Cribb opened a drapery store in 1849 and entered into partnership with John Clarke Foote in 1854. Trading as Cribb and Foote they established a department store in Ipswich. The original brick building was designed by architect F.D.G. Stanley, and featured light wells for natural lighting and ventilation. It was central to the early community, supporting cotton farming and other local industries. The original building suffered damage from a fire in 1865 and they established extended premises on the corner of Bell and Brisbane streets. Subsequent renovations in 1912 added a three-storey wing in Bell Street, as well as a lift, and its own electricity supply.

The store sold everything from buttons to cars. They also ran an agricultural machinery store in Nicholas Street. Cribb and Foote opened a pharmacy and smaller branches in and around the Ipswich region. They also offered a mail order service for the whole of Queensland.

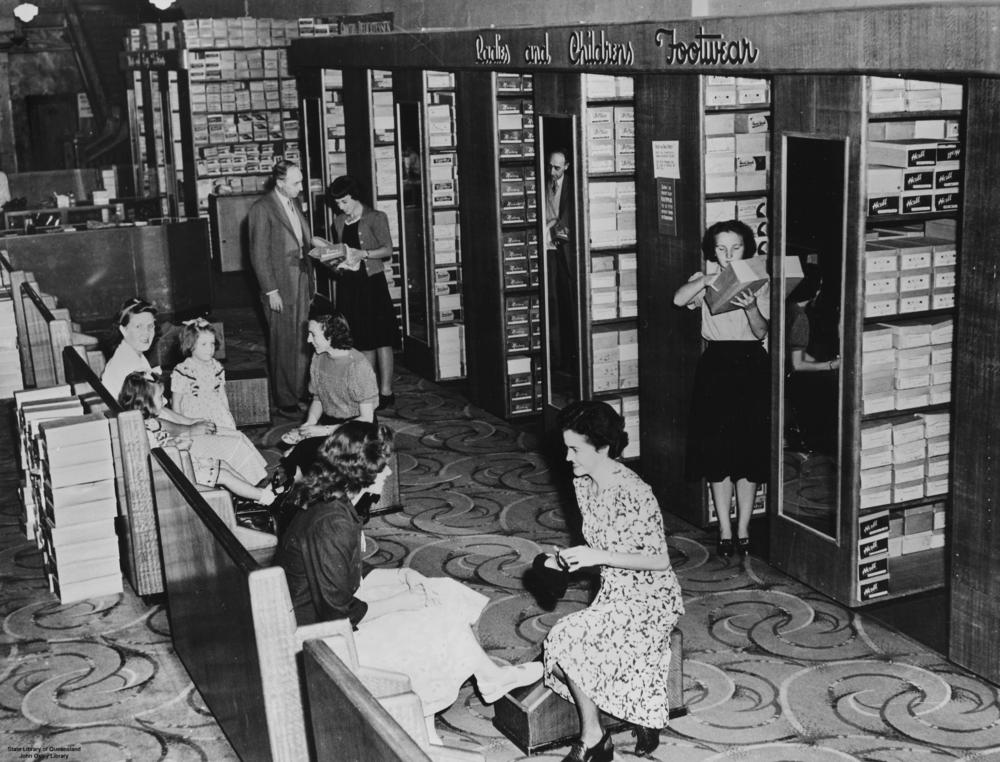
Shoe department in Cribb and Foote's Ipswich store, April 1949

== Sale to Walter Reid and Company and destruction by fire ==
Cribb and Foote was acquired by Walter Reid and Co. in 1972 and the store was renamed Reid's department store. The store was destroyed by fire on August 17, 1985. The intensity of the fire melted the clock face of the Ipswich Clock Tower. Investigations into the fire established arson but the four people charged and convicted of lighting the fire were acquitted on appeal. No-one was subsequently tried. The loss of Reid's led to a downturn in trade within the city.

The Kern corporation took over the development of the site in 1986 to establish Ipswich City Square. Reid's operated out of the Town Hall for some time after the destruction of the store before closing permanently.

== Legacy ==
The Memorial gates at the hockey grounds in Chermside Road, East Ipswich were a centenary gift to Ipswich from the Cribb and Foote firm.

Descendants of the Foote family now own Foote's Pharmacies, a pharmacy chain in Ipswich.
