= Electoral district of Ipswich =

State electoral district of Queensland, Australia

Ipswich Queensland—Legislative Assembly
- Ipswich electoral map 2017
- State: Queensland
- Dates current: 1860–1960, 1972–present
- MP: Jennifer Howard
- Party: Labor
- Namesake: Ipswich
- Electors: 33,668 (2020)
- Area: 86 km^{2} (33.2 sq mi)
- Demographic: Provincial
- Coordinates: 27°38′S 152°46′E
Electorates around Ipswich:
Ipswich West	Ipswich West	Bundamba
Scenic Rim	Ipswich	Bundamba
Scenic Rim	Jordan	Bundamba

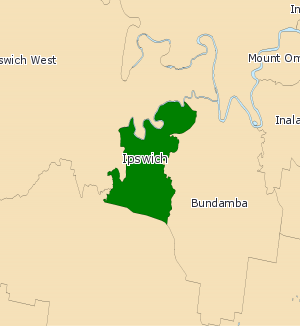
2008 Electoral Map

Ipswich is a Legislative Assembly of Queensland electoral district on the Brisbane River, west of Brisbane in the Australian state of Queensland. The electorate includes Ipswich and its suburbs, south and east of the Bremer River, west of Bundamba Creek and north of the Cunningham Highway.

== History ==
The electoral district of Town of Ipswich was one of the original 16 established in 1859, when Queensland became a separate colony. It returned 3 members.

In the redistribution of 1872, its name was shortened to just "Ipswich" and it became a single member constituency, due to the creation of the electoral district of Bundamba. In the redistribution of 1878, it absorbed the electoral district of Bremer and became a dual-member constituency.

In 1912, it again reverted to a single member constituency, due to the re-introduction of the single-member electoral district of Bremer.

== Members for Ipswich ==
Town of Ipswich: First incarnation (1860–1960), 3 members until 1873
Member 1	Party	Term	Member 2	Party	Term	Member 3	Party	Term
Frederick Forbes	Unaligned	1860–1863	Patrick O'Sullivan	Unaligned	1860–1863	Arthur Macalister	Unaligned	1860–1868
Ratcliffe Pring	Unaligned	1863–1866	Henry Challinor	Unaligned	1863–1868	Arthur Macalister	Unaligned	1860–1868
George Reed	Unaligned	1866–1867	John Thompson	Unaligned	1868–1873	Henry Williams	Unaligned	1868–1870
John Murphy	Unaligned	1867–1870	John Thompson	Unaligned	1868–1873	Henry Williams	Unaligned	1868–1870
Benjamin Cribb	Unaligned	1870–1873	John Thompson	Unaligned	1868–1873	John Johnston	Unaligned	1870–1872
Benjamin Cribb	Unaligned	1870–1873	John Thompson	Unaligned	1868–1873	Arthur Macalister	Unaligned	1872–1873
Ipswich: 1873–1878, 1 member
Member	Party	Term						
Arthur Macalister	Unaligned	1873–1876						
George Thorn, Jr.	Unaligned	1876–1878						
1878–1912, 2 members
Member 1	Party	Term	Member 2	Party	Term			
John Thompson	Unaligned	1878–1881	John MacFarlane	Ministerialist	1878–1894			
Josiah Francis	Unaligned	1881–1883	John MacFarlane	Ministerialist	1878–1894			
William Salkeld	Unaligned	1883–1888	John MacFarlane	Ministerialist	1878–1894			
Andrew Henry Barlow	Ministerialist	1888–1896	John MacFarlane	Ministerialist	1878–1894			
James Wilkinson	Labour	1894–1896	Alfred Stephenson	Ministerialist	1896–1902			
Thomas Bridson Cribb	Ministerialist	1896–1904	Sir James Blair	Independent/ Ministerialist/ Opposition	1902–1912			
William Maughan	Labour	1904–1912	Sir James Blair	Independent/ Ministerialist/ Opposition	1902–1912			
1912–1960, 1 member
Member	Party	Term						
Sir James Blair	Ministerialist/Independent	1912–1915						
David Gledson	Labor	1915–1929						
James Walker	Country and Progressive National	1929–1932						
David Gledson	Labor	1932–1949						
Ivor Marsden	Labor	1949–1960						

Second incarnation (1972–present), 1 member
Member	Party	Term
Llew Edwards	Liberal	1972–1983
David Hamill	Labor	1983–2001
Rachel Nolan	Labor	2001–2012
Ian Berry	Liberal National	2012–2015
Jennifer Howard	Labor	2015–present

== Election results ==
2024 Queensland state election: Ipswich
Party	Candidate	Votes	%	±%
Labor	Jennifer Howard	14,069	42.64	−9.16
Liberal National	Damian Culpeper	9,604	29.10	+8.77
Greens	Amanda Holly	3,527	10.69	+2.25
One Nation	Mathew Riesenweber	2,427	7.36	−6.55
Legalise Cannabis	Deborah Forrester	1,734	5.25	−0.27
Family First	Karen Fuller	1,637	4.96	+4.96
Total formal votes		32,998	95.56	−1.36
Informal votes		1,533	4.44	+1.36
Turnout		35,916	87.45	+0.49
Two-party-preferred result
Labor	Jennifer Howard	19,435	58.90	−7.62
Liberal National	Damian Culpeper	13,563	41.10	+7.62
Labor hold		Swing	−7.62	
