= Henry Williams (Queensland politician) =

Australian politician

Member of the Queensland Legislative Assembly for Ipswich
- In office 26 September 1868 – 12 August 1870 Serving with John Murphy, John Thompson
- Preceded by: Patrick O'Sullivan
- Succeeded by: John Thompson

Personal details
- Born: Henry Caleb Williams; 1832
- Died: 19 August 1871 (aged 38 or 39) Weston-super-Mare, Somerset, England
- Spouse: Emma Johnson
- Occupation: Ironmonger

Henry Caleb Williams (1832 – 19 August 1871) was a politician in Queensland, Australia. He was a Member of the Queensland Legislative Assembly.

== Early life ==
Henry Caleb Williams was born in 1832.

== Politics ==
Williams was the mayor of the then Town of Ipswich between 1868 and 1869.

He was one of three members of the Queensland Legislative Assembly for the Electoral district of Ipswich from 26 September 1868 to 12 August 1870.

== Later life ==
William died on 19 August 1871 in Weston-super-Mare, Somerset, United Kingdom.

Parliament of Queensland
Preceded by Patrick O'Sullivan	Member for Ipswich; 1868–1870; Served alongside: John Murphy, John Thompson	Succeeded by John Thompson
