= Members of the Queensland Legislative Assembly, 1893–1896 =

This is a list of members of the 11th Legislative Assembly of Queensland from 1893 to 1896, as elected at the 1893 colonial election held between 18 April 1893 and 25 May 1893 (due to problems of distance and communications, it was not possible to hold the elections on a single day).

| Name | Party | Electorate | Term in office |
|---|---|---|---|
| George Agnew | Ministerialist | Nundah | 1888–1896 |
| William Allan | Ministerialist | Cunningham | 1881–1883; 1887–1896 |
| John Annear | Ministerialist | Maryborough | 1884–1902 |
| Archibald Archer | Independent | Rockhampton | 1867–1869; 1878–1886; 1888–1896 |
| William Drayton Armstrong | Ministerialist | Lockyer | 1893–1904; 1907–1918 |
| Andrew Henry Barlow | Ministerialist | Ipswich | 1888–1896 |
| Matthew Battersby | Ministerialist | Moreton | 1888–1899 |
| Joshua Thomas Bell | Ministerialist | Dalby | 1893–1911 |
| Jason Boles | Opposition | Port Curtis | 1893–1904 |
| William Browne | Labour | Croydon | 1893–1904 |
| George Burns^{[1]} | Ministerialist | Townsville | 1893–1893 |
| Thomas Joseph Byrnes | Ministerialist | Cairns | 1893–1898 |
| James Cadell | Independent | Burnett | 1891–1896 |
| Albert Callan | Ind./Min. | Fitzroy | 1889–1902 |
| John Cameron | Opp./Min. | Mitchell | 1893–1896; 1901–1908 |
| James Chataway | Ministerialist | Mackay | 1893–1901 |
| William Henry Corfield | Ministerialist | Gregory | 1888–1899 |
| Alfred Cowley | Ministerialist | Herbert | 1888–1907 |
| James Cribb | Ministerialist | Rosewood | 1893–1896; 1899–1915 |
| James Crombie | Ministerialist | Warrego | 1888–1898 |
| John Cross | Labour | Clermont | 1893–1899 |
| George Curtis | Ind./Opp. | Rockhampton | 1893–1902 |
| David Dalrymple | Ministerialist | Mackay | 1888–1904 |
| Henry Daniels | Farmers/Labour | Cambooya | 1893–1899 |
| Anderson Dawson | Labour | Charters Towers | 1893–1901 |
| James Dickson | Min./Ind. | Bulimba | 1873–1888; 1892–1901 |
| James Drake | Opposition | Enoggera | 1888–1899 |
| Michael Duffy | Ministerialist | Bundaberg | 1893–1896 |
| John Dunsford | Labour | Charters Towers | 1893–1905 |
| Andrew Fisher | Labour | Gympie | 1893–1896; 1899–1901 |
| John Fogarty | Labour/Opp. | Drayton and Toowoomba | 1893–1904 |
| Justin Foxton | Ministerialist | Carnarvon | 1883–1904 |
| Thomas Glassey^{[3]} | Labour | Burke | 1888–1893; 1894–1901 |
| Samuel Grimes | Ministerialist | Oxley | 1878–1902 |
| William Henry Groom | Opposition | Drayton and Toowoomba | 1862–1901 |
| John Hamilton | Ministerialist | Cook | 1878–1904 |
| Herbert Hardacre | Labour | Leichhardt | 1893–1919 |
| William Harding | Ind./Opp. | North Rockhampton | 1893–1896 |
| John Hoolan^{[3]} | Labour | Burke | 1890–1894; 1896–1899 |
| George Jackson | Labour | Kennedy | 1893–1909 |
| George Kerr | Labour | Barcoo | 1893–1909 |
| Robert King | Labour | Maranoa | 1893–1899 |
| John James Kingsbury | Ministerialist | North Brisbane | 1893–1896 |
| John Leahy | Independent | Bulloo | 1893–1909 |
| Frederick Lord | Ministerialist | Stanley | 1893–1902 |
| William Lovejoy^{[4]} | Opposition | Aubigny | 1893–1894 |
| Charles McDonald | Labour | Flinders | 1893–1901 |
| John MacFarlane^{[2]} | Ministerialist | Ipswich | 1878–1894 |
| Thomas McIlwraith | Ministerialist | North Brisbane | 1870–1871; 1873–1886; 1888–1896 |
| John McMaster | Ministerialist | Fortitude Valley | 1885–1899; 1901–1904; 1907–1908 |
| Charles Midson | Ministerialist | South Brisbane | 1893–1896 |
| Boyd Dunlop Morehead | Ministerialist | Balonne | 1871–1880; 1883–1896 |
| Arthur Morgan | Opposition | Warwick | 1887–1896; 1898–1906 |
| John Murray | Ministerialist | Normanby | 1888–1901 |
| Hugh Nelson | Ministerialist | Murilla | 1883–1898 |
| William O'Connell | Ministerialist | Musgrave | 1888–1903 |
| Anthony Ogden^{[1]} | Labour | Townsville | 1894–1896 |
| Andrew Lang Petrie^{[5]} | Ministerialist | Toombul | 1893–1926 |
| George Phillips | Ministerialist | Carpentaria | 1893–1896 |
| Robert Philp | Ministerialist | Townsville | 1886–1915 |
| Thomas Plunkett | Ministerialist | Albert | 1888–1896; 1899–1908 |
| Charles Powers | Opposition | Maryborough | 1888–1896 |
| William Rawlings | Labour | Woothakata | 1893–1896 |
| Matthew Reid | Labour | Toowong | 1893–1896; 1899–1902 |
| Robert Harrison Smith | Ministerialist | Bowen | 1888–1902 |
| William Smyth | Ministerialist | Gympie | 1883–1899 |
| William Stephens | Ministerialist | Woolloongabba | 1888–1904; 1907–1908 |
| Ernest James Stevens | Independent | Logan | 1878–1896 |
| Lewis Thomas | Ministerialist | Bundamba | 1893–1899 |
| George Thorn | Ministerialist | Fassifern | 1867–1874; 1876–1878; 1879–1883; 1887–1888; 1893–1902 |
| William Thorn^{[4]} | Opposition | Aubigny | 1894–1904; 1908–1912 |
| Nicholas Tooth | Ministerialist | Burrum | 1893–1902 |
| Horace Tozer | Ministerialist | Wide Bay | 1871; 1888–1898 |
| Henry Turley | Labour | South Brisbane | 1893–1902 |
| John Watson | Ministerialist | Fortitude Valley | 1888–1896 |
| James Wilkinson^{[2]} | Labour | Ipswich | 1894–1896 |

== See also ==
- Premier:

Thomas McIlwraith (Ministerialist) (1893)
Hugh Nelson (Ministerialist) (1893–1898)

== Notes ==
^{1} On 5 November 1893, George Burns, one of the two Ministerialist members for Townsville, died. Labour candidate Anthony Ogden won the resulting by-election held on 20 January 1894.
^{2} On 7 March 1894, John MacFarlane, one of the two Ministerialist members for Ipswich, died. Labour candidate James Wilkinson won the resulting by-election on 31 March 1894.
^{3} On 12 March 1894, John Hoolan, the Labour member for Burke, resigned in order that party leader Thomas Glassey, who had lost his seat at the 1893 election, could re-enter Parliament. Glassey did so at the resulting by-election on 16 June 1894.
^{4} On 17 July 1894, the seat of Aubigny was declared vacant due to the insolvency of sitting Opposition member William Lovejoy. However, following an arrangement with his creditors, he was again eligible to be a member of parliament and stood for re-election at the resulting by-election on 4 August 1894. However, Opposition candidate William Thorn won the resulting by-election by a narrow margin of 8 votes.
^{5} On 17 July 1894, the seat of Toombul was declared vacant due to the insolvency of sitting Ministerialist member Andrew Lang Petrie. However, following an arrangement with his creditors, he was again eligible to be a member of parliament and was re-elected at the resulting by-election on 4 August 1894.
