= Charles Kilpatrick =

Charles Kilpatrick may refer to:

- Charles Kilpatrick (athlete) (1874–1921), American athlete
- Charles Kilpatrick (cyclist), American entertainer
- Charles Kilpatrick (politician), trade union president and member of the Queensland Legislative Council
