= James Wilkinson (Australian politician) =

Australian politician (1854–1915)

The Honourable James Wilkinson
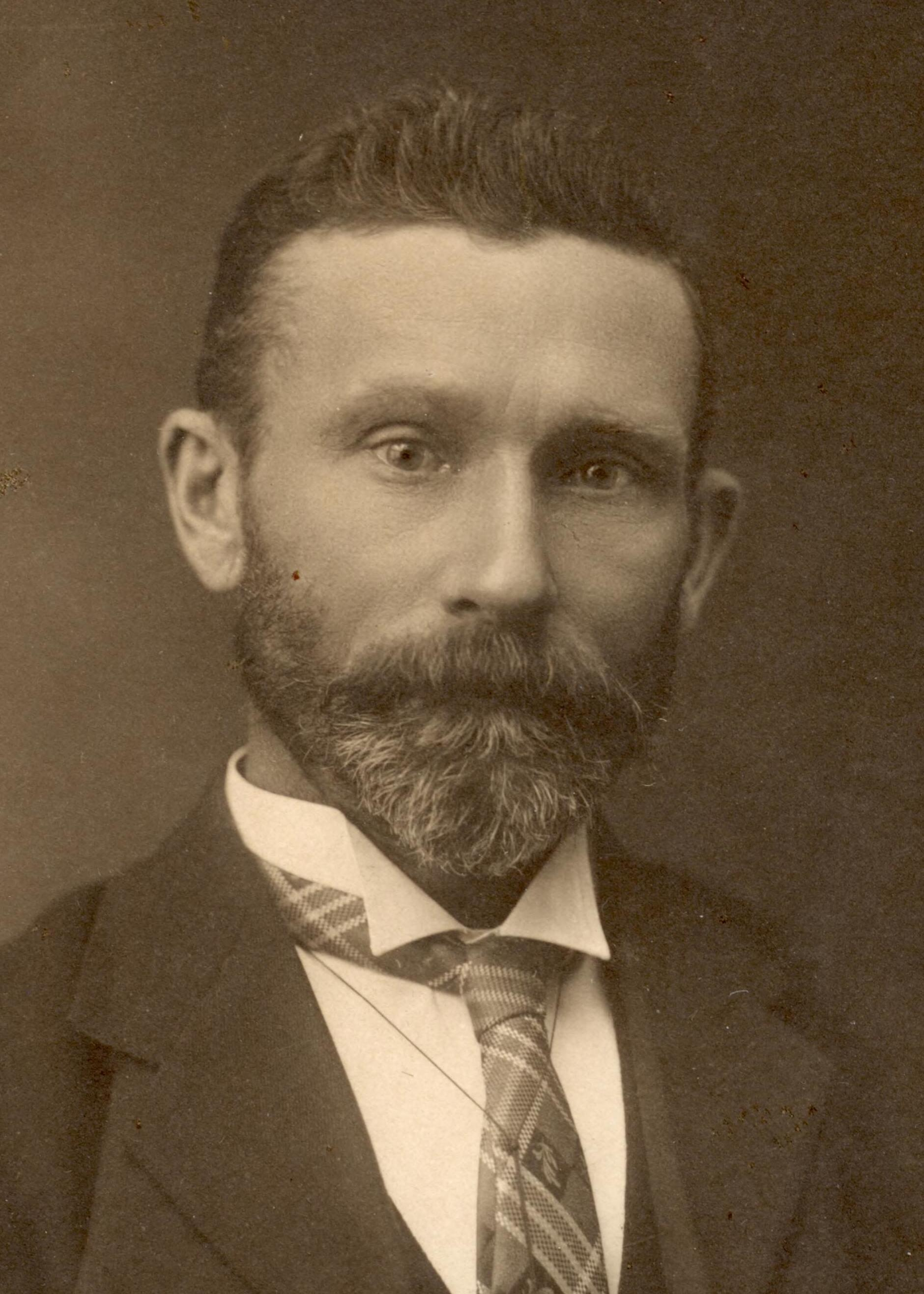

Member of the Australian Parliament for Moreton
- In office 30 March 1901 – 12 December 1906
- Preceded by: New seat
- Succeeded by: Hugh Sinclair

Member of the Queensland Legislative Assembly for Ipswich
- In office 31 March 1894 – 21 March 1896 Serving with Andrew Barlow
- Preceded by: John MacFarlane
- Succeeded by: Alfred Stephenson

Personal details
- Born: 30 November 1854 Ipswich, Colony of New South Wales
- Died: 11 January 1915 (aged 60) Ipswich, Queensland, Australia
- Resting place: Ipswich General Cemetery
- Party: Labour (1894–1896, after 1903)
- Other political affiliations: Independent (1901–1903)
- Spouse: Louisa Ann Smith (m.1874 d.1926)
- Occupation: Engine driver

James Wilkinson (30 November 1854 – 11 January 1915) was an Australian politician.

Wilkinson was born and raised in Ipswich, Colony of New South Wales. When he was about six the area became part of the new Colony of Queensland. He attended both state and grammar schools. During his early years he was an engine-driver and railways unionist before serving as an Alderman on Ipswich Council.

Wilkinson represented the Electoral district of Ipswich in the Legislative Assembly of Queensland from 1894 to 1896 for the Australian Labor Party. He was elected for the seat of Moreton in the Parliament of Australia in 1901, as an Independent Labour member, but rejoined the Labor Party in 1903.

Wilkinson died in 1915. His funeral took place from his Martin Street residence in Ipswich and he was buried in the Ipswich General Cemetery.

== Street name ==
A number of street names in the Brisbane suburb of Carina Heights are identical to the surnames of former Members of the Queensland Legislative Assembly. One of these is Wilkinson Street.

Parliament of Australia
New division	Member for Moreton; 1901–1906	Succeeded by Hugh Sinclair
Parliament of Queensland
Preceded by John MacFarlane	Member for Ipswich; 1894–1896; Served alongside: Andrew Barlow	Succeeded by Alfred Stephenson
