= Andrew Henry Barlow =

Australian politician

The Hon Andrew Barlow
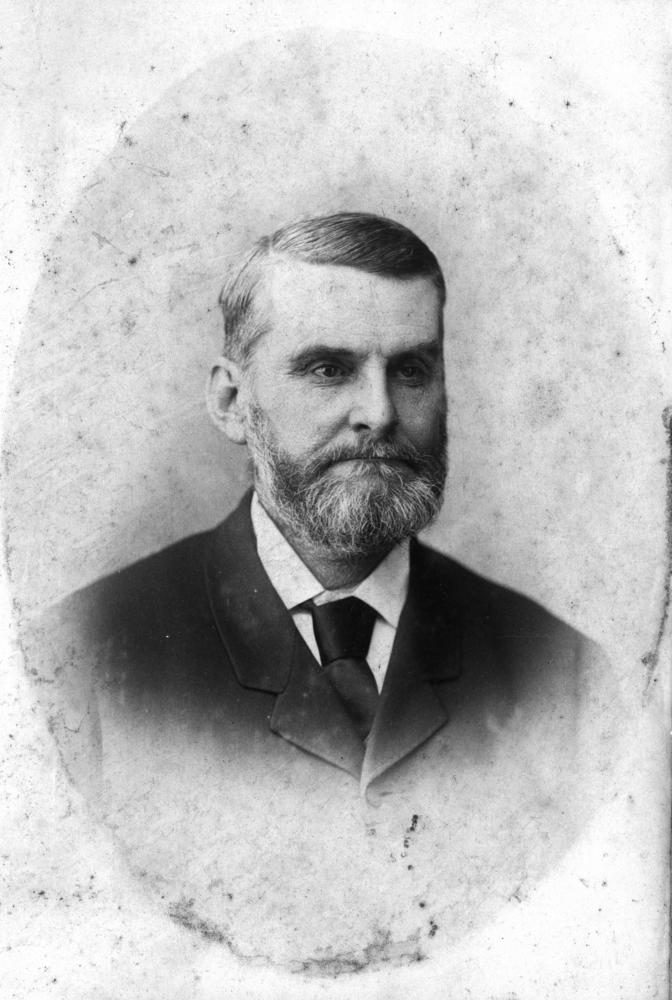
- Andrew Henry Barlow in 1889

Member of the Queensland Legislative Assembly for Ipswich
- In office 5 May 1888 – 21 March 1896 Serving with John MacFarlane, James Wilkinson
- Preceded by: William Salkeld
- Succeeded by: Alfred Stephenson

Member of the Queensland Legislative Council
- In office 10 June 1896 – 29 March 1915

Personal details
- Born: Andrew Henry Barlow; 8 September 1837 Wanstead, Essex, England
- Died: 29 March 1915 (aged 77) Brisbane, Queensland, Australia
- Resting place: Toowong Cemetery
- Party: Ministerial
- Spouse: Eleanor Marion Outridge (m.1873 d.1941)
- Occupation: Banker

Andrew Henry Barlow (8 September 1837 – 29 March 1915) was a politician in Queensland, Australia. He was a Member of the Queensland Legislative Assembly and a Member of the Queensland Legislative Council.

== Early life ==
Andrew Henry Barlow was born on 8 September 1837 in Wanstead, Essex, England, the son of John Henry Barlow and his wife Eliza Ann (née Burnstead).

Andrew Barlow immigrated with his father to Sydney in 1848, where after completing his education, Andrew Barlow commenced working on 11 July 1851 for the Bank of Australasia at various locations Australian and New Zealand.

On 23 September 1873, Barlow married New Zealand-born Eleanor Marion Outridge (1854–1941). The couple had one son, Henry Edward Barlow (1876–1957).

In 1878, he was appointed the manager in Ipswich, Queensland, from which he retired in January 1885 due to a chronic liver problem.

== Politics ==
Barlow was elected on the Queensland Legislative Assembly on 5 May 1888 (the 1888 colonial election) in the electoral district of Ipswich. He held the seat in the 1893 election and continued to represent Ipswich until 21 March 1896 (the 1896 election). During this period, he served as the Secretary for Public Lands and Agriculture from 27 March 1893 to 6 May 1896.

Barlow was appointed to the Queensland Legislative Council on 10 June 1896 and, being a lifetime appointment, his service ended with his death on 29 March 1915. During this time, he held many roles. He was the Government representative in the council from 6 May 1896 to 1 December 1899, the secretary for public instruction from 17 September 1903 to 19 November 1907 and then again from 18 February 1908 to 29 June 1909, after which he was minister without portfolio from 29 June 1909 until his death.

== Later life ==
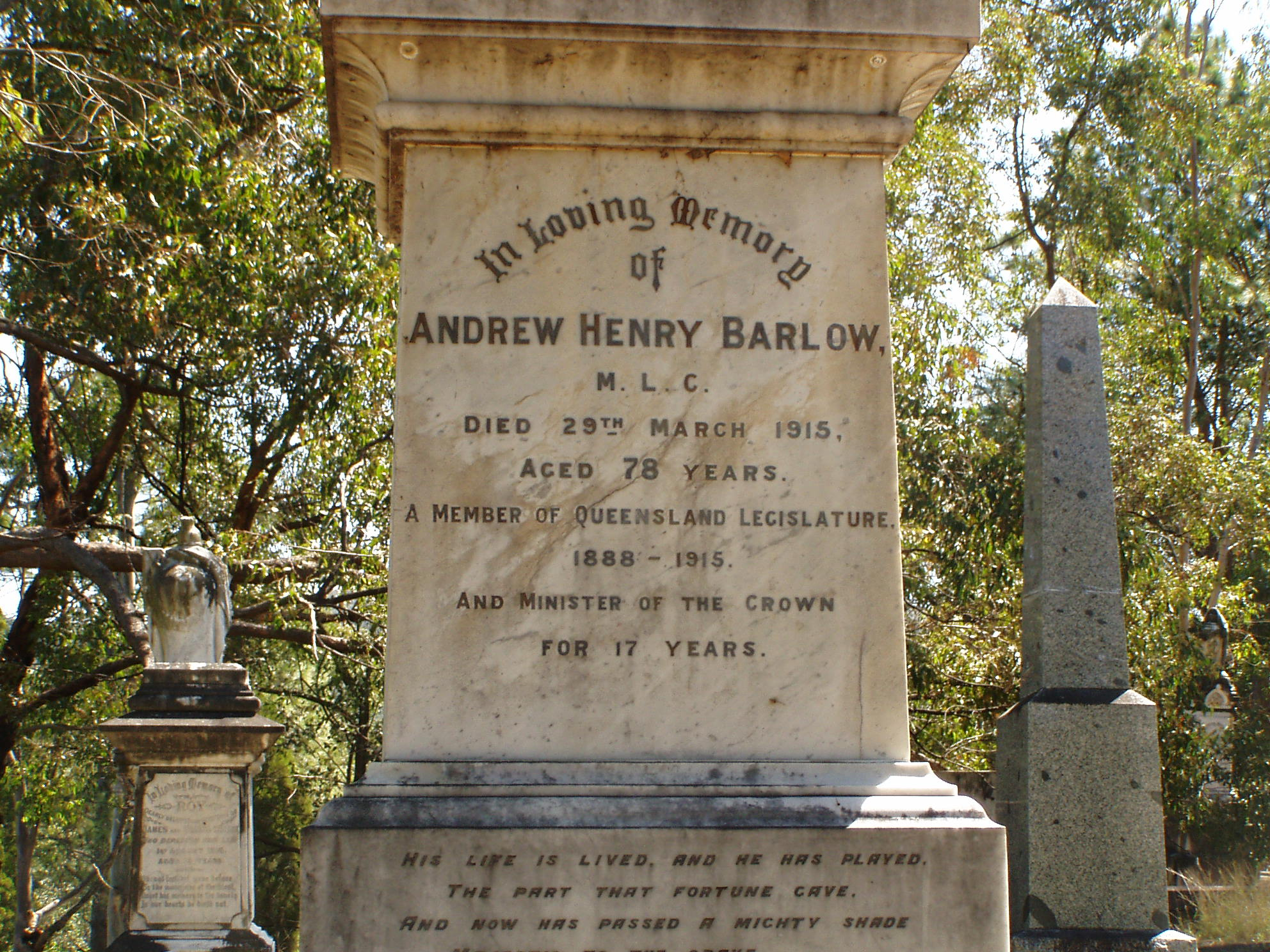
Andrew Barlow's Headstone at Toowong Cemetery

Barlow died on 29 March 1915 at Brisbane. A state funeral was held on 30 March 1915 at St John's Anglican Cathedral, followed by a funeral cortege to the Toowong Cemetery where he was buried.

== See also ==
- Members of the Queensland Legislative Assembly, 1888–1893; 1893–1896
- Members of the Queensland Legislative Council, 1890–1899; 1900–1909; 1910–1916

Parliament of Queensland
Preceded by William Salkeld	Member for Ipswich; 1888–1896; Served alongside: John MacFarlane, James Wilkinson	Succeeded by Alfred Stephenson
