= William Salkeld (politician) =

Australian politician

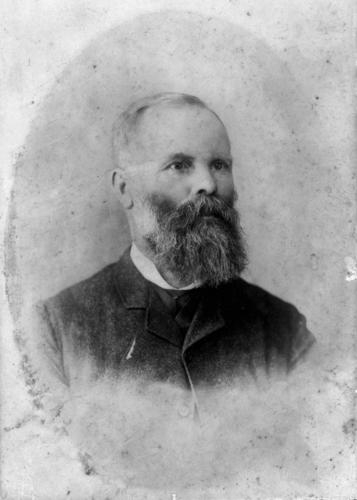

Member of the Queensland Legislative Assembly for Ipswich
- In office 21 August 1883 – 5 May 1888 Serving with John MacFarlane
- Preceded by: Josiah Francis
- Succeeded by: Andrew Barlow

Member of the Queensland Legislative Assembly for Fassifern
- In office 10 May 1888 – 6 May 1893
- Preceded by: George Thorn Jr.
- Succeeded by: George Thorn Jr.

Personal details
- Born: William Salkeld; January 1842 Melmerby, Cumberland, England
- Died: 28 June 1901 (aged 59) Ipswich, Queensland, Australia
- Spouse: Margaret Davies (m.1875 d.1932)
- Occupation: Sawmiller

William Salkeld was a politician in Queensland, Australia. He was a Member of the Queensland Legislative Assembly. He represented the electorate of Ipswich from 21 August 1883 to 5 May 1888 and the electorate of Fassifern from 10 May 1888 to 6 May 1893.

== Early life ==
William Salkeld was born in January 1842 at Melmerby, Cumberland, England, being the son of John Salkeld and Annie (née Nicholson). He was educated at Richmond's Private School, Gamblesby, England. Salkeld arrived in Queensland in 1886 and was a storekeeper in Ipswich. He was a partner in Hughes and Cameron, auctioneers, and in 1900 owned the Mount Brisbane Sawmill. He married Margaret Davis in Ipswich in Ipswich on 29 November 1875 and had one son.

== Later life ==
William Salkeld died on the 28 June 1901 in Ipswich, Queensland, from heart failure.

Parliament of Queensland
| Preceded by Josiah Francis | Member for Ipswich; 1883–1888; Served alongside: John MacFarlane | Succeeded by Andrew Barlow |
| Preceded by George Thorn Jr. | Member for Fassifern; 1888–1893 | Succeeded by George Thorn Jr. |
