= Francis North (Australian politician) =

Australian politician

Member of the Queensland Legislative Council
- In office 3 July 1863 – 9 December 1864

Personal details
- Born: Francis North; 1811 County Westmeath, Ireland
- Died: 1864 (aged 52–53) Ipswich Queensland, Australia
- Resting place: Ipswich General Cemetery
- Spouse(s): Margaret Elizabeth Glissan (m.1859 d.1861), Ellen Washbourne (m.1863 d.1864)
- Occupation: Station owner

Francis North (1811 – 9 December 1864) was a member of the Queensland Legislative Council.

North was appointed to the Queensland Legislative Council on 3 July 1863 and served until his death on 9 December 1864. He was buried in Ipswich General Cemetery.
