= Josiah Francis (Queensland politician) =

Australian politician

Member of the Queensland Legislative Assembly for Ipswich
- In office 8 August 1881 – 21 August 1883 Serving with John MacFarlane
- Preceded by: John Thompson
- Succeeded by: William Salkeld

Personal details
- Born: Josiah Youlten; 7 March 1825 St Ann's Chapel, Cornwall, England
- Died: 11 May 1891 (aged 66) Ipswich, Queensland, Australia
- Resting place: Ipswich General Cemetery
- Spouse: Elizabeth Dunstan (m.1849 d.1910)
- Relations: Josiah Francis (grandson)
- Occupation: Miner

Josiah Francis (7 March 1825 – 11 May 1891) was a miner and member of the Queensland Legislative Assembly.

== Biography ==
Francis was born at St Ann's Chapel, Cornwall, England, to father Joseph Youlten (1783–1832) and mother, Grace Nichols (1786–1852) was educated in St Ann's Chapel. After arriving in Australia he took up mining, working at Burra Burra in South Australia and in Ballarat and Bendigo in Victoria.

At Burra Burra in 1849 he married Elizabeth Dunstan (died 1910) and together had eight sons and six daughters. Some time after 10 August 1861 (the birth of Henry Alfred Youlten in South Australia) and before the birth of James Dunstone Francis in Queensland on 30 September 1863, the Youlten family migrated from South Australia to Queensland. On 10 April 1861, an auction was conducted at Norwood, South Australia, for the sale of all goods, livestock, etc. The dwelling was advertised within the same auction notice "to let". As well, all outstanding accounts were called for to enable settlement, as the family was "relocating to Yorke's Peninsula".

The first seven children of Josiah and Elizabeth were registered under the name of Youlten in South Australia between 1850 and 1861 and it would appear the Youlten children who survived and subsequently moved to Queensland with their parents were raised under the surname Francis so the family's name change probably coincided with their residency in Queensland.

The reasons for the name change are not known. He died in Ipswich, Queensland and was buried in the Ipswich General Cemetery.

== Public career ==
Francis was an alderman in Ipswich from 1876 until 1887. During that time he was twice Mayor, in 1878–1879 and 1884–1886.

He was the member for Ipswich in the Queensland Legislative Assembly from 1881 to 1883.

== Personal life ==
Francis' grandson, also named Josiah Francis, represented Ipswich in federal parliament and became a federal government minister.

Parliament of Queensland
| Preceded by John Thompson | Member for Ipswich; 1881–1883; Served alongside: John MacFarlane | Succeeded by William Salkeld |
