= Josiah Francis =

Australian politician (1890–1964)

The Honourable Sir Josiah Francis
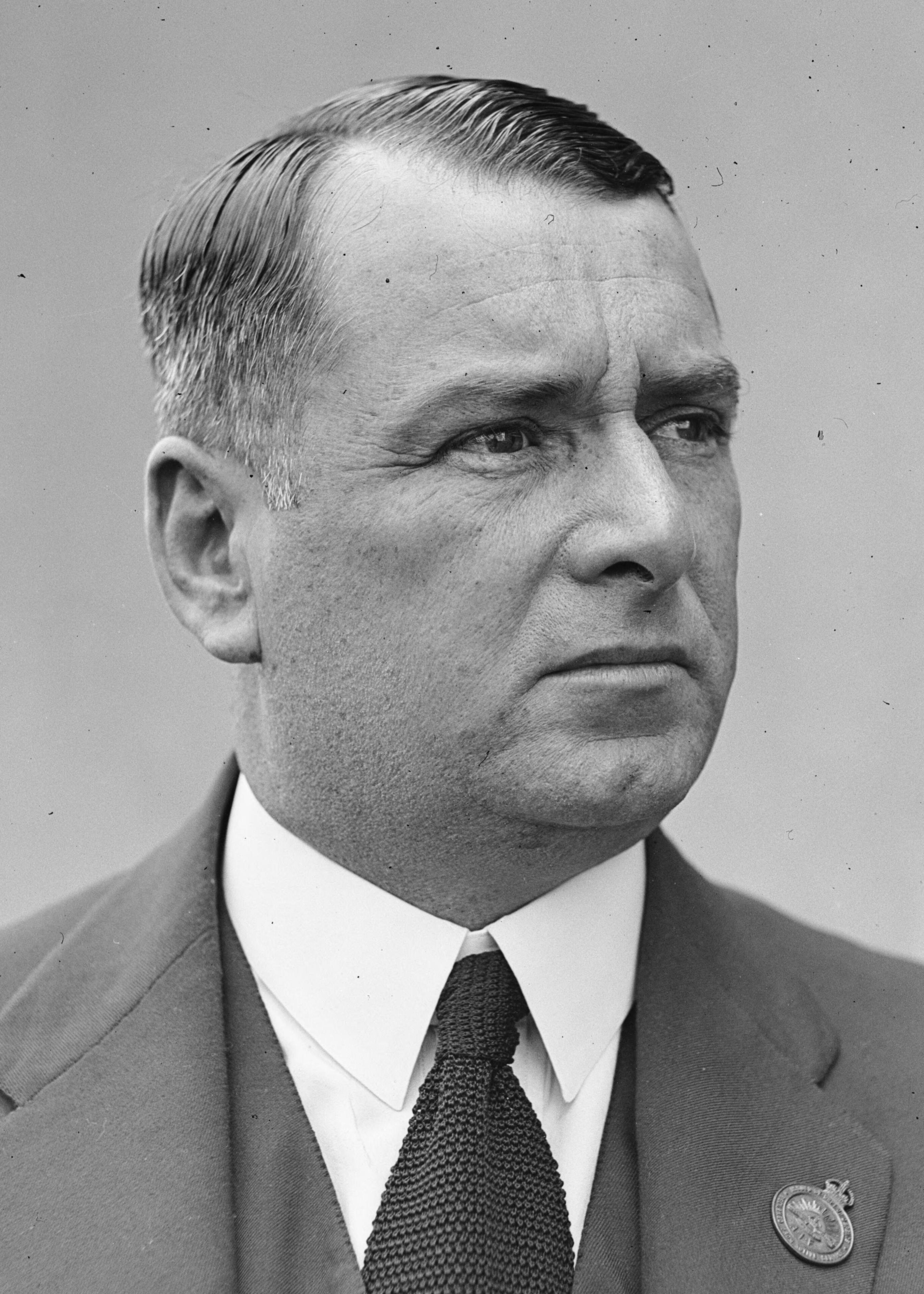
- Francis in 1932.

Minister for the Navy
- In office 9 July 1954 – 11 July 1955
- Prime Minister: Robert Menzies
- Preceded by: William McMahon
- Succeeded by: Eric Harrison
- In office 19 December 1949 – 11 May 1951
- Prime Minister: Robert Menzies
- Preceded by: Bill Riordan
- Succeeded by: Philip McBride

Minister for the Army
- In office 19 December 1949 – 7 November 1955
- Prime Minister: Robert Menzies
- Preceded by: Cyril Chambers
- Succeeded by: Eric Harrison

Minister in charge of War Service Homes
- In office 6 January 1932 – 9 November 1934
- Prime Minister: Joseph Lyons
- Preceded by: (new office)
- Succeeded by: Harold Thorby

Member of the Australian Parliament for Moreton
- In office 16 December 1922 – 4 November 1955
- Preceded by: Arnold Wienholt
- Succeeded by: James Killen

Personal details
- Born: 28 March 1890 Ipswich, Colony of Queensland
- Died: 22 February 1964 (aged 73) Toowong, Queensland, Australia
- Party: Liberal (1945–1955); United Australia (1931–1945); Nationalist (1922–1931)
- Spouse: Edna Cribb (m. 1927)
- Relations: Josiah (grandfather); James Clarke Cribb (father-in-law)
- Education: Christian Brothers' College, Ipswich

Military service
- Allegiance: Australia
- Branch/service: Australian Army
- Years of service: 1916–1919
- Rank: Captain
- Unit: First Australian Imperial Force
- Commands: 15th Battalion
- Battles/wars: World War I

Sir Josiah Francis (28 March 1890 – 22 February 1964) was an Australian politician who served in the House of Representatives from 1922 to 1955. He was a minister in the Lyons and Menzies governments, serving as Minister in charge of War Service Homes (1932–1934), Minister for the Army (1949–1955), and Minister for the Navy (1949–1951; 1954–1955). He held his defence portfolios during Australia's involvement in the Korean War.

== Early life ==
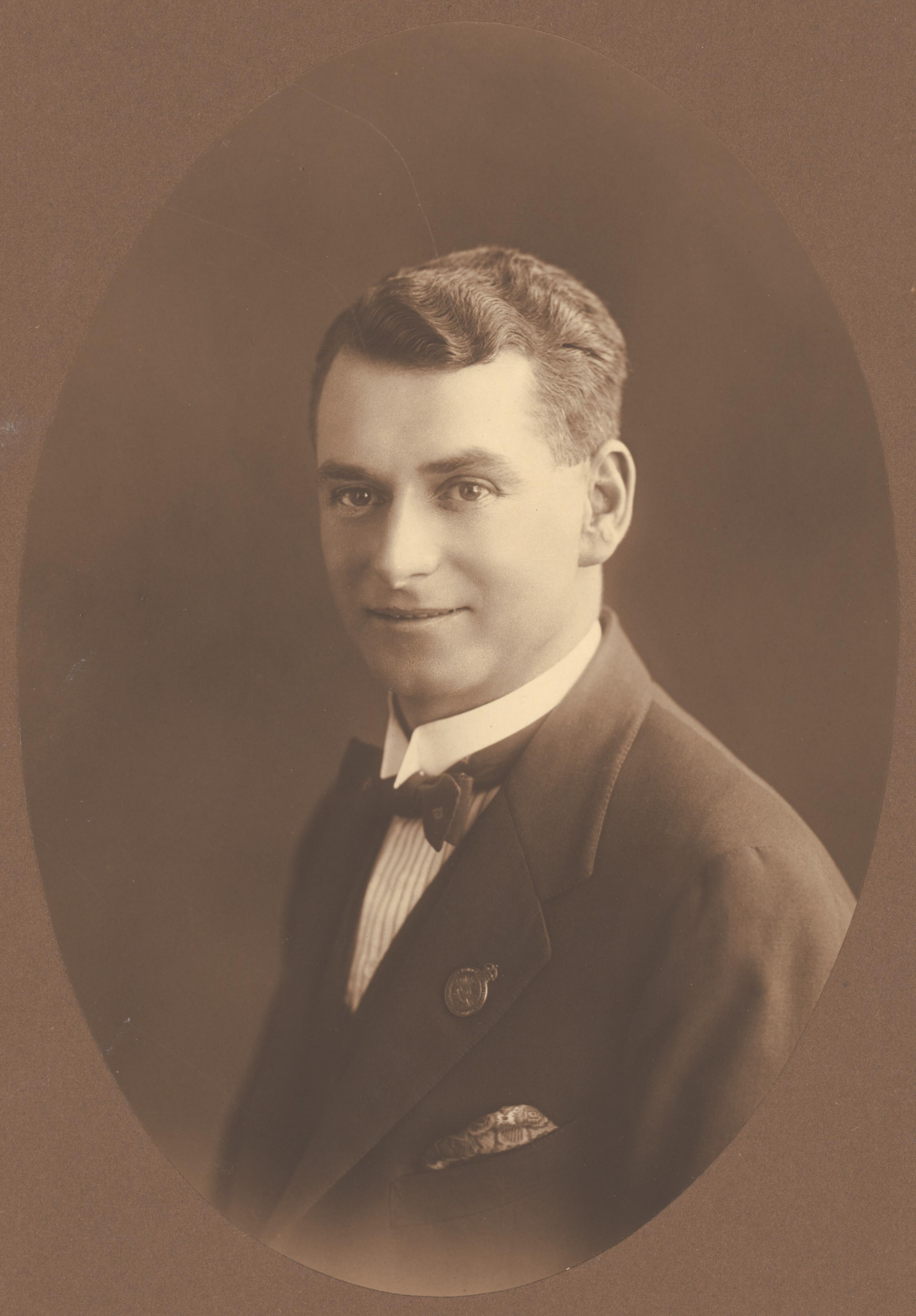
Francis as a young man

Francis was born on 28 March 1890 in Ipswich, Queensland. He was the son of Ada Florence (née Hooper) and Henry Alfred Francis. His grandfather Josiah Francis was a prominent businessman in Ipswich, serving as the town's mayor and representing the seat of Ipswich in the Queensland Legislative Assembly.

Francis was educated at Christian Brothers' College, Ipswich, before joining the Queensland Department of Justice as a clerk in 1908. He was commissioned as a second lieutenant in the Australian Imperial Force (AIF) in 1916. He served with the 15th Battalion in France from April 1917 and was wounded in the shoulder in March 1918, rejoining his unit in September after several months in hospital. He was promoted captain in November before being discharged in Australia in September 1919. Francis became prominent in the Returned Sailors' and Soldiers' Imperial League of Australia, serving as president of the Ipswich sub-branch and Moreton district division.

== Political career ==
Francis was elected to the Australian House of Representatives from the Brisbane-area seat of Moreton at the 1922 election as a member of the Nationalist Party of Australia. He continued to hold the seat until his retirement in November 1955 as a member of the main centre-right party—Nationalist (1922–1931), UAP (1931–1945) and Liberal (1945–1955). In April 1927, he married Edna Clarke Cribb—they had no children.

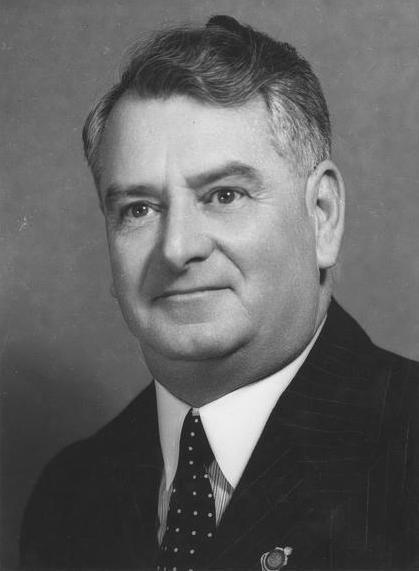
Francis in 1950.

He was Minister in charge of War Service Homes from 1932 to 1934. He had been a member of the Returned Sailors' and Soldiers' Imperial League of Australia since 1920 and supported returned servicemen's issues. In 1943, while in opposition, he moved an amendment to allow the payment of full pensions to returned servicemen who were suffering from tuberculosis regardless of whether or not it could be shown to be caused by war service. Unusually in Australia, his amendment was passed without dissent. With the election of the Menzies government at the December 1949 election, he was appointed Minister for the Army and Minister for the Navy. He held the army portfolio until his retirement and the navy portfolio until May 1951; he was also Minister for the Navy from July 1954 until his retirement.

== Later life ==
In 1956, Francis was appointed Australian consul general to New York. He was knighted in 1957 and retired to Brisbane in 1961. In 1962 he represented Australia at Uganda's independence celebrations. He also chaired the fundraising appeal for the Anzac Memorial Chapel at the Royal Military College, Duntroon.

== Personal life ==
In 1927, Francis married Edna Clarke Cribb, the daughter of state MP James Clarke Cribb. The couple had no children. He collapsed and died on 22 February 1964 while watching a regatta on the Brisbane River at Toowong. He was granted a state funeral which was held at the Albert Street Methodist Church and attended by former prime ministers Arthur Fadden and Frank Forde.

== Notes ==
Political offices
New title	Minister in charge of War Service Homes; 1932–1934	Succeeded by Harold Thorby
Preceded by Cyril Chambers	Minister for the Army; 1949–1955	Succeeded by Eric Harrison
Preceded by Bill Riordan	Minister for the Navy; 1949–1951	Succeeded by Philip McBride
Preceded by William McMahon	Minister for the Navy; 1954–1955	Succeeded by Eric Harrison
Parliament of Australia
Preceded by Arnold Wienholt	Member for Moreton; 1922–1955	Succeeded by James Killen
Diplomatic posts
Preceded by Edward Smart	Australian Consul General in New York; 1956–1961	Succeeded by Roden Cutler
