= Alfred John Stephenson =

Australian politician

The Honourable Alfred Stephenson
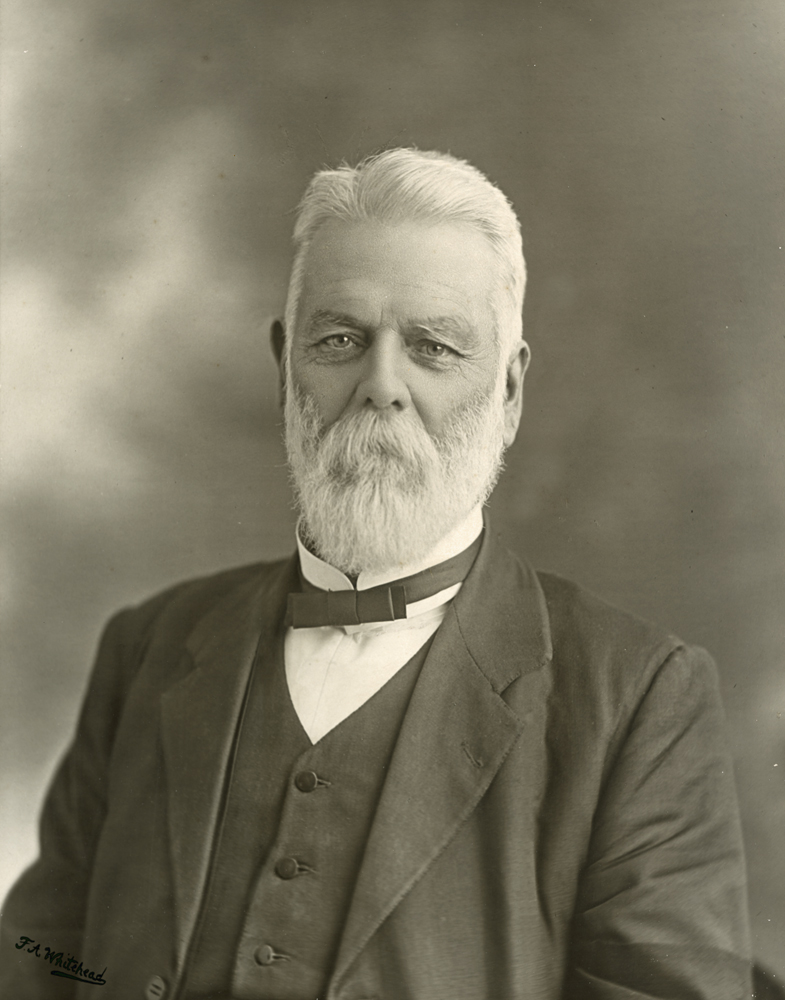
- Alfred John Stevenson, 1903

Member of the Queensland Legislative Assembly for Ipswich
- In office 21 March 1896 – 11 March 1902 Serving with Thomas Cribb
- Preceded by: James Wilkinson
- Succeeded by: James Blair

Member of the Queensland Legislative Council
- In office 3 July 1914 – 4 December 1914

Personal details
- Born: Alfred John Stevenson; 15 November 1845 Pimlico, London, England
- Died: 4 December 1914 (aged 69) Ipswich, Queensland, Australia
- Resting place: Ipswich General Cemetery
- Party: Ministerialist
- Spouse(s): Jane Graham Tully (m.1867 d.1909), Charlotte Lee Smith, (née Haffner) (m.1914 d.1943)
- Occupation: Printer, Newspaper proprietor

Alfred John Stephenson (1845–1914) was a politician in Queensland, Australia. He was a Member of the Queensland Legislative Assembly and a Member of the Queensland Legislative Council.

== Early life ==
Alfred John Stephenson was born on 15 November 1845 at Pimlico, London, England, the son of John Stephenson and his wife Martha. He attended a Birkbeck school and then a private academy.

At age 15, he left England and came to Ipswich, Queensland.

== Career ==
Stephenson was apprenticed as printer on the North Australian newspaper published in Ipswich. In 1877 he became one of the proprietors of the Queensland Times.

He served on various boards, trusts and committees including:

- Queensland Woollen Manufacturing Company
- Ipswich and West Moreton Building Society
- Ipswich General Hospital
- Ipswich Girls Grammar School
- Ipswich Technical College

== Politics ==
On 7 March 1894, John MacFarlane, one of the two Ministerialist members for Ipswich, died. Alfred Stephenson contested the resulting by-election on 31 March 1894 as a Ministerialist, but Australian Labour Party candidate James Wilkinson won.

Alfred John Stephenson was elected in the electoral district of Ipswich on 21 March 1896 (the 1896 election) and served until 11 March 1902 when he was defeated in the 1902 election by lawyer James Blair.

In June 1902, he was elected an alderman of the Ipswich City Council and served as mayor in 1907.

On 3 July 1914 he was appointed to the Queensland Legislative Council. He served on the council for only a few months until his death.

== Later life ==
His wife Jane died at their home Chermside, Roderick Street, Ipswich on 29 March 1909.

In May 1914, as District Grand Master of the English Freemasons, he travelled extensively through the northern parts of Queensland. While there, he contracted malaria after which his health progressively deteriorated.

Despite his failing health, on 24 November 1914, he married Charlotte Lee Smith (née Haffner), the widow of George William Smith, of Sans Souci, Sydney.

Alfred John Stephenson died on Friday 4 December 1914 at his home Chermside, Roderick Street, Ipswich. His funeral service was held on Sunday 6 December 1915 at the Old Ipswich Town Hall followed by a large funeral procession to the Ipswich General Cemetery where he was buried with masonic rites. As a mark of respect, the Queensland Legislative Council adjourned their sitting on that day.

His second wife Charlotte died on 19 February 1943 at the home of her daughter in Homebush in Sydney. She was buried on 20 February 1943 in the Woronora Cemetery.

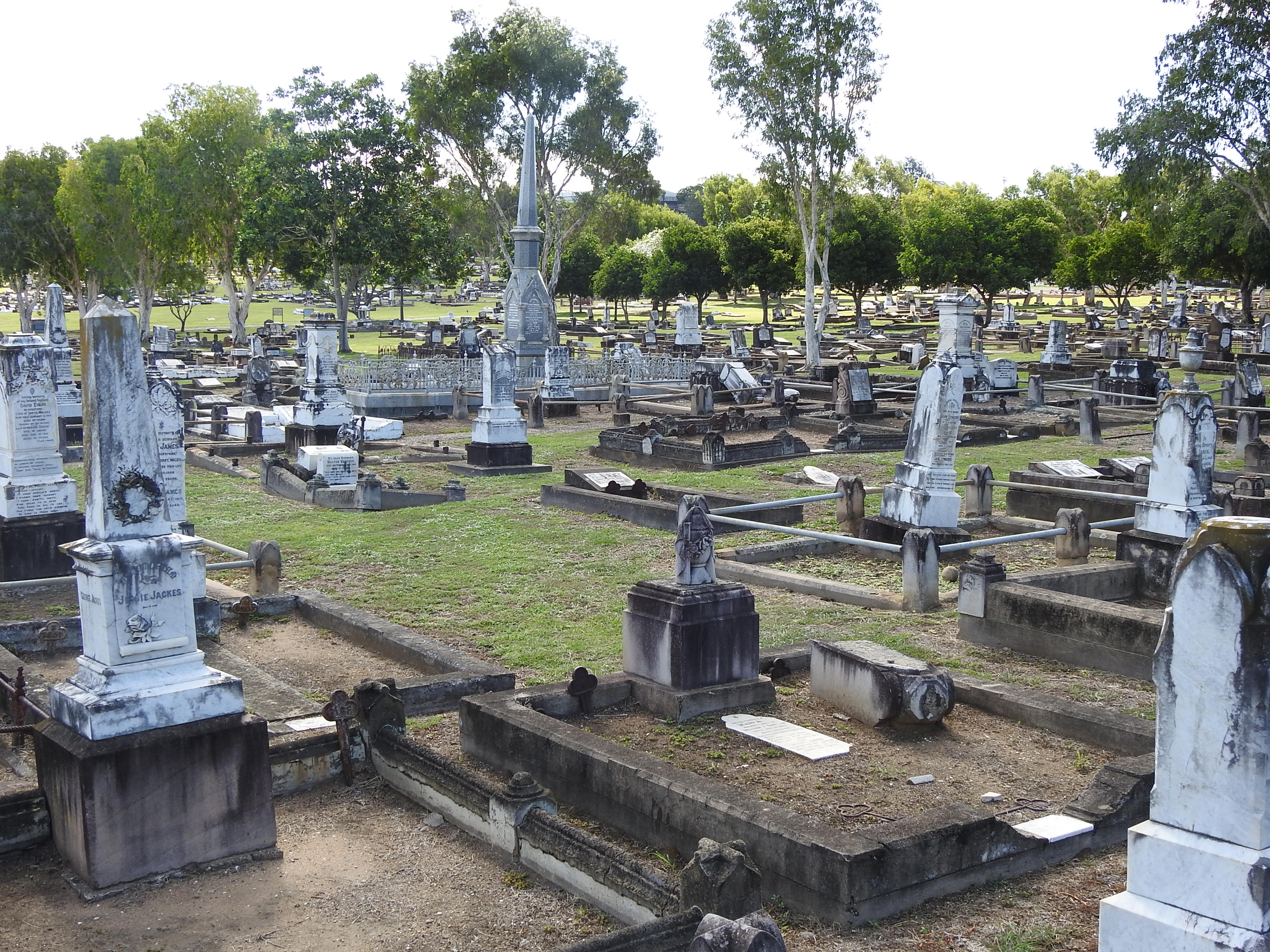
Congregational graves section, where Stephenson is buried, to the right of the monument of politician Lewis Thomas

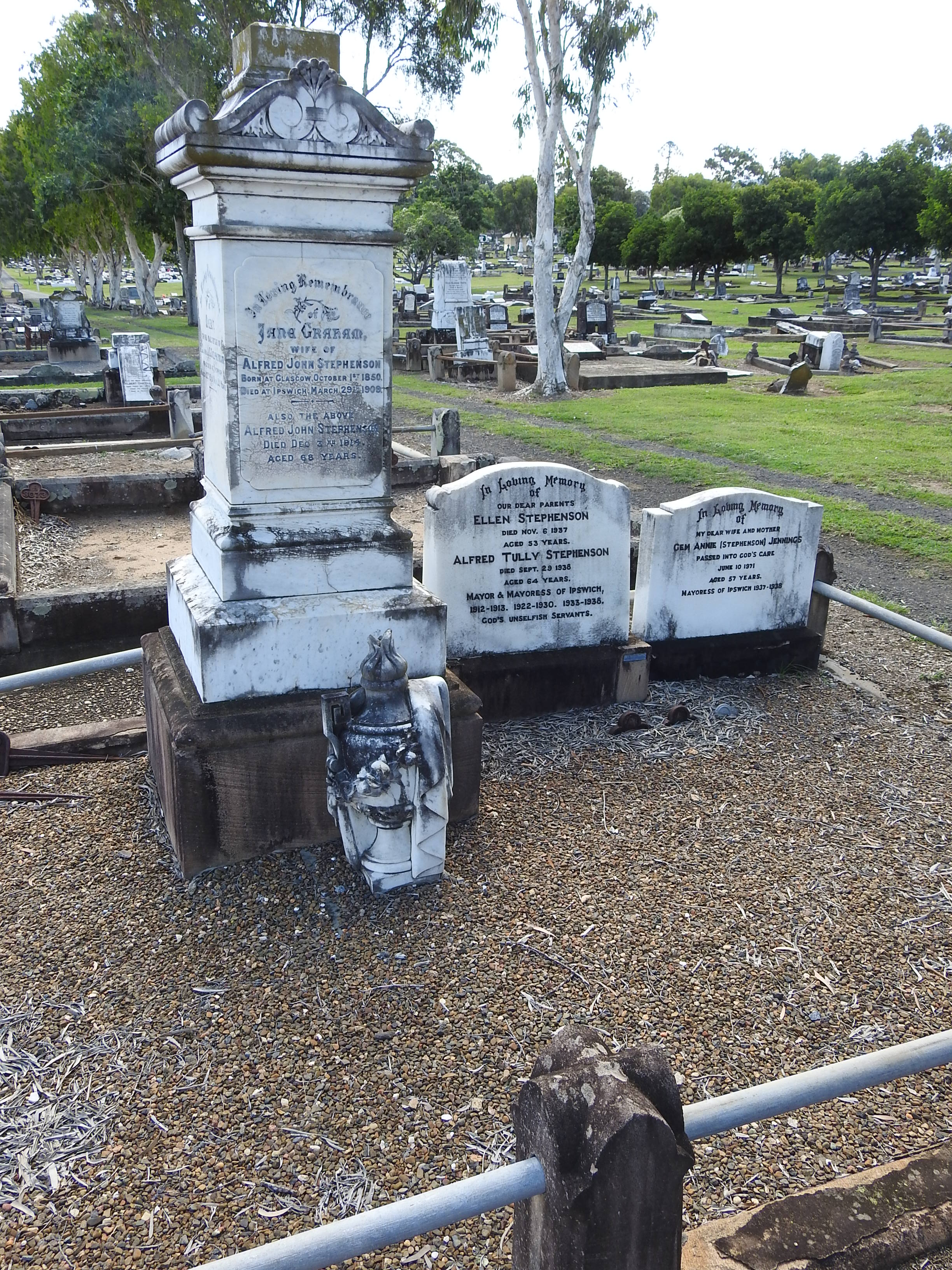
Family grave plot

== See also ==
- Members of the Queensland Legislative Assembly, 1896–1899; 1899–1902
- Members of the Queensland Legislative Council, 1910–1916

Parliament of Queensland
Preceded by James Wilkinson	Member for Ipswich; 1896–1902; Served alongside: Thomas Cribb	Succeeded by James Blair
