= Charles Kilpatrick (cyclist) =

American stunt performer and baseball umpire

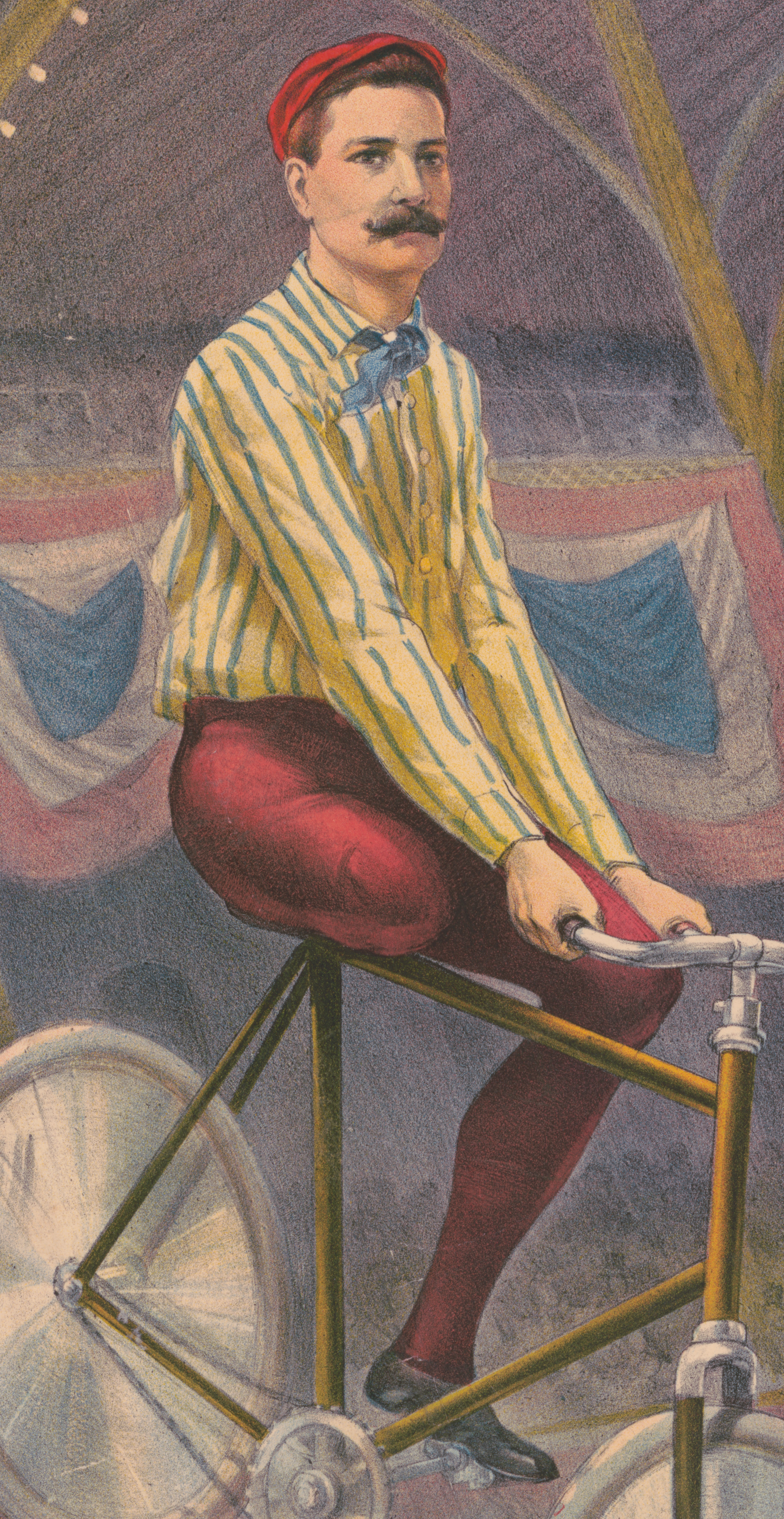
- A lithograph of Kilpatrick riding his bicycle, circa 1900

Personal information
- Full name: Charles G. Kilpatrick
- Born: September 11, 1869; Danville, Illinois, US
- Died: September 30, 1927 (aged 58); Danville, Illinois, US
- Occupation(s): miner, printing press operator, accident insurance agent
- Years active: 1893–1927
- Spouse: Madeline Kilpatrick

Sport
- Sport: baseball, stunt cycling
- Position: umpire
- Disability: amputee (right leg)
- Leagues: Illinois–Indiana League; Indiana State League; Wisconsin State League; Montana State League; Pacific Northwest League; Major League Baseball

Charles G. Kilpatrick (September 11, 1869 – September 30, 1927) was an American stunt performer and professional baseball umpire.

Kilpatrick lost his right leg in a rail accident while employed as a miner. He then began working as a printer and a baseball umpire in several professional leagues including the Wisconsin State League (which he also co-founded), the Montana State League and the Pacific Northwest League. Kilpatrick gained national and international attention for performing dangerous stunts for amusement. He performed a feat in which he would ride a bicycle down a specially constructed flight of stairs that would often reach heights of over 100 feet. In one performance in particular, Kilpatrick rode down a platform of stairs from the roof of Madison Square Garden to the arena floor. He later developed a similar stunt in which he would drive up a ramp in a steam-powered automobile and descend at a high speed.

== Biography ==
Born in Danville, Illinois, to James D. Kilpatrick, the former editor of the Vermilion County Press and Civil War veteran and Mary E. (née Cole), Kilpatrick left school to work as a miner where he lost his right leg in an accident with a rail car. Following his accident, he worked as a printing press operator.

Kilpatrick also worked as a baseball umpire in one Major League Baseball game and several minor league games, including Montana State League, where he became a close friend of future Hall of Famer Clark Griffith. Nicknamed the "Kangaroo Umpire" because he hopped on his left leg, Kilpatrick later stated that only having one leg was advantageous as he avoided much of the abuse other umpires received. Kilpatrick began umpiring in 1889 in the Illinois–Indiana League and later worked games in the Indiana State League, Illinois–Iowa League and the Pacific Northwest League. In 1890, along with Harry T. Smith, Kilpatrick founded the Wisconsin State League. He also served as the league's umpire.

=== Cycling and stunt career ===
Kilpatrick also took up cycling, found he was a natural and was soon experimenting with trick riding, giving exhibitions prior to baseball games he then umpired. He first came to widespread public attention on 18 April 1893 when he rode down the west steps of the Capitol building in Washington, D.C., followed by riding down the west steps of the White House. Kilpatrick then toured the country, duplicating the feat with a custom made flight of steps sixty feet high and four feet wide.

Kilpatrick began touring internationally in 1895 and continued to perform stunts that gained him notoriety, including standing with his wheel on top of the one hundred foot high Laxey Wheel in the Isle of Man. His act was considered so amazing in Britain that he unintentionally caused large traffic jams in cities as large groups of people followed him around the streets.

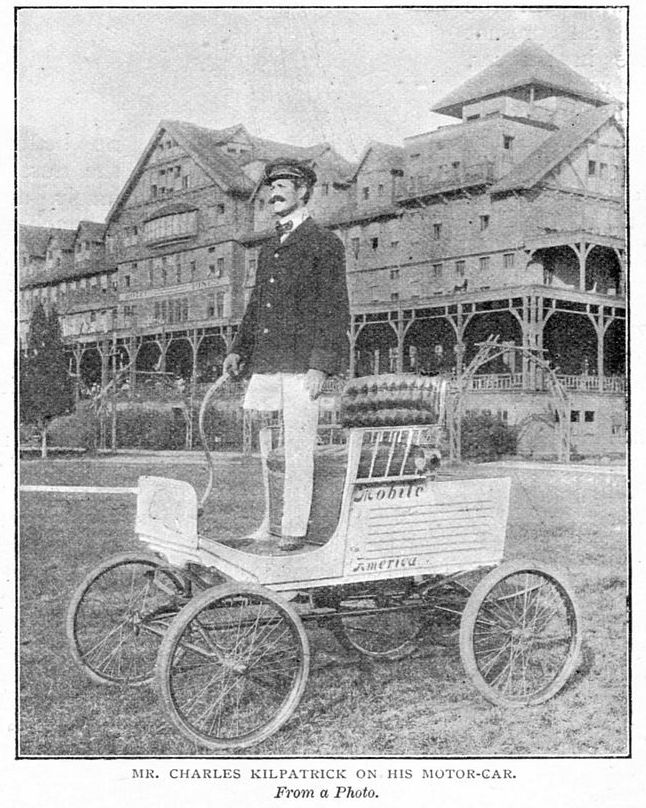
Kilpatrick standing in a steam-powered automobile manufactured by the Mobile Company of America, circa 1901.

Kilpatrick toured South Africa where he drew the attention of South African Republic President Paul Kruger who invited him to the Presidential mansion for tea, accompanied by a local newspaper editor who acted as a translator. Kruger presented him with a gold medal, leading to headlines in Johannesburg papers of "Kilpatrick, the luckiest man that over lived. He got a medal from Kruger, the first and only thing the President ever gave away."

Kilpatrick also visited Cuba following the Spanish–American War. He noted that when he was giving a pigeon shooting exhibition in Havana an elderly Spanish man turned to his neighbors and said, "No wonder these Yanks beat us when even their cripples are such wonderful shots." As a homage to the American victory in the Spanish–American War, Kilpatrick always wore a Rough Rider's uniform during his performances. While in Cuba he befriended boxer Kid McCoy and the two organised a bout between the two of them, which they advertised as genuine but was rehearsed. The fight was a sell out with hundreds turned away at the doors and saw Kilpatrick "knock out" McCoy.

Such was the public interest in Kilpatrick that he became the subject of an 1898 film, entitled Kilpatrick's Ride. Kilpatrick wore a cork prosthetic limb when not performing stunts.

Kilpatrick also diversified his act, including shooting clay pigeons while riding a unicycle and incorporating trick roller skating into his act.

By 1900, The New York Herald was declaring that Kilpatrick was "the most sensational act ever presented to a N.Y. public" and the press was reporting breathlessly on shows where Kilpatrick was causing spectators' faces to turn white and ladies to avert their gaze from what they believe will be certain death.

Although Kilpatrick took great safety precautions, even he could not avoid accidents, such as in Spokane, Washington in 1903 when an errant stone in his path led to a crash resulting in injuries. During the 1905 Lewis and Clark Centennial Exposition in Portland, Oregon, Kilpatrick performed several stunts throughout the month of July starting on Independence Day (July 4). The stunts included multiple performances of his signature bicycle ride down a flight of stairs and an automobile "dash" down a 140-foot ramp. Kilpatrick built a human roulette wheel, which was featured as an amusement exhibit at the 1909 Alaska–Yukon–Pacific Exposition in Seattle, Washington.

Kilpatrick continued to tour internationally, performing "in every large city on the face of the globe", including to Australia in 1912, where it was reported that he was "creating an absolute furore at every performance", and the press continued to report on his achievements, including his swim across the Mississippi River at Alton, Illinois on a dare, dealing with driftwood and a swift current. Such was his fame, Kilpatrick gained an endorsement from the Duncan yo-yo company and was later employed by the North American Accident Insurance Company to cover the entertainment industry. His move into insurance was met with "considerable success" as Kilpatrick regaled prospective customers with anecdotes of the old vaudeville days.

In 1926 Kilpatrick announced that, starting 1 January 1927, he would travel around the world "for the purpose of securing data for a special story." However, this did not occur as Kilpatrick died in Danville, Illinois on 30 September 1927, aged 58.

Bircus Brewery in Ludlow, Kentucky created a stout called "Kilpatrick's One Legged" in honor of the cyclist.

== Family ==
Kilpatrick's wife Madeline Kilpatrick was also a skilled trick cyclist. Taught by Charles, she claimed to increase the popularity of cycling among women and to be the first woman to wear "rational dress" while cycling in the south of the United States, which consisted of Turkish trousers, saying that at first she astonished crowds but her clothing was soon copied by other female cyclists. Madeline was called "one of the most daring women trick riders in the world." with one of her best tricks described as "riding on the back wheel of her machine, holding the front one up in the air on a level with her head."

Kilpatrick's brother Edwin E. Kilpatrick moved to Australia and became a leading showman, accumulating a fortune. His wife Kintchie Kilpatrick would be described as the wealthiest woman in Australia prior to her death in February 1917.

== Sources ==
- McKenna, B. (2010) Clark Griffith: Baseball's Statesman, Lulu. ISBN 9780557472956.
- Olinskey, J. & Topi, D. (2012) Kansas City's Fairmount Park, Vintage Antique Classics Publishing: Kansas City. ISBN 978 0 9823 5271 7.
- Smiles, J. (2007) Big Ed Walsh: The Life and Times of a Spitballing Hall of Famer, McFarland: Jefferson, North Carolina. ISBN 978-0-7864-3278-3.
- Ward, A. "Early Editors and Newspapers of Vermilion County", Journal of the Illinois State Historical Society, Vol. 25, No. 4 (Jan., 1933).
