= Charles Kilpatrick (politician) =

The Hon Charles Kilpatrick
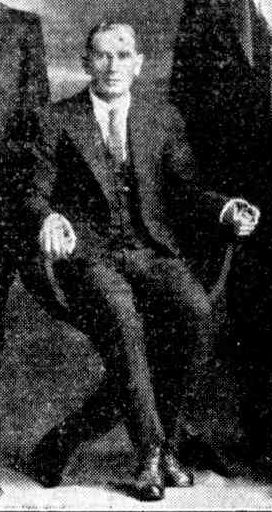
- Charles Kilpatrick, 1925

Member of the Queensland Legislative Council
- In office 19 February 1920 – 23 March 1922

Personal details
- Born: Charles Kilpatrick; 1872 Pollokshaws, Glasgow, Scotland
- Died: 28 May 1935 (aged 62 or 63) Ipswich, Queensland, Australia
- Resting place: Ipswich General Cemetery
- Party: Labor
- Spouse: Marion Rodger (d.1956)
- Occupation: Trade union representative

Charles Kilpatrick (1872 – 28 May 1935) was a trade union president and member the Queensland Legislative Council.

== Early life ==
Kilpatrick was born at Pollokshaws, Glasgow, Scotland, to John Kilpatrick his wife Annie (née McKenzie). He spent his entire working life involved in mining, both as a miner, and then in the trade union representing them.

== Political career ==
When the Labour Party starting forming governments in Queensland, it found much of its legislation being blocked by a hostile Council, where members had been appointed for life by successive conservative governments. After a failed referendum in May 1917, Premier Ryan tried a new tactic, and later that year advised the Governor, Sir Hamilton John Goold-Adams, to appoint thirteen new members whose allegiance lay with Labour to the council.

In 1920, the new Premier Ted Theodore appointed a further fourteen new members to the Council with Kilpatrick amongst the appointees. He served for two years until the council was abolished in March 1922.

== Personal life ==
Kilpatrick married Marion Rodger at Larkhall, South Lanarkshire and together had nine children.

He died in Ipswich, Queensland in May 1935 and was buried at Ipswich General Cemetery.
