= Ipswich General Cemetery =

Old cemetery in Ipswich, Queensland, Australia

Coordinates: 27.6325°S 152.7613°E

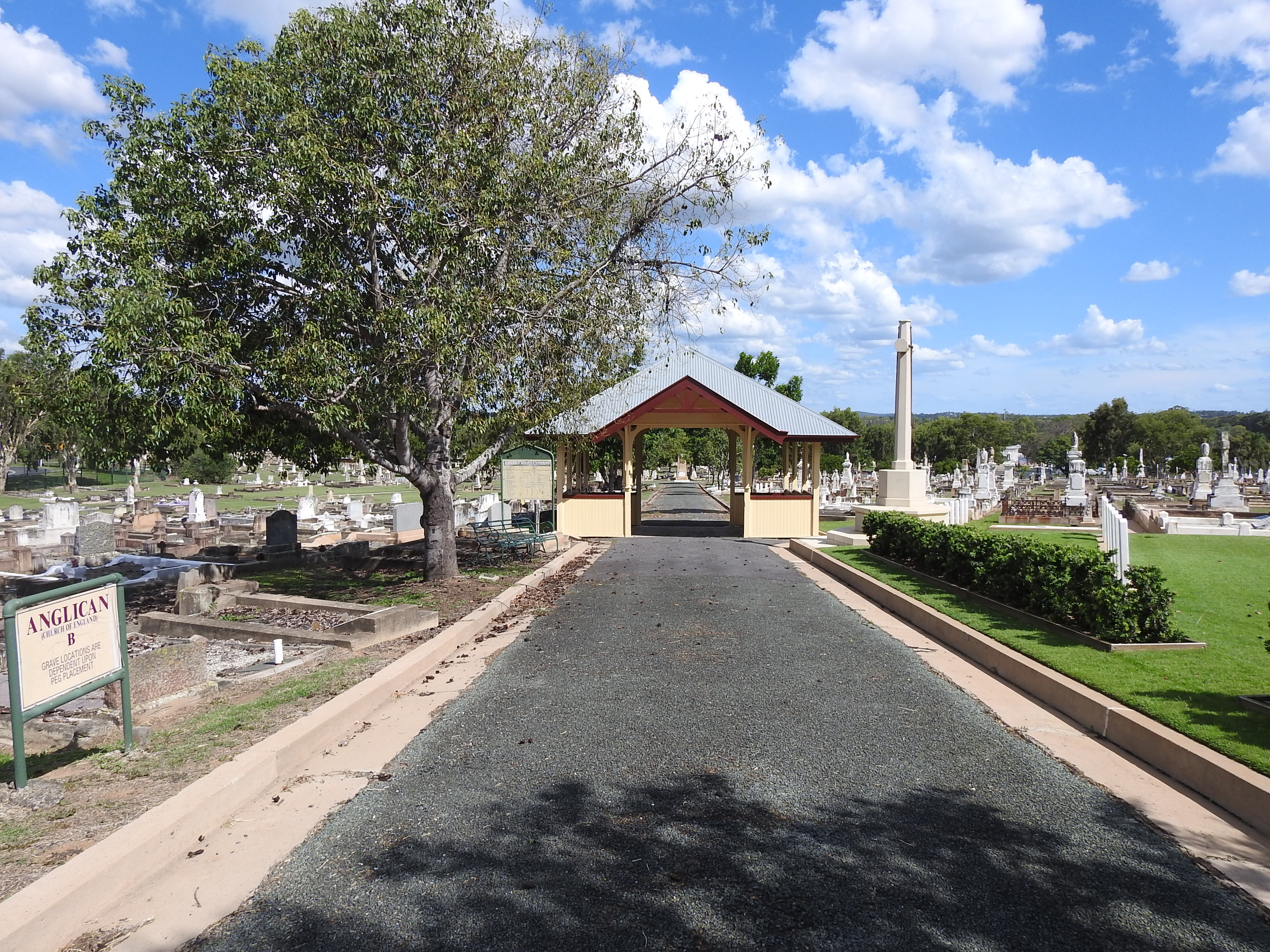
Driveway, shelter, from the north-west corner (2021).

The Ipswich General Cemetery is a historic cemetery in Ipswich, Queensland, Australia. It is the second oldest cemetery in Queensland.

It is owned by Ipswich City Council, but the council have outsourced the day-to-day operations to a private contractor Norwood Park Limited, trading as Ipswich Cemeteries.

== Geography ==
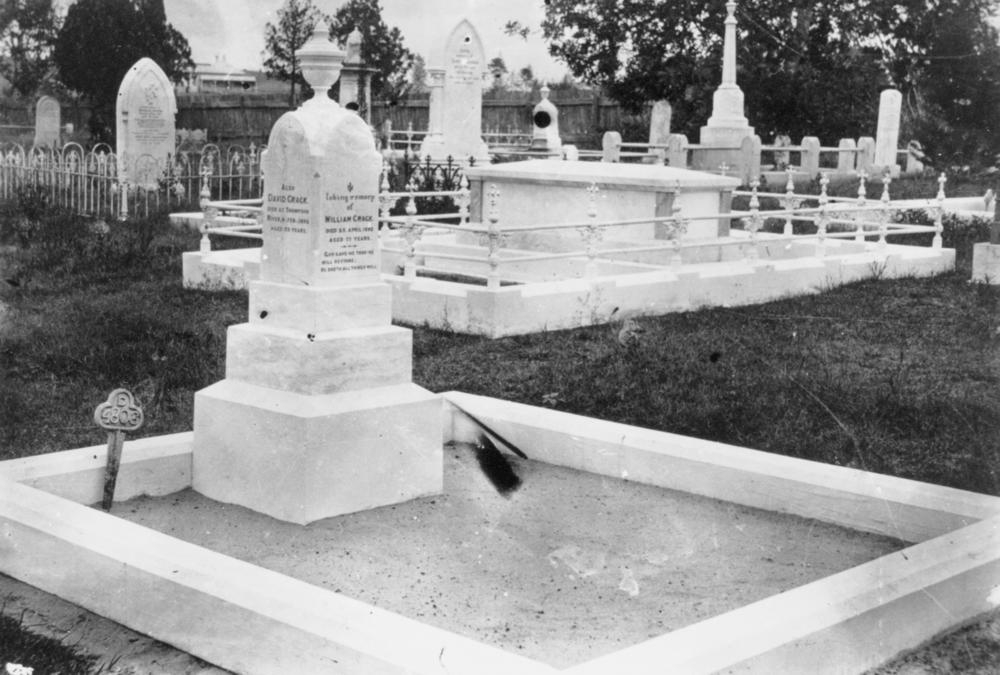
Crack Family grave stone, Ipswich General Cemetery

The cemetery is bounded by Warwick Road, Cooney Street, Parrott Street, Briggs Road and Cemetery Road. It is a denominational cemetery with sections allocated to Roman Catholic Church, Church of England, Methodist Church, Presbyterian Church, Congregational Church, Baptist Church, Lutheran Church, Christadelphian Church and Salvation Army. In addition, there are areas for pioneer graves and war graves.

The Australian forces war graves (comprising 64 army and 24 air force personnel) are on a triangular plot, dominated by a Cross of Sacrifice. Here are buried 12 personnel from World War I and 88 from World War II.

== History ==
The first recorded burial in the cemetery was four-year-old John Carr on 20 July 1868. However, recent investigations using metal detectors have located a number of undocumented graves in the pioneer section of the cemetery which may date back to the 1840s.

== Current use ==
The cemetery is closed to new burials, but burials can take place in existing family graves. Cremated remains can be placed in the columbarium wall or placed in family graves.

== Notable people interred ==
- Bridget Kate and Mary Jane Broderick (–1891), the subject of Henry Lawson's poem The Babies of Walloon.
- Thomas "Tom" Rees Thomas (1910–1993), Australian Congregationalist minister.
- James Ryan (–1948), who alleged he was bushranger Dan Kelly (1861–1880).

Politicians

- John Alexander Bell (1829–1901), pastoralist, and member of the Queensland Legislative Council.
- Benjamin Cribb (1807–1874), retail businessman, and member of both the New South Wales and Queensland legislative assemblies.
- James Clarke Cribb (1856–1926), businessman, and member of the Queensland Legislative Assembly.
- James Donald (1895–1976), union organiser, and member of the Queensland Legislative Assembly.
- Joseph Fleming (1811–1891), pastoralist, and member of the Queensland Legislative Assembly.
- James Foote (1829–1895), grocer and ironmonger, and member of the Queensland Legislative Assembly, and major of Borough of Ipswich.
- John Clarke Foote (1822–1895), department store owner, first mayor of Ipswich (and again), and appointed lifetime member of the Queensland Legislative Council (brother of James).
- Josiah Francis (1825–1891), miner, mayor of Ipswich (twice), and member of the Queensland Legislative Assembly.
- David Alexander Gledson (1877–1949), accountant, unionist, and member of the Queensland Legislative Assembly.
- John Johnston (1823–1872), miner, and member of the Queensland Legislative Assembly.
- Ellen Violet Jordan (1913–1982), member of the Queensland Legislative Assembly (and second-elected woman).
- Denis Thomas Keogh (1838–1911), auctioneer, storekeeper, mayor of Ipswich, and member of the Queensland Legislative Assembly.
- Charles Kilpatrick (1872–1935), trade union president, and member of the Queensland Legislative Council.
- John MacFarlane (1829–1894), draper, temperance movement founder, mayor of Ipswich, and member of the Queensland Legislative Assembly.
- John Murphy (1820–1883), store manager, mayor of Ipswich, and member of the Queensland Legislative Assembly.
- Francis North (1811–1864), member of the Queensland Legislative Council.
- Patrick O'Sullivan (1818–1904), soldier, convict, storekeeper, and member of the Queensland Legislative Assembly.
- John Panton (1815–1866), member of both the New South Wales and Queensland legislative assemblies.
- John Pettigrew (1832–1878), storekeeper, mayor of Ipswich, and member of the Queensland Legislative Assembly.
- Samuel Shenton (1829–1893), architect, and mayor of Ipswich (twice).
- Alexander James Skinner (1910–1968), clerk, and member of the Queensland Legislative Assembly.
- Richard Joseph Smith (1819–1883), member of the New South Wales and Queensland legislative council.
- Alfred John Stephenson (1845–1914), proprietor of the Queensland Times newspaper, and member of both the Queensland legislative council and assembly.
- William Henry Summerville (1862–1919), solicitor, mayor of Ipswich, and member of the Queensland Legislative Assembly.
- Lewis Thomas (1832–1913), colliery owner, and member of both the Queensland legislative council and assembly.
- George Thorn (senior) (1806–1876), father of Ipswich, and member of the Queensland Legislative Assembly.
- George Thorn (1838–1905), Premier of Queensland (son of George snr).
- Henry Thorn (1840–1880), member of the Queensland Legislative Assembly (son of George snr).

== See also ==
- Burials at Ipswich General Cemetery

== Gallery ==
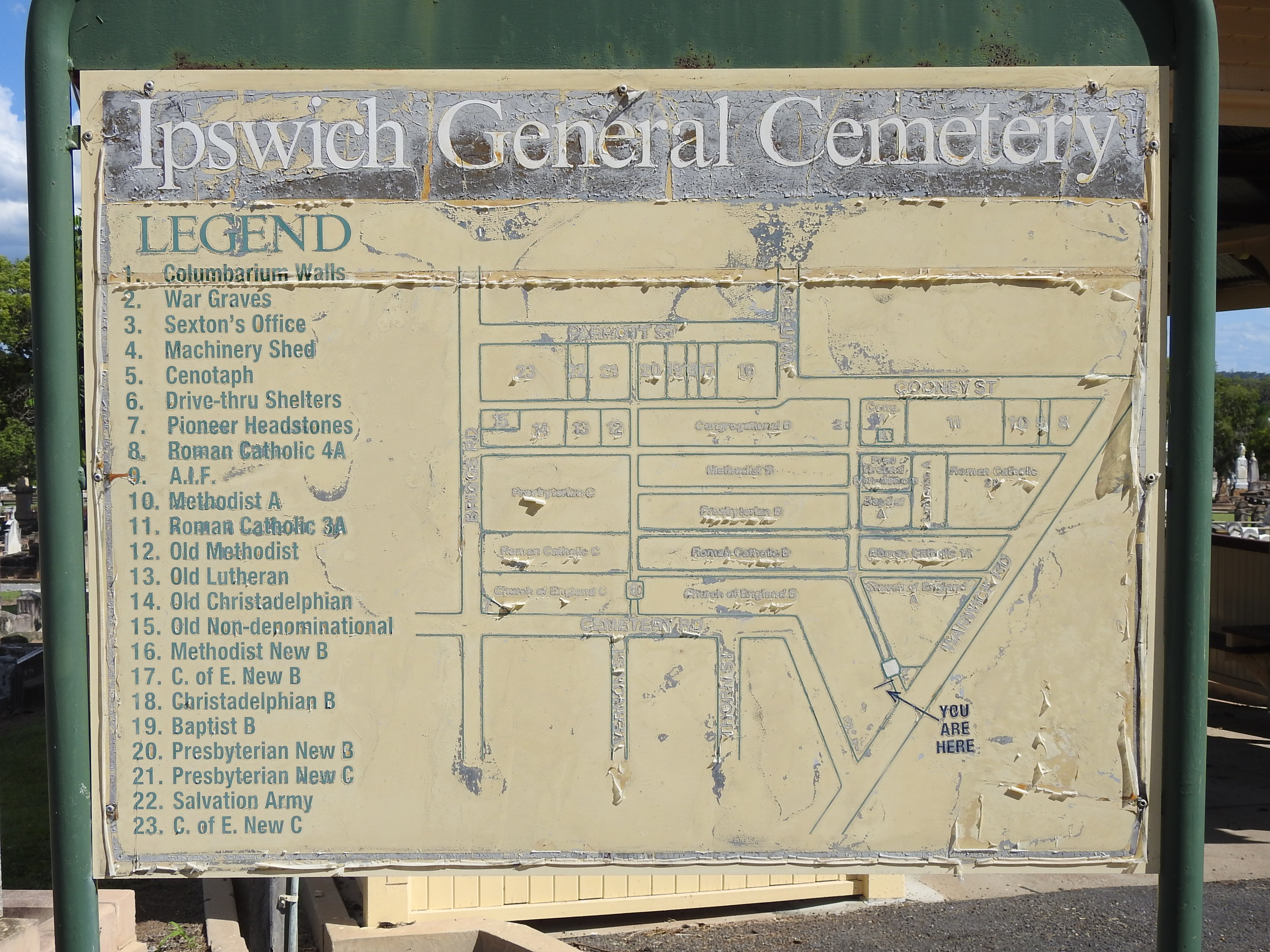
Map of the cemetery

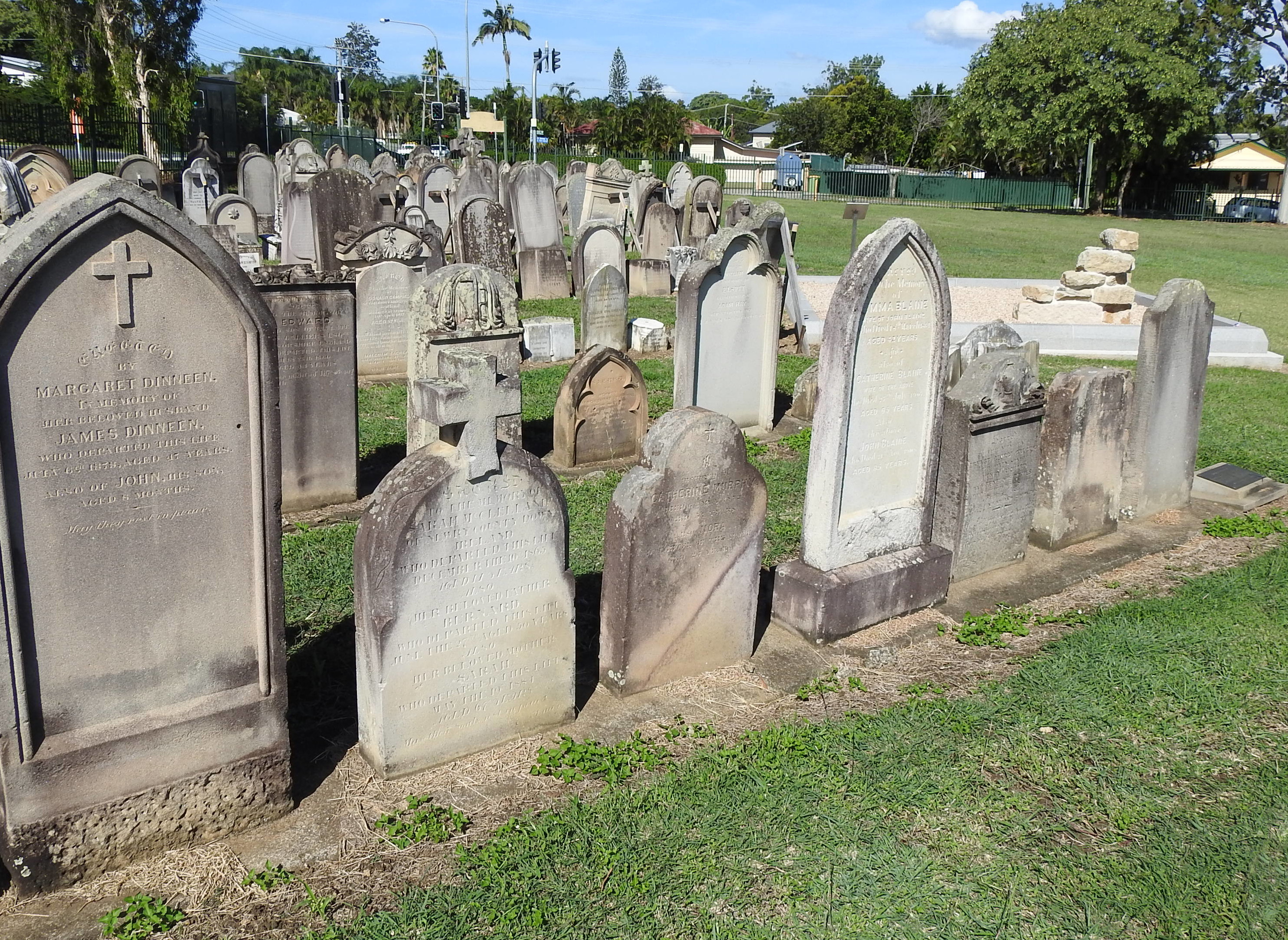
Old pioneer graves (mid-1850s)

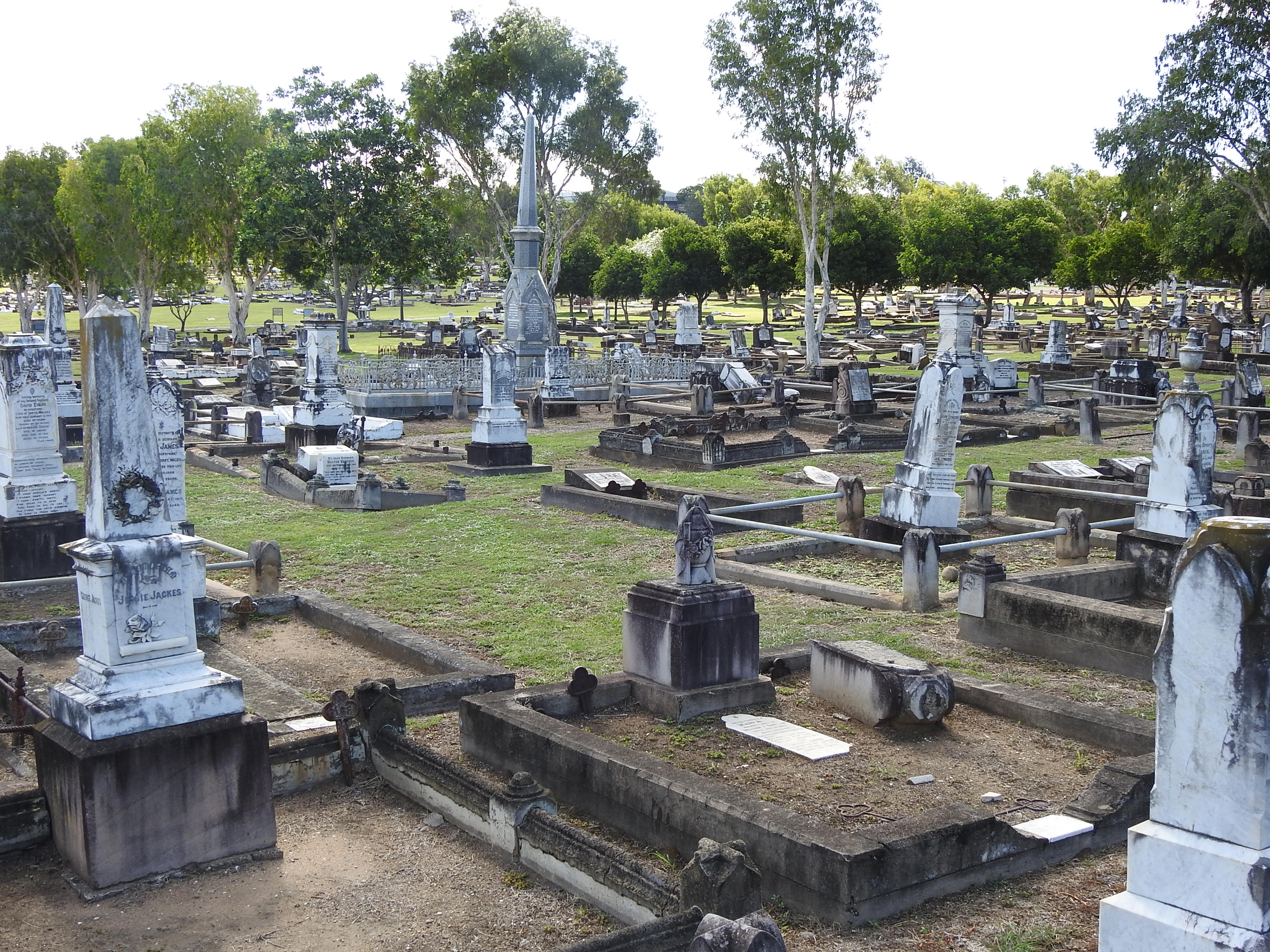
Congregational graves section

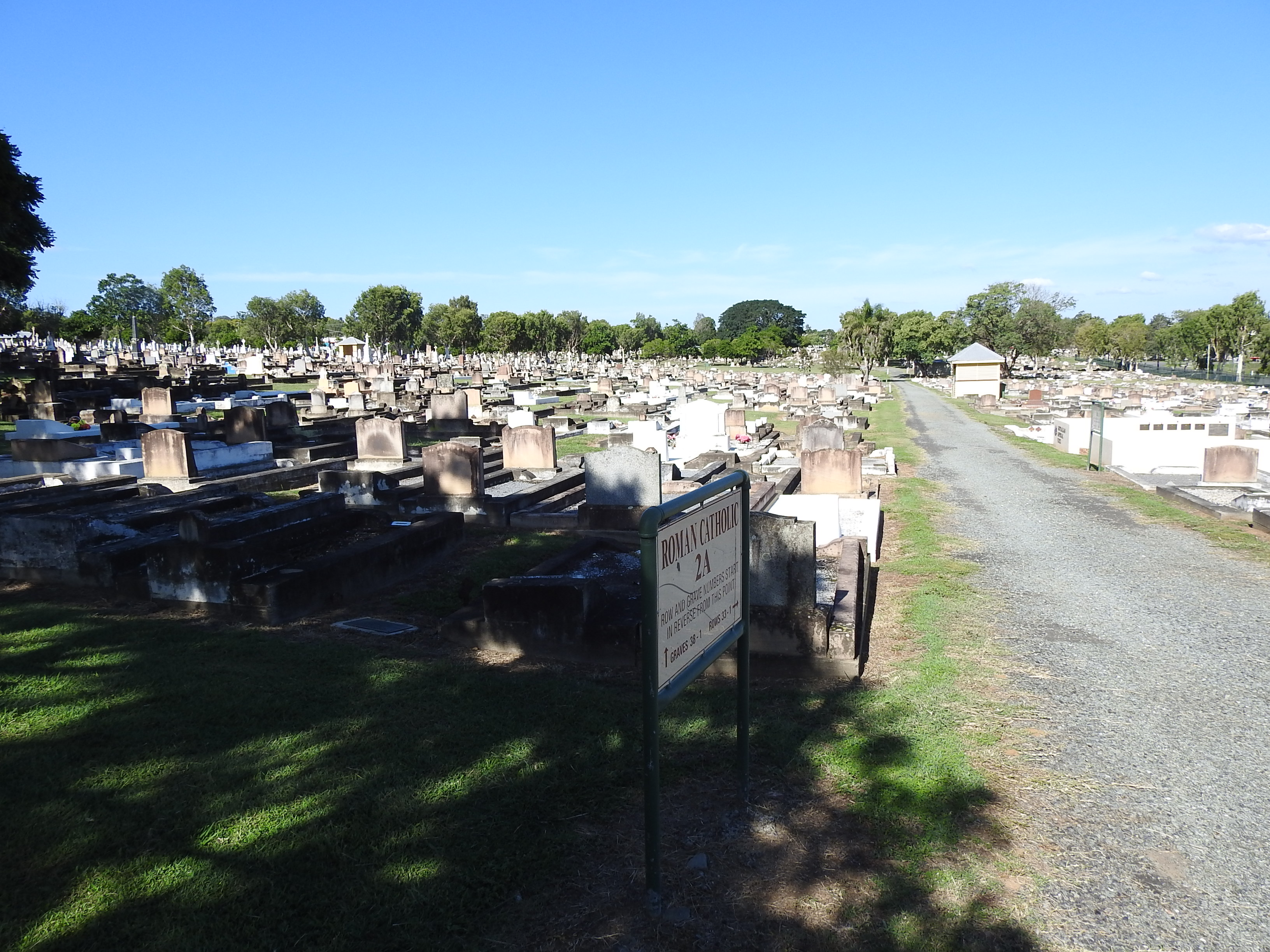
Looking east from the western entrance off Warwick Road

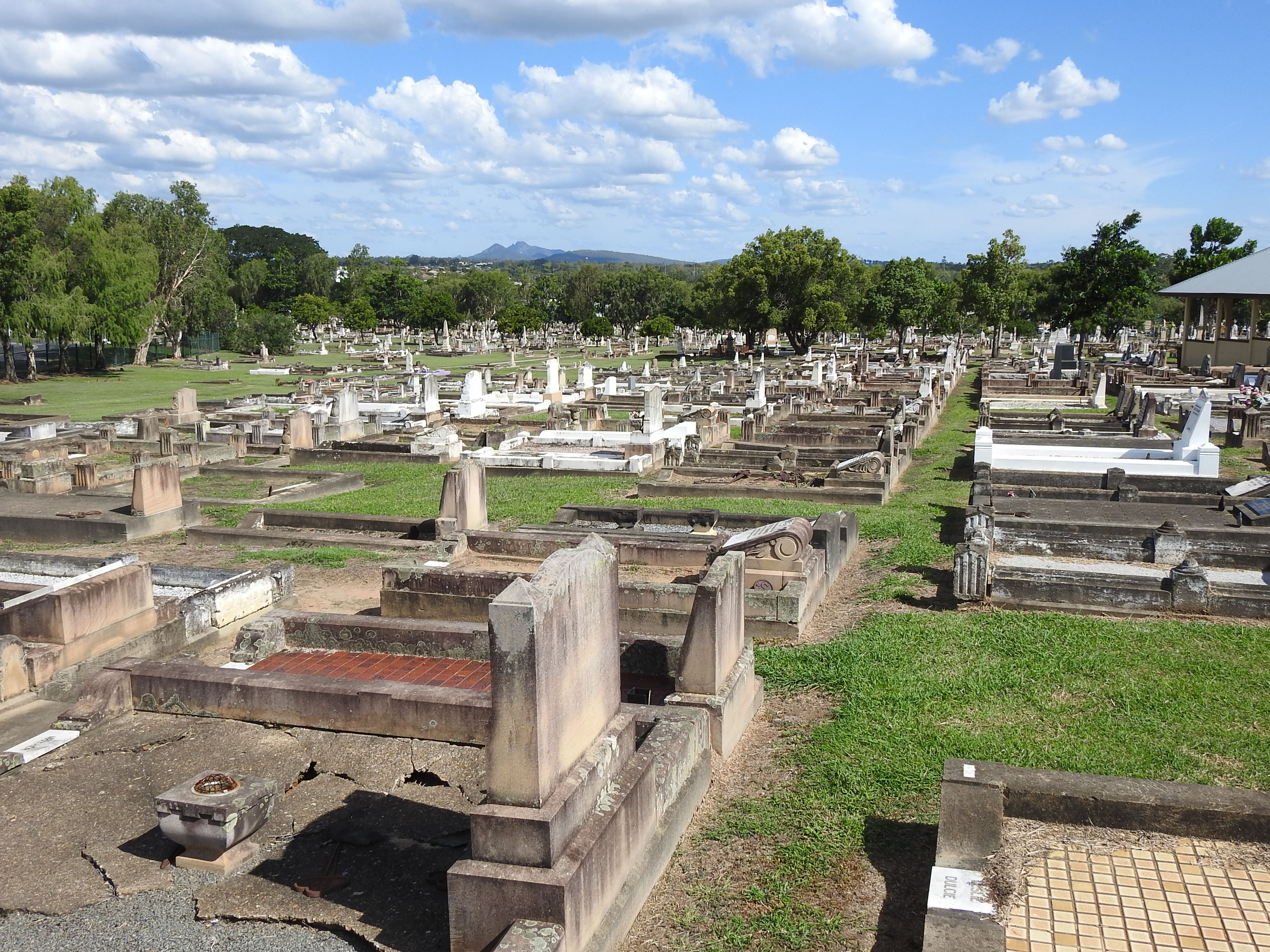
Looking north-west to south-east

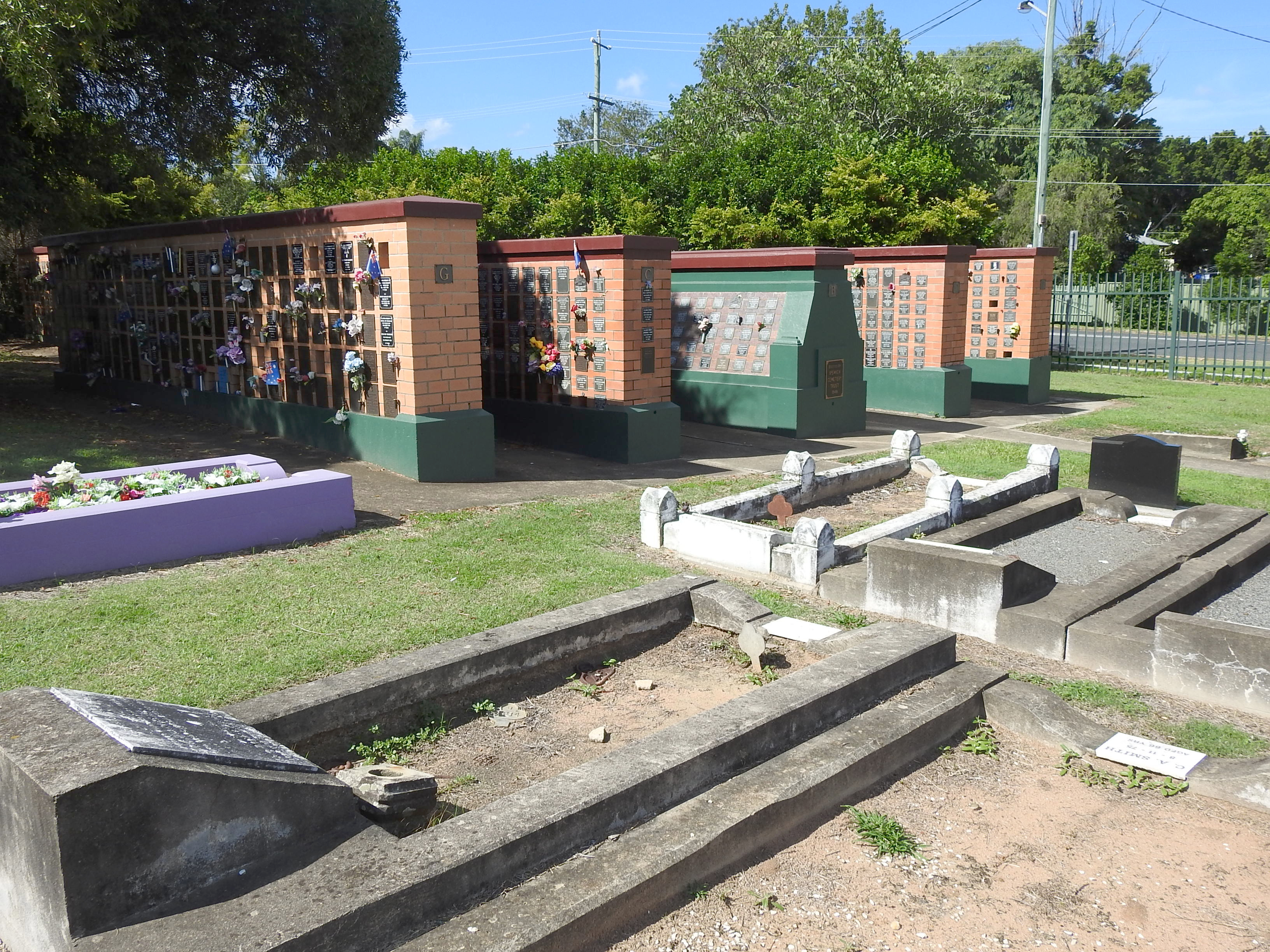
Columbariums

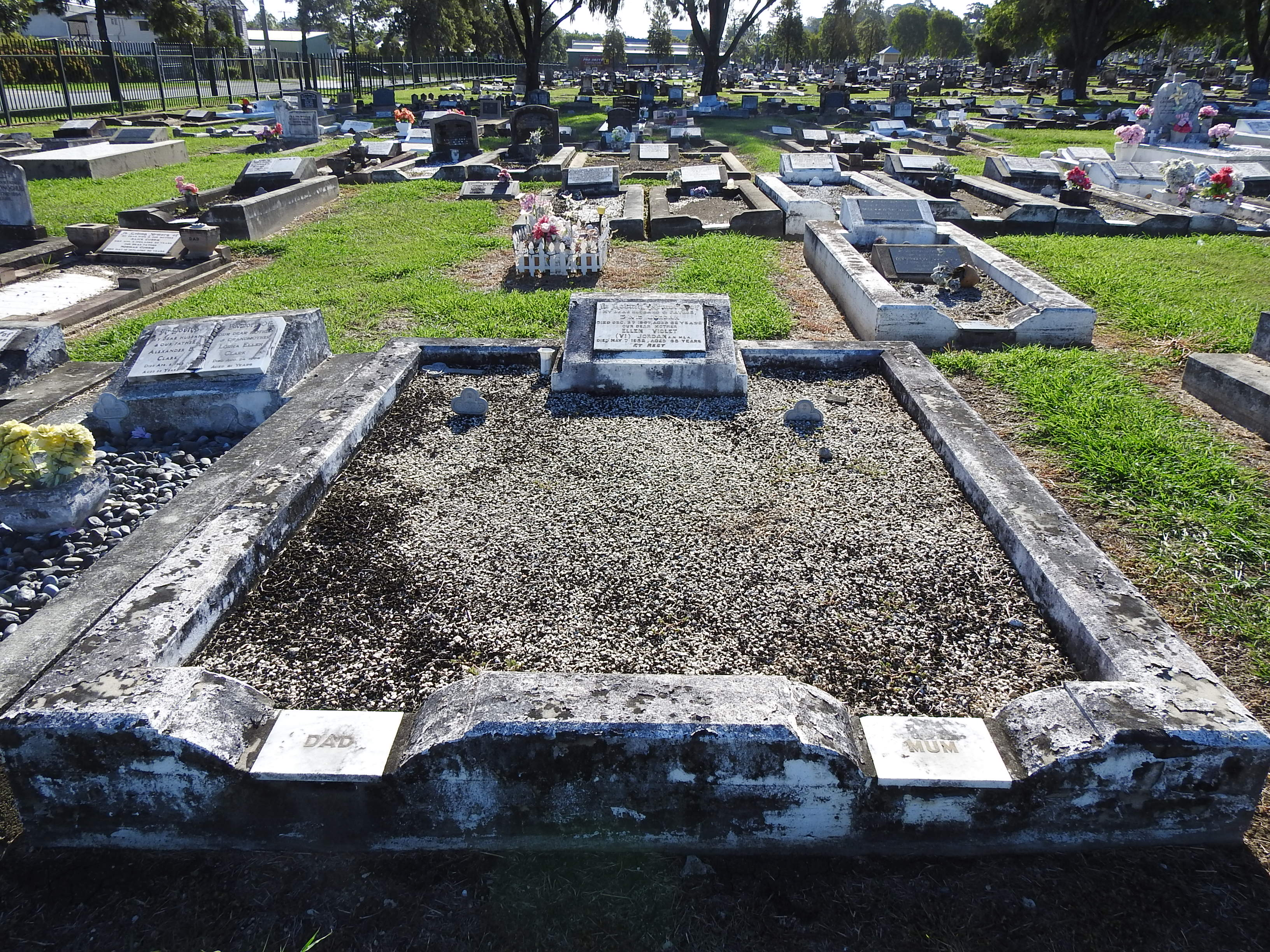
Grave plot of Ellen Violet Jordan

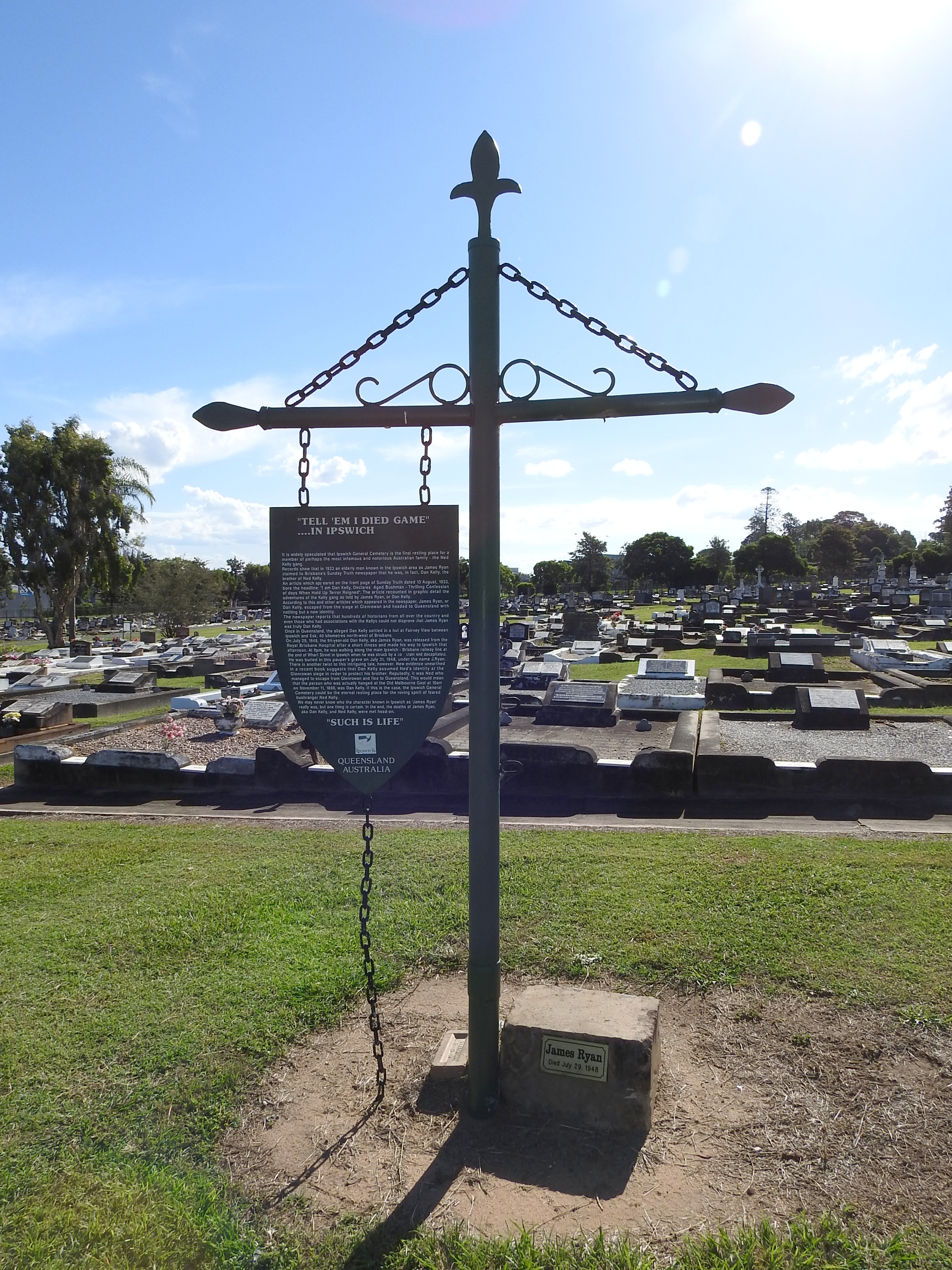
Gravestone and information sign of James Ryan

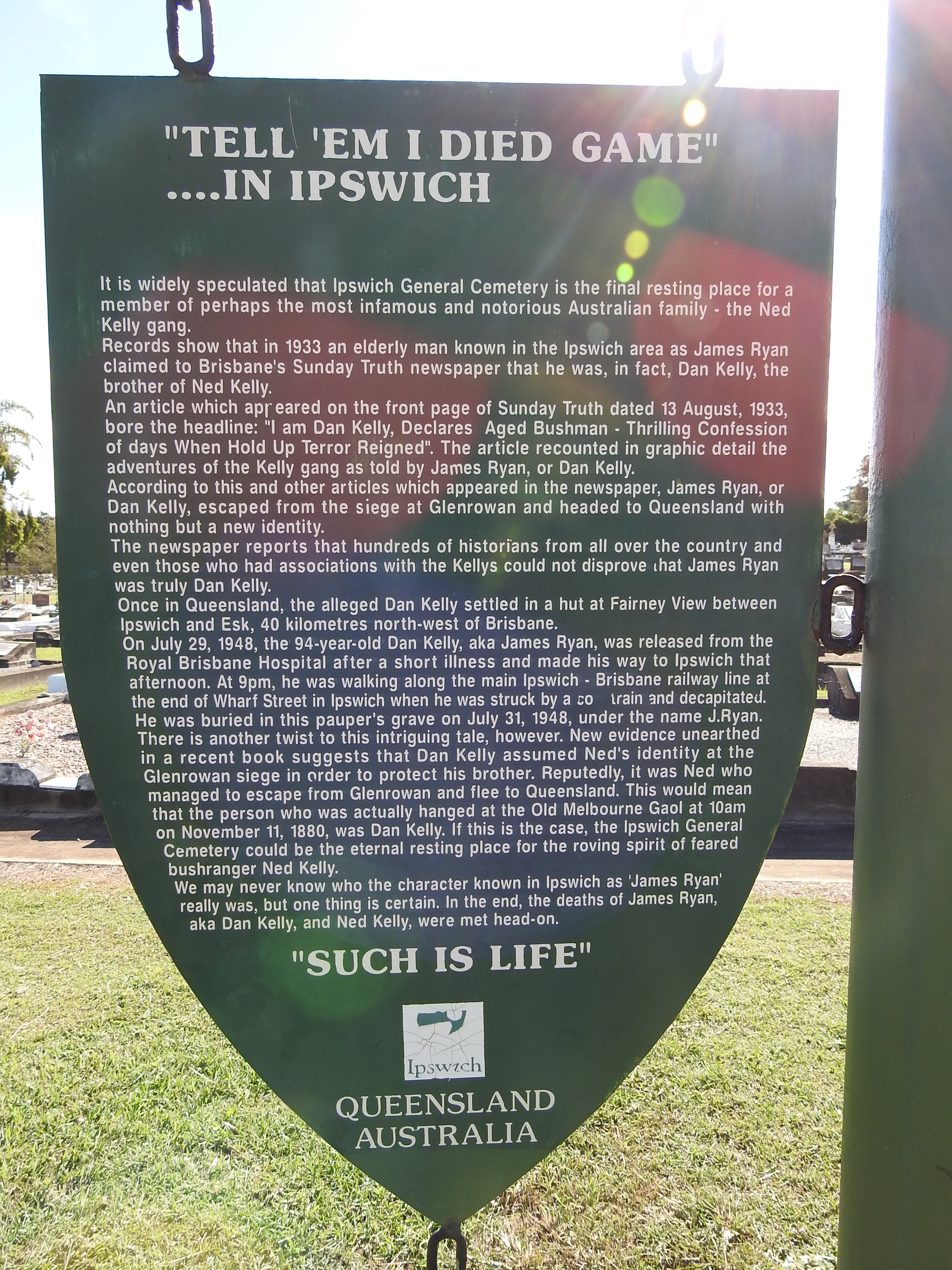
Information sign of James Ryan
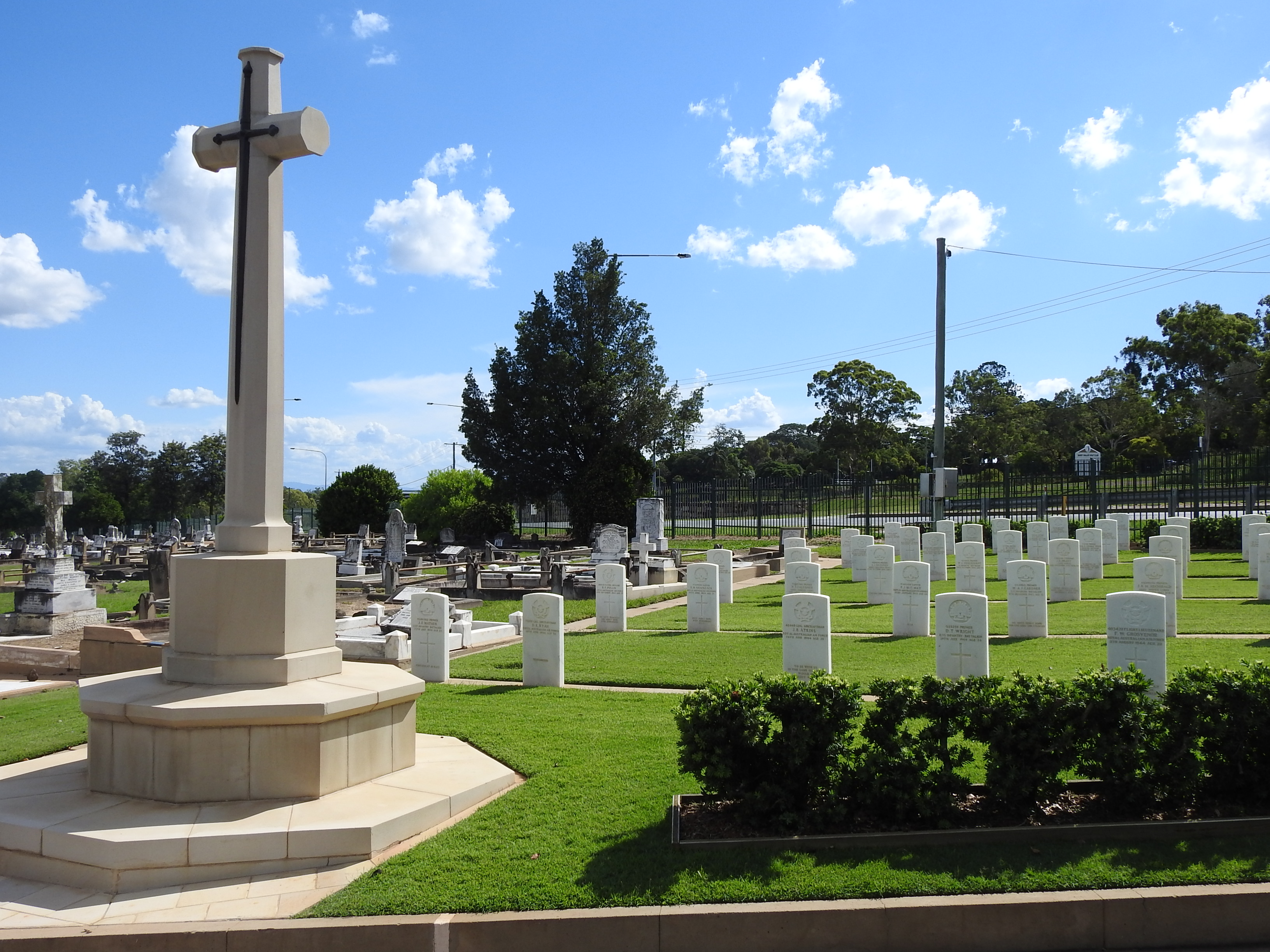
War graves section

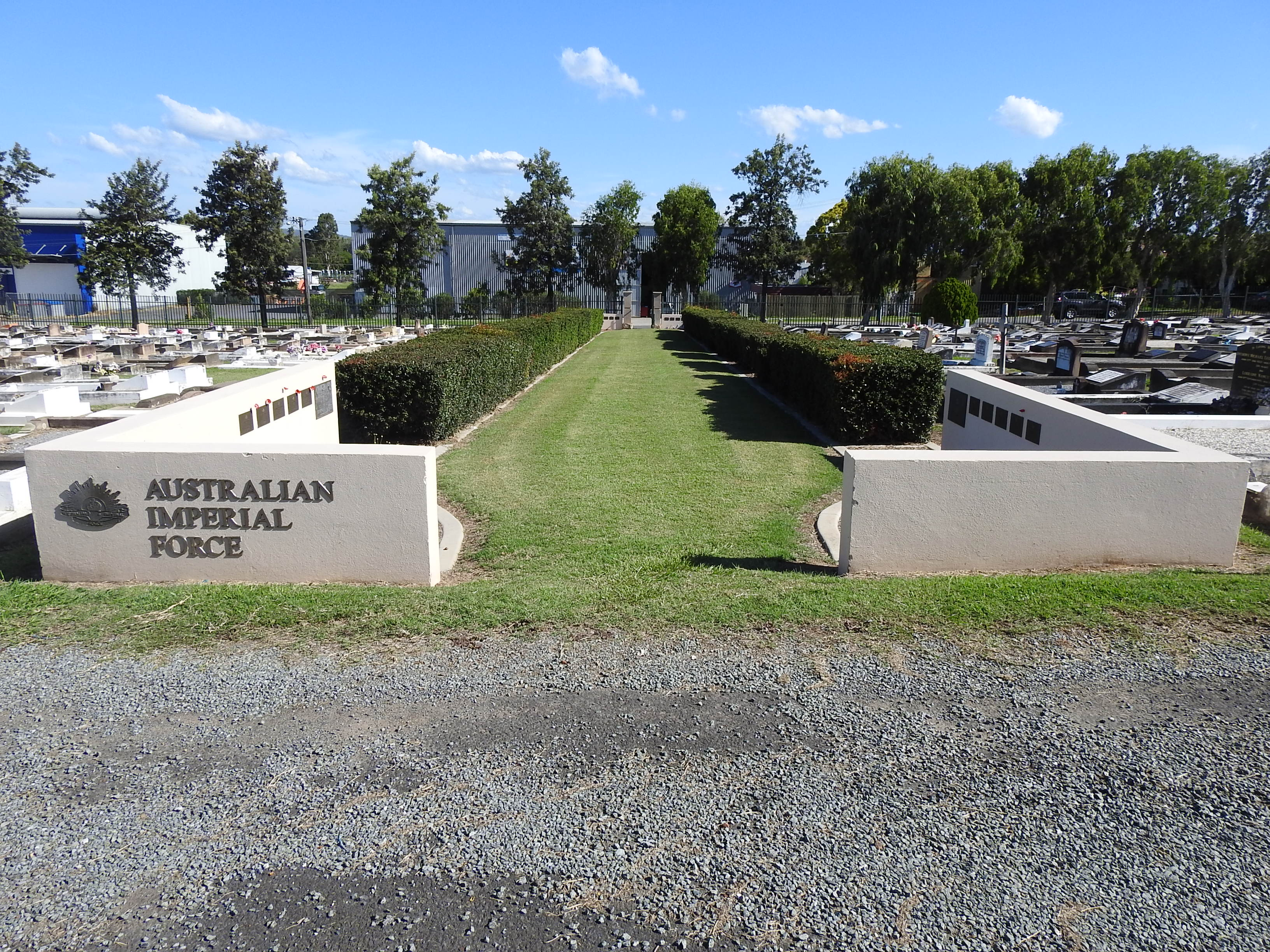
Australian Imperial Forces memorial section
