= John MacFarlane (Ipswich) =

Australian politician

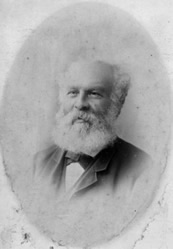

Member of the Queensland Legislative Assembly for Ipswich
- In office 7 March 1878 – 7 March 1894 Serving with John Thompson, Josiah Francis, William Salkeld, Andrew Barlow
- Preceded by: New seat
- Succeeded by: Alfred Stephenson

Personal details
- Born: John MacFarlane; 2 June 1829 Glasgow, Scotland
- Died: 7 March 1894 (aged 64) Sandgate, Queensland, Australia
- Resting place: Ipswich General Cemetery
- Party: Ministerial
- Spouse: Margaret McKenzie (m.1849 d.1900)
- Occupation: Draper

John MacFarlane (2 June 1829 – 7 March 1894) was a draper and member of the Queensland Legislative Assembly.

== Biography ==
MacFarlane was born at Glasgow, Scotland, to father John Macfarlane his wife Agnes (née Housten). After receiving his education at parish schools in Glasgow he arrived in Queensland aboard the Helenslee in 1862 and became a store keeper with Cribb & Foote in Ipswich. He was then a draper at Greenham & Bennett before becoming a director with Woollen Co. from 1875 until 1894.

He married Margaret McKenzie (died 1900) and had four sons and two daughters. MacFarlane died March 1894 and his funeral proceeded from his Denmark Hill residence to the Ipswich General Cemetery.

== Public career ==
MacFarlane was an alderman in Ipswich including the town's mayor in 1876. From 1878 until his death in 1894 he was the member for Ipswich in the Queensland Legislative Assembly.

He was a member of the Ipswich Hospital Board. Having abstained from alcohol all his life, he founded the temperance movement in Ipswich and was a member of the Independent Order of Rechabites.

Parliament of Queensland
New seat	Member for Ipswich; 1881–1883; Served alongside: John Thompson, Josiah Francis, William Salkeld, Andrew Barlow	Succeeded by Alfred Stephenson
