= Electoral results for the district of Maryborough =

Queensland, Australia, district election results

This is a list of electoral results for the electoral district of Maryborough in Queensland state elections.

== Members for Maryborough ==
Single member electorate (1865–1878)
| Member | Party | Term |
|---|---|---|
| William Henry Walsh | Squatter conservative | 1865–1873 |
| Berkeley Basil Moreton | Independent Liberal | 1873–1875 |
| John Douglas | Independent Liberal | 1875–1878 |

Dual member electorate (1878–1912)
| Member | Party | Term | Member | Party | Term |
|---|---|---|---|---|---|
| John Douglas | Independent Liberal | 1878–1880 | Henry Edward King | McIlwraith conservative | 1878–1883 |
| Henry Palmer | McIlwraith conservative | 1880–1883 | Henry Edward King | McIlwraith conservative | 1878–1883 |
| John Hurley | Unaligned | 1883–1884 | Richard Bingham Sheridan | Liberal Party | 1883–1888 |
| John Annear | Ministerialist | 1884–1902 | Richard Bingham Sheridan | Liberal Party | 1883–1888 |
| John Annear | Ministerialist | 1884–1902 | Richard Hyne | Unaligned | 1888–1893 |
| John Annear | Ministerialist | 1884–1902 | Charles Powers | Opposition | 1893–1896 |
| John Annear | Ministerialist | 1884–1902 | John Bartholomew | Ministerialist | 1896–1902 |
| Charles Barton | Labor | 1902–1902 | John Norman | Labor | 1902–1907 |
| Henry Garde | Ministerialist | 1902–1904 | John Norman | Labor | 1902–1907 |
| William Mitchell | Labor | 1904–1909 | John Norman | Labor | 1902–1907 |
| William Mitchell | Labor | 1904–1909 | John Adamson | Labor | 1907–1909 |
| Charles Booker | Ministerialist | 1909–1912 | Edward Corser | Ministerialist | 1909–1912 |

Single member electorate (1912–present)
| Member | Party | Term |
|---|---|---|
| Edward Corser | Ministerialist | 1912–1915 |
| Alfred Jones | Labor | 1915–1917 |
| David Weir | Labor | 1917–1929 |
| John Blackley | Country and Progressive National | 1929–1932 |
| James Stopford | Labor | 1932–1936 |
| William Demaine | Labor | 1937–1938 |
| David Farrell | Labor | 1938–1953 |
| Horace Davies | Labor | 1953–1971 |
| Gilbert Alison | Liberal | 1971–1977 |
| Brendan Hansen | Labor | 1977–1983 |
| Gilbert Alison | National | 1983–1989 |
| Bob Dollin | Labor | 1989–1998 |
| John Kingston | One Nation | 1998–1999 |
| John Kingston | Independent | 1999–2003 |
| Chris Foley | Independent | 2003–2012 |
| Anne Maddern | Liberal National | 2012–2015 |
| Bruce Saunders | Labor | 2015–2024 |
| John Barounis | Liberal National | 2024–present |

== Election results ==
=== Elections in the 2020s ===
2024 Queensland state election: Maryborough
| Party | Candidate | Votes | % | ±% |
|---|---|---|---|---|
| Labor | Bruce Saunders | 14,336 | 38.63 | −14.64 |
| Liberal National | John Barounis | 13,593 | 36.63 | +10.33 |
| One Nation | Taryn Gillard | 5,702 | 15.37 | +2.19 |
| Greens | Lauren Granger-Brown | 1,323 | 3.56 | +0.90 |
| Family First | Kerry Petrus | 904 | 2.44 | +2.44 |
| Independent | Jamie Miller | 811 | 2.19 | +2.19 |
| Independent | Daniel James Beattie | 439 | 1.18 | +1.18 |
| Total formal votes | | 37,108 | 95.13 | −1.13 |
| Informal votes | | 1,899 | 4.87 | +1.13 |
| Turnout | | 39,007 | 90.46 | +0.00 |
Two-party-preferred result
| Liberal National | John Barounis | 19,609 | 52.84 | +14.73 |
| Labor | Bruce Saunders | 17,499 | 47.16 | −14.73 |
| Liberal National gain from Labor | | Swing | +14.73 | |

2020 Queensland state election: Maryborough
| Party | Candidate | Votes | % | ±% |
|---|---|---|---|---|
| Labor | Bruce Saunders | 17,751 | 53.27 | +8.08 |
| Liberal National | Denis Chapman | 8,763 | 26.30 | +8.26 |
| One Nation | Sharon Lohse | 4,392 | 13.18 | −17.18 |
| Greens | Craig Armstrong | 888 | 2.66 | −0.84 |
| Legalise Cannabis | River Body | 885 | 2.66 | +2.66 |
| Informed Medical Options | Samantha Packer | 452 | 1.36 | +1.36 |
| United Australia | Alex Sokolov | 194 | 0.58 | +0.58 |
| Total formal votes | | 33,325 | 96.26 | +0.05 |
| Informal votes | | 1,293 | 3.74 | −0.05 |
| Turnout | | 34,618 | 90.46 | +0.00 |
Two-party-preferred result
| Labor | Bruce Saunders | 20,624 | 61.89 | +9.43 |
| Liberal National | Denis Chapman | 12,701 | 38.11 | +38.11 |
| Labor hold | | Swing | +9.43 | |

=== Elections in the 2010s ===
2017 Queensland state election: Maryborough
| Party | Candidate | Votes | % | ±% |
|---|---|---|---|---|
| Labor | Bruce Saunders | 14,208 | 45.2 | +19.4 |
| One Nation | James Hansen | 9,546 | 30.4 | +23.7 |
| Liberal National | Richard Kingston | 5,671 | 18.0 | −13.7 |
| Greens | Craig Armstrong | 1,102 | 3.5 | +1.1 |
| Independent | Roger Currie | 919 | 2.9 | +2.9 |
| Total formal votes | | 31,446 | 96.2 | −1.8 |
| Informal votes | | 1,237 | 3.8 | +1.8 |
| Turnout | | 32,683 | 90.5 | +2.5 |
Two-candidate-preferred result
| Labor | Bruce Saunders | 16,497 | 52.46 | +1.4 |
| One Nation | James Hansen | 14,949 | 47.54 | +47.5 |
| Labor hold | | Swing | +1.4 | |

2015 Queensland state election: Maryborough
| Party | Candidate | Votes | % | ±% |
|---|---|---|---|---|
| Liberal National | Anne Maddern | 9,702 | 30.56 | −5.19 |
| Labor | Bruce Saunders | 8,031 | 25.29 | +13.52 |
| Independent | Chris Foley | 6,749 | 21.26 | −8.92 |
| Palmer United | Stephen Anderson | 3,931 | 12.38 | +12.38 |
| One Nation | Damian Huxham | 2,217 | 6.98 | +6.98 |
| Greens | Katherine Webb | 813 | 2.56 | −0.20 |
| Independent | Russell Wattie | 309 | 0.97 | +0.97 |
| Total formal votes | | 31,752 | 98.05 | +0.09 |
| Informal votes | | 630 | 1.95 | −0.09 |
| Turnout | | 32,382 | 92.02 | −0.51 |
Two-party-preferred result
| Labor | Bruce Saunders | 12,723 | 51.65 | +1.96 |
| Liberal National | Anne Maddern | 11,910 | 48.35 | −1.96 |
| Labor gain from Liberal National | | Swing | | |

2012 Queensland state election: Maryborough
| Party | Candidate | Votes | % | ±% |
|---|---|---|---|---|
| Liberal National | Anne Maddern | 10,745 | 35.74 | +9.97 |
| Independent | Chris Foley | 9,071 | 30.17 | −17.50 |
| Katter's Australian | Gordon Dale | 5,879 | 19.56 | +19.56 |
| Labor | Ezra Burtt | 3,538 | 11.77 | −11.00 |
| Greens | Garry Claridge | 830 | 2.76 | −1.02 |
| Total formal votes | | 30,063 | 97.96 | −0.09 |
| Informal votes | | 626 | 2.04 | +0.09 |
| Turnout | | 30,689 | 92.53 | −0.48 |
Two-candidate-preferred result
| Liberal National | Anne Maddern | 12,228 | 50.31 | +17.14 |
| Independent | Chris Foley | 12,076 | 49.69 | −17.14 |
| Liberal National gain from Independent | | Swing | +17.14 | |

=== Elections in the 2000s ===
2009 Queensland state election: Maryborough
| Party | Candidate | Votes | % | ±% |
|---|---|---|---|---|
| Independent | Chris Foley | 14,119 | 47.7 | −17.7 |
| Liberal National | Anne Maddern | 7,633 | 25.8 | +13.6 |
| Labor | Brad Hansen | 6,744 | 22.8 | +6.3 |
| Greens | David Arthur | 1,120 | 3.8 | −1.7 |
| Total formal votes | | 29,616 | 97.9 | |
| Informal votes | | 590 | 2.1 | |
| Turnout | | 30,206 | 93.0 | |
Two-candidate-preferred result
| Independent | Chris Foley | 16,586 | 66.8 | −13.6 |
| Liberal National | Anne Maddern | 8,232 | 33.2 | +33.2 |
| Independent hold | | Swing | −13.6 | |

2006 Queensland state election: Maryborough
| Party | Candidate | Votes | % | ±% |
|---|---|---|---|---|
| Independent | Chris Foley | 17,888 | 69.6 | +4.7 |
| Labor | Peter Allen | 3,839 | 14.9 | −15.2 |
| National | Damien Tessmann | 2,580 | 10.0 | +10.0 |
| Greens | Steve Walker | 1,387 | 5.4 | +0.3 |
| Total formal votes | | 25,894 | 98.1 | +0.3 |
| Informal votes | | 502 | 1.9 | −0.3 |
| Turnout | | 26,196 | 92.8 | −1.4 |
Two-candidate-preferred result
| Independent | Chris Foley | 20,044 | 82.7 | +14.7 |
| Labor | Peter Allen | 4,184 | 17.3 | −14.7 |
| Independent hold | | Swing | +14.7 | |

2004 Queensland state election: Maryborough
| Party | Candidate | Votes | % | ±% |
|---|---|---|---|---|
| Independent | Chris Foley | 16,314 | 64.9 | +64.9 |
| Labor | Doug Loggie | 7,556 | 30.1 | −11.9 |
| Greens | Stephen Walker | 1,271 | 5.1 | +5.1 |
| Total formal votes | | 25,141 | 97.8 | +0.2 |
| Informal votes | | 572 | 2.2 | −0.2 |
| Turnout | | 25,713 | 94.2 | −0.9 |
Two-candidate-preferred result
| Independent | Chris Foley | 16,664 | 68.0 | +68.0 |
| Labor | Doug Loggie | 7,849 | 32.0 | −17.5 |
| Independent hold | | Swing | +68.0 | |

2003 Maryborough state by-election
| Party | Candidate | Votes | % | ±% |
|---|---|---|---|---|
| Labor | Doug Loggie | 8,465 | 37.02 | −4.99 |
| Independent | Chris Foley | 7,619 | 33.32 | +33.32 |
| National | Peter Andrews | 3,925 | 17.16 | +2.61 |
| One Nation | Brad Marsh | 1,679 | 7.34 | +7.34 |
| Greens | Dean Pratley | 775 | 3.39 | +3.39 |
| Independent | Ray Smith | 179 | 0.78 | −1.49 |
| Independent | John Ahearn | 174 | 0.76 | +0.76 |
| Independent | Jeremy Roberts | 51 | 0.22 | +0.22 |
| Total formal votes | | 22,867 | 97.91 | +0.28 |
| Informal votes | | 488 | 2.09 | −0.28 |
| Turnout | | 23,355 | 88.08 | −7.06 |
Two-candidate-preferred result
| Independent | Chris Foley | 10,484 | 53.51 | +53.51 |
| Labor | Doug Loggie | 9,109 | 46.49 | −3.01 |
| Independent hold | | Swing | N/A | |

2001 Queensland state election: Maryborough
| Party | Candidate | Votes | % | ±% |
|---|---|---|---|---|
| Labor | Alan Holmes | 10,081 | 42.0 | +6.6 |
| Independent | John Kingston | 8,034 | 33.5 | +33.5 |
| National | Linda Harris | 3,492 | 14.6 | −4.2 |
| City Country Alliance | Debbie Douglas | 1,844 | 7.7 | +7.7 |
| Independent | Ray Smith | 545 | 2.3 | +2.3 |
| Total formal votes | | 23,996 | 97.6 | |
| Informal votes | | 582 | 2.4 | |
| Turnout | | 24,578 | 95.1 | |
Two-candidate-preferred result
| Independent | John Kingston | 10,678 | 50.5 | +50.5 |
| Labor | Alan Holmes | 10,466 | 49.5 | +8.0 |
| Independent gain from One Nation | | Swing | +50.5 | |

=== Elections in the 1990s ===
1998 Queensland state election: Maryborough
| Party | Candidate | Votes | % | ±% |
|---|---|---|---|---|
| One Nation | John Kingston | 8,539 | 42.6 | +42.6 |
| Labor | Bob Dollin | 7,163 | 35.7 | −10.7 |
| National | Kev Mahoney | 3,787 | 18.9 | −26.1 |
| Greens | Sue Russell | 576 | 2.9 | +2.9 |
| Total formal votes | | 20,065 | 98.9 | +0.2 |
| Informal votes | | 232 | 1.1 | −0.2 |
| Turnout | | 20,297 | 95.1 | +0.6 |
Two-candidate-preferred result
| One Nation | John Kingston | 11,126 | 58.3 | +58.3 |
| Labor | Bob Dollin | 7,950 | 41.7 | −8.7 |
| One Nation gain from Labor | | Swing | +58.3 | |

1995 Queensland state election: Maryborough
| Party | Candidate | Votes | % | ±% |
|---|---|---|---|---|
| Labor | Bob Dollin | 8,975 | 46.4 | −2.7 |
| National | Lloyd Maddern | 8,704 | 45.0 | +10.2 |
| Democrats | Pamela Howard | 1,678 | 8.7 | +8.7 |
| Total formal votes | | 19,357 | 98.6 | +0.3 |
| Informal votes | | 270 | 1.4 | −0.3 |
| Turnout | | 19,627 | 94.5 | |
Two-party-preferred result
| Labor | Bob Dollin | 9,599 | 50.4 | −2.9 |
| National | Lloyd Maddern | 9,457 | 49.6 | +2.9 |
| Labor hold | | Swing | −2.9 | |

1992 Queensland state election: Maryborough
| Party | Candidate | Votes | % | ±% |
|---|---|---|---|---|
| Labor | Bob Dollin | 9,402 | 49.0 | 0.0 |
| National | Gilbert Alison | 6,674 | 34.8 | −4.7 |
| Confederate Action | Tony Pitt | 3,103 | 16.2 | +16.2 |
| Total formal votes | | 19,179 | 98.3 | |
| Informal votes | | 324 | 1.7 | |
| Turnout | | 19,503 | 94.6 | |
Two-party-preferred result
| Labor | Bob Dollin | 9,919 | 53.3 | +1.9 |
| National | Gilbert Alison | 8,691 | 46.7 | −1.9 |
| Labor hold | | Swing | +1.9 | |

=== Elections in the 1980s ===
1989 Queensland state election: Maryborough
| Party | Candidate | Votes | % | ±% |
|---|---|---|---|---|
| Labor | Bob Dollin | 8,887 | 49.0 | −0.3 |
| National | Gilbert Alison | 7,163 | 39.5 | −11.2 |
| Liberal | Kevin Mahoney | 1,571 | 8.7 | +8.7 |
| Citizens Electoral Council | Camillo Primavera | 529 | 2.9 | +2.9 |
| Total formal votes | | 18,150 | 97.7 | −0.2 |
| Informal votes | | 419 | 2.3 | +0.2 |
| Turnout | | 18,569 | 94.1 | −0.7 |
Two-party-preferred result
| Labor | Bob Dollin | 9,329 | 51.4 | +2.1 |
| National | Gilbert Alison | 8,821 | 48.6 | −2.1 |
| Labor gain from National | | Swing | +2.1 | |

1986 Queensland state election: Maryborough
| Party | Candidate | Votes | % | ±% |
|---|---|---|---|---|
| National | Gilbert Alison | 8,738 | 50.7 | +6.4 |
| Labor | Peter Nightingale | 8,484 | 49.3 | +1.3 |
| Total formal votes | | 17,222 | 97.9 | −1.3 |
| Informal votes | | 369 | 2.1 | +1.3 |
| Turnout | | 17,591 | 94.8 | 0.0 |
| National hold | | Swing | −0.7 | |

1983 Queensland state election: Maryborough
| Party | Candidate | Votes | % | ±% |
|---|---|---|---|---|
| Labor | Peter Nightingale | 7,342 | 48.0 | +0.3 |
| National | Gilbert Alison | 6,769 | 44.3 | +44.3 |
| Liberal | Rodney Bailey | 1,177 | 7.7 | −39.5 |
| Total formal votes | | 15,288 | 99.2 | 0.0 |
| Informal votes | | 118 | 0.8 | 0.0 |
| Turnout | | 15,406 | 94.8 | +2.5 |
Two-party-preferred result
| National | Gilbert Alison | 7,648 | 50.03 | +50.03 |
| Labor | Peter Nightingale | 7,640 | 49.97 | −0.60 |
| National gain from Labor | | Swing | +50.03 | |

1980 Queensland state election: Maryborough
| Party | Candidate | Votes | % | ±% |
|---|---|---|---|---|
| Labor | Brendan Hansen | 6,747 | 47.7 | −2.5 |
| Liberal | Gilbert Alison | 6,676 | 47.2 | −2.6 |
| Democrats | Arthur Townsend | 725 | 5.1 | +5.1 |
| Total formal votes | | 14,148 | 99.2 | +0.2 |
| Informal votes | | 109 | 0.8 | −0.2 |
| Turnout | | 14,257 | 92.3 | −1.5 |
Two-party-preferred result
| Labor | Brendan Hansen | 7,154 | 50.6 | +0.4 |
| Liberal | Gilbert Alison | 6,994 | 49.4 | −0.4 |
| Labor hold | | Swing | +0.4 | |

=== Elections in the 1970s ===
1977 Queensland state election: Maryborough
| Party | Candidate | Votes | % | ±% |
|---|---|---|---|---|
| Labor | Brendan Hansen | 6,930 | 50.2 | +6.3 |
| Liberal | Gilbert Alison | 6,877 | 49.8 | −5.2 |
| Total formal votes | | 13,807 | 99.0 | |
| Informal votes | | 138 | 1.0 | |
| Turnout | | 13,945 | 93.8 | |
| Labor gain from Liberal | | Swing | +6.5 | |

1974 Queensland state election: Maryborough
| Party | Candidate | Votes | % | ±% |
|---|---|---|---|---|
| Liberal | Gilbert Alison | 6,598 | 55.0 | +2.6 |
| Labor | John Anderson | 5,272 | 43.9 | −2.1 |
| Queensland Labor | Matthews Minnegal | 132 | 1.1 | −0.5 |
| Total formal votes | | 12,002 | 99.0 | −0.1 |
| Informal votes | | 124 | 1.0 | +0.1 |
| Turnout | | 12,126 | 93.8 | −1.7 |
Two-party-preferred result
| Liberal | Gilbert Alison | 6,708 | 55.9 | +2.1 |
| Labor | John Anderson | 5,294 | 44.1 | −2.1 |
| Liberal hold | | Swing | +2.1 | |

1972 Queensland state election: Maryborough
| Party | Candidate | Votes | % | ±% |
|---|---|---|---|---|
| Liberal | Gilbert Alison | 5,908 | 52.4 | +14.5 |
| Labor | Edward Weber | 5,184 | 46.0 | −10.5 |
| Queensland Labor | Matthews Minnegal | 186 | 1.6 | −4.0 |
| Total formal votes | | 11,278 | 99.1 | |
| Informal votes | | 100 | 0.9 | |
| Turnout | | 11,378 | 95.5 | |
Two-party-preferred result
| Liberal | Gilbert Alison | 6,063 | 53.8 | +11.3 |
| Labor | Edward Weber | 5,215 | 46.2 | −11.3 |
| Liberal gain from Labor | | Swing | +11.3 | |

=== Elections in the 1960s ===
1969 Queensland state election: Maryborough
| Party | Candidate | Votes | % | ±% |
|---|---|---|---|---|
| Labor | Horace Davies | 6,374 | 56.5 | −4.6 |
| Liberal | Ralph Stafford | 4,282 | 37.9 | +37.9 |
| Queensland Labor | Brian Hawes | 636 | 5.6 | −2.2 |
| Total formal votes | | 11,292 | 98.9 | +0.6 |
| Informal votes | | 126 | 1.1 | −0.6 |
| Turnout | | 11,418 | 94.2 | −0.6 |
Two-party-preferred result
| Labor | Horace Davies | 6,492 | 57.5 | −6.9 |
| Liberal | Ralph Stafford | 4,800 | 42.5 | +6.9 |
| Labor hold | | Swing | −6.9 | |

1966 Queensland state election: Maryborough
| Party | Candidate | Votes | % | ±% |
|---|---|---|---|---|
| Labor | Horace Davies | 6,906 | 61.1 | −0.8 |
| Country | Ernest Jurss | 3,108 | 27.5 | +1.6 |
| Queensland Labor | William Hutchinson | 879 | 7.8 | 0.0 |
| Social Credit | Arnold Jones | 402 | 3.6 | −0.9 |
| Total formal votes | | 11,295 | 98.3 | −0.8 |
| Informal votes | | 196 | 1.7 | +0.8 |
| Turnout | | 11,491 | 94.8 | −0.6 |
Two-party-preferred result
| Labor | Horace Davies | 7,270 | 64.4 | −1.1 |
| Country | Ernest Jurss | 4,025 | 35.6 | +1.1 |
| Labor hold | | Swing | −1.1 | |

1963 Queensland state election: Maryborough
| Party | Candidate | Votes | % | ±% |
|---|---|---|---|---|
| Labor | Horace Davies | 6,758 | 61.9 | −4.4 |
| Country | Robert Hunter | 2,829 | 25.9 | −7.8 |
| Queensland Labor | Vincent Wenck | 847 | 7.7 | +7.7 |
| Social Credit | Douglas Devenish | 491 | 4.5 | +4.5 |
| Total formal votes | | 10,925 | 99.1 | −0.2 |
| Informal votes | | 103 | 0.9 | +0.2 |
| Turnout | | 11,028 | 95.4 | −1.1 |
Two-party-preferred result
| Labor | Horace Davies | 7,161 | 65.5 | −0.8 |
| Country | Robert Hunter | 3,764 | 34.5 | +0.8 |
| Labor hold | | Swing | −0.8 | |

1960 Queensland state election: Maryborough
| Party | Candidate | Votes | % | ±% |
|---|---|---|---|---|
| Labor | Horace Davies | 7,197 | 66.3 | |
| Country | Ronald Christensen | 3,665 | 33.7 | |
| Total formal votes | | 10,862 | 99.3 | |
| Informal votes | | 80 | 0.7 | |
| Turnout | | 10,942 | 96.5 | |
| Labor hold | | Swing | | |

=== Elections in the 1950s ===
1957 Queensland state election: Maryborough
| Party | Candidate | Votes | % | ±% |
|---|---|---|---|---|
| Labor | Horace Davies | 5,297 | 53.1 | −13.1 |
| Country | James Dunn | 3,218 | 32.3 | −1.5 |
| Queensland Labor | Clement Gott | 1,461 | 14.6 | +14.6 |
| Total formal votes | | 9,976 | 98.6 | +0.1 |
| Informal votes | | 142 | 1.4 | −0.1 |
| Turnout | | 10,118 | 96.6 | +0.5 |
| Labor hold | | Swing | −4.0 | |

1956 Queensland state election: Maryborough
| Party | Candidate | Votes | % | ±% |
|---|---|---|---|---|
| Labor | Horace Davies | 6,488 | 66.2 | +10.2 |
| Country | James Dunn | 3,306 | 33.8 | +33.8 |
| Total formal votes | | 9,794 | 98.5 | +0.7 |
| Informal votes | | 152 | 1.5 | −0.7 |
| Turnout | | 9,946 | 96.1 | −1.4 |
| Labor hold | | Swing | N/A | |

1953 Queensland state election: Maryborough
| Party | Candidate | Votes | % | ±% |
|---|---|---|---|---|
| Labor | David Farrell | 5,429 | 56.0 | −9.5 |
| Independent | Cyril Tanner | 4,178 | 43.1 | +43.1 |
| Communist | Charles Reed | 92 | 0.9 | +0.9 |
| Total formal votes | | 9,699 | 97.8 | −0.2 |
| Informal votes | | 214 | 2.2 | +0.2 |
| Turnout | | 9,913 | 97.5 | +0.9 |
| Labor hold | | Swing | N/A | |

1950 Queensland state election: Maryborough
| Party | Candidate | Votes | % | ±% |
|---|---|---|---|---|
| Labor | David Farrell | 6,397 | 65.5 | |
| Liberal | Robert Hunter | 3,377 | 34.5 | |
| Total formal votes | | 9,774 | 98.0 | |
| Informal votes | | 203 | 2.0 | |
| Turnout | | 9,977 | 96.6 | |
| Labor hold | | Swing | | |

=== Elections in the 1940s ===
1947 Queensland state election: Maryborough
| Party | Candidate | Votes | % | ±% |
|---|---|---|---|---|
| Labor | David Farrell | 6,015 | 55.9 | −44.1 |
| People's Party | Frank Lawrence | 2,555 | 23.8 | +23.8 |
| Frank Barnes Labor | Mary De Mattos | 2,184 | 20.3 | +20.3 |
| Total formal votes | | 10,764 | 98.4 | |
| Informal votes | | 161 | 1.6 | |
| Turnout | | 10,925 | 91.2 | |
| Labor hold | | Swing | N/A | |

1944 Queensland state election: Maryborough
| Party | Candidate | Votes | % | ±% |
|---|---|---|---|---|
| Labor | David Farrell | unopposed | | |
| Labor hold | | Swing | | |

1941 Queensland state election: Maryborough
| Party | Candidate | Votes | % | ±% |
|---|---|---|---|---|
| Labor | David Farrell | 5,717 | 59.1 | −2.1 |
| Protestant Labour | Robert McDowell | 3,959 | 40.9 | +40.9 |
| Total formal votes | | 9,676 | 99.1 | −0.4 |
| Informal votes | | 91 | 0.9 | +0.4 |
| Turnout | | 9,767 | 92.9 | −1.8 |
| Labor hold | | Swing | N/A | |

=== Elections in the 1930s ===
1938 Queensland state election: Maryborough
| Party | Candidate | Votes | % | ±% |
|---|---|---|---|---|
| Labor | David Farrell | 5,645 | 61.2 | −29.2 |
| United Australia | Harold Reed | 2,751 | 29.8 | +29.8 |
| Social Credit | Noel Bromiley | 834 | 9.0 | +9.0 |
| Total formal votes | | 9,230 | 99.5 | +2.0 |
| Informal votes | | 50 | 0.5 | −2.0 |
| Turnout | | 9,280 | 94.7 | −0.6 |
| Labor hold | | Swing | N/A | |

- Preferences were not distributed.

1935 Queensland state election: Maryborough
| Party | Candidate | Votes | % | ±% |
|---|---|---|---|---|
| Labor | James Stopford | 7,644 | 90.4 | |
| Communist | Harold McElligott | 811 | 9.6 | |
| Total formal votes | | 8,455 | 97.5 | |
| Informal votes | | 219 | 2.5 | |
| Turnout | | 8,674 | 95.3 | |
| Labor hold | | Swing | | |

1932 Queensland state election: Maryborough
| Party | Candidate | Votes | % | ±% |
|---|---|---|---|---|
| Labor | James Stopford | 4,862 | 58.7 | |
| CPNP | Louis Luckins | 2,748 | 33.2 | |
| Independent | Alan Price | 425 | 5.1 | |
| Communist | Harold McElligott | 243 | 2.9 | |
| Total formal votes | | 8,278 | 97.2 | |
| Informal votes | | 235 | 2.8 | |
| Turnout | | 8,513 | 96.1 | |
| Labor hold | | Swing | | |

- Preferences were not distributed.

=== Elections in the 1920s ===
1929 Queensland state election: Maryborough
| Party | Candidate | Votes | % | ±% |
|---|---|---|---|---|
| Labor | David Weir | 3,179 | 52.0 | −7.3 |
| CPNP | John Blackley | 2,930 | 48.0 | +7.3 |
| Total formal votes | | 6,109 | 98.2 | −0.8 |
| Informal votes | | 110 | 1.8 | +0.8 |
| Turnout | | 6,219 | 94.0 | +0.4 |
| Labor hold | | Swing | −7.3 | |

1926 Queensland state election: Maryborough
| Party | Candidate | Votes | % | ±% |
|---|---|---|---|---|
| Labor | David Weir | 3,628 | 59.3 | −0.5 |
| CPNP | Harry Keys | 2,490 | 40.7 | +0.5 |
| Total formal votes | | 6,118 | 99.0 | −0.1 |
| Informal votes | | 62 | 1.0 | +0.1 |
| Turnout | | 6,180 | 93.6 | +6.0 |
| Labor hold | | Swing | −0.5 | |

1923 Queensland state election: Maryborough
| Party | Candidate | Votes | % | ±% |
|---|---|---|---|---|
| Labor | David Weir | 3,368 | 59.8 | +1.8 |
| United | John Hatton | 2,263 | 40.2 | −1.8 |
| Total formal votes | | 5,631 | 99.1 | −0.1 |
| Informal votes | | 50 | 0.9 | +0.1 |
| Turnout | | 5,681 | 87.6 | −1.3 |
| Labor hold | | Swing | +1.8 | |

1920 Queensland state election: Maryborough
| Party | Candidate | Votes | % | ±% |
|---|---|---|---|---|
| Labor | David Weir | 2,658 | 58.1 | −3.7 |
| National | James Hatton | 1,916 | 41.9 | +3.7 |
| Total formal votes | | 4,574 | 99.2 | 0.0 |
| Informal votes | | 36 | 0.8 | 0.0 |
| Turnout | | 4,610 | 88.9 | +1.3 |
| Labor hold | | Swing | −3.7 | |

=== Elections in the 1910s ===
1918 Queensland state election: Maryborough
| Party | Candidate | Votes | % | ±% |
|---|---|---|---|---|
| Labor | David Weir | 2,657 | 61.8 | +6.1 |
| National | Charles McGhie | 1,646 | 38.2 | −6.1 |
| Total formal votes | | 4,303 | 99.2 | +0.2 |
| Informal votes | | 33 | 0.8 | −0.2 |
| Turnout | | 4,336 | 87.6 | −4.7 |
| Labor hold | | Swing | +6.1 | |

1915 Queensland state election: Maryborough
| Party | Candidate | Votes | % | ±% |
|---|---|---|---|---|
| Labor | Alfred Jones | 2,398 | 55.7 | +5.8 |
| Liberal | Edward Corser | 1,904 | 44.3 | −5.8 |
| Total formal votes | | 4,302 | 99.0 | +0.4 |
| Informal votes | | 44 | 1.0 | −0.4 |
| Turnout | | 4,346 | 92.3 | +13.3 |
| Labor gain from Liberal | | Swing | +5.8 | |

1912 Queensland state election: Maryborough
| Party | Candidate | Votes | % | ±% |
|---|---|---|---|---|
| Liberal | Edward Corser | 1,750 | 50.1 | |
| Labor | William Mitchell | 1,740 | 49.9 | |
| Total formal votes | | 3,490 | 98.6 | |
| Informal votes | | 48 | 1.4 | |
| Turnout | | 3,538 | 79.0 | |
| Liberal hold | | Swing | | |
