= Electoral results for the district of Cooroora =

This is a list of electoral results for the electoral district of Cooroora in Queensland state elections.

== Members for Cooroora ==
Member	Party	Term
Harry Walker	Ministerialist	1912–1915
Harry Walker	Liberal	1915–1918
Harry Walker	National	1918–1920
Harry Walker	Country	1920–1925
Harry Walker	CPNP	1925–1936
Harry Walker	Country	1936–1947
David Low	Country	1947–1974
Gordon Simpson	National	1974–1989
Ray Barber	Labor	1989–1992

== Election results ==
=== Elections in the 1980s ===
The results for the 1989 election were:

1989 Queensland state election: Cooroora
Party	Candidate	Votes	%	±%
Labor	Ray Barber	11,857	48.1	+16.8
National	Robin Priebe	5,629	22.8	−26.6
Liberal	Allen Low	5,613	22.8	+8.2
Independent	Joseph Roach	1,561	6.3	+6.3
Total formal votes		24,660	97.2	−1.3
Informal votes		702	2.8	+1.3
Turnout		25,362	89.3	−0.0
Two-party-preferred result
Labor	Ray Barber	12,584	51.0	+12.2
Liberal	Allen Low	12,076	49.0	+49.0
Labor gain from National		Swing	+12.2	

1986 Queensland state election: Cooroora
Party	Candidate	Votes	%	±%
National	Gordon Simpson	9,163	49.4	−8.1
Labor	Brian Payler	5,799	31.3	−2.0
Liberal	Wehl Wansley	2,706	14.6	+14.6
Democrats	John Boultbee	871	4.7	−2.4
Total formal votes		18,539	98.5	
Informal votes		277	1.5	
Turnout		18,816	89.3	
Two-party-preferred result
National	Gordon Simpson	11,242	60.6	−1.0
Labor	Brian Payler	7,297	39.4	+1.0
National hold		Swing	−1.0	

1983 Queensland state election: Cooroora
Party	Candidate	Votes	%	±%
National	Gordon Simpson	13,478	57.5	+3.4
Labor	Gordon Nuttall	7,805	33.3	+6.2
Democrats	T. Roth	1,655	7.1	+7.1
Independent	Stanley Carlile	482	2.1	+2.1
Total formal votes		23,420	98.6	0.0
Informal votes		339	1.4	0.0
Turnout		23,759	90.7	+1.8
Two-party-preferred result
National	Gordon Simpson	14,547	62.1	−4.3
Labor	Gordon Nuttall	8,873	37.9	+4.3
National hold		Swing	−4.3	

1980 Queensland state election: Cooroora
Party	Candidate	Votes	%	±%
National	Gordon Simpson	10,457	54.2	+2.5
Labor	Sydney Appleby	5,230	27.1	−2.1
Liberal	John Barbeler	2,821	14.6	−4.4
Independent	Donald Sime	798	4.1	+4.1
Total formal votes		19,306	98.6	−0.5
Informal votes		280	1.4	+0.5
Turnout		19,586	88.9	−3.1
Two-party-preferred result
National	Gordon Simpson	12,821	66.4	−1.7
Labor	Sydney Appleby	6,485	33.6	+1.7
National hold		Swing	−1.7	

=== Elections in the 1970s ===
1977 Queensland state election: Cooroora
Party	Candidate	Votes	%	±%
National	Gordon Simpson	8,361	51.7	+4.1
Labor	Donald Sime	4,724	29.2	+9.4
Liberal	John Williams	3,078	19.0	−11.4
Total formal votes		16,163	99.1	
Informal votes		142	0.9	
Turnout		16,305	92.0	
Two-party-preferred result
National	Gordon Simpson	11,008	68.1	−6.8
Labor	Donald Sime	5,155	31.9	+6.8
National hold		Swing	−6.8	

1974 Queensland state election: Cooroora
Party	Candidate	Votes	%	±%
National	Gordon Simpson	6,812	47.6	−12.9
Liberal	Henry Williams	4,353	30.4	+30.4
Labor	Anthony Dames	2,835	19.8	−12.3
Queensland Labor	Alexander Browne	310	2.2	−5.3
Total formal votes		14,310	98.9	+0.2
Informal votes		163	1.1	−0.2
Turnout		14,473	89.1	−3.1
Two-party-preferred result
National	Gordon Simpson	10,714	74.9	+9.1
Labor	Anthony Dames	3,596	25.1	−9.1
Two-candidate-preferred result
National	Gordon Simpson	7,453	52.1	−13.7
Liberal	Henry Williams	6,857	47.9	+47.9
National hold		Swing	−13.7	

1972 Queensland state election: Cooroora
Party	Candidate	Votes	%	±%
Country	David Low	7,126	60.4	−1.7
Labor	Anthony Dames	3,785	32.1	+1.7
Queensland Labor	Alexander Browne	878	7.5	0.0
Total formal votes		11,789	98.7	
Informal votes		149	1.3	
Turnout		11,938	92.2	
Two-party-preferred result
Country	David Low	7,758	65.8	−1.7
Labor	Anthony Dames	4,031	34.2	+1.7
Country hold		Swing	−1.7	

=== Elections in the 1960s ===
1969 Queensland state election: Cooroora
Party	Candidate	Votes	%	±%
Country	David Low	6,116	62.1	+2.1
Labor	Lutgerdienko Hoiting	2,991	30.4	−9.6
Queensland Labor	Alexander Browne	744	7.5	+7.5
Total formal votes		9,851	98.4	−0.4
Informal votes		161	1.6	+0.4
Turnout		10,012	93.4	−0.3
Two-party-preferred result
Country	David Low	6,656	67.6	+7.6
Labor	Lutgerdienko Hoiting	3,195	32.4	−7.6
Country hold		Swing	+7.6	

1966 Queensland state election: Cooroora
Party	Candidate	Votes	%	±%
Country	David Low	5,716	60.0	−1.8
Labor	Kenneth Kliese	3,813	40.0	+8.8
Total formal votes		9,529	98.8	+0.2
Informal votes		111	1.2	−0.2
Turnout		9,640	93.7	−0.9
Country hold		Swing	−7.8	

1963 Queensland state election: Cooroora
Party	Candidate	Votes	%	±%
Country	David Low	5,746	61.8	−9.2
Labor	Lancelot Sanderson	2,900	31.2	+2.2
Independent	Theophilus Chapman	644	6.9	+6.9
Total formal votes		9,290	98.6	0.0
Informal votes		131	1.4	0.0
Turnout		9,421	94.6	+0.4
Two-party-preferred result
Country	David Low	6,297	67.8	−3.2
Labor	Lancelot Sanderson	2,993	32.2	+3.2
Country hold		Swing	−3.2	

1960 Queensland state election: Cooroora
Party	Candidate	Votes	%	±%
Country	David Low	6,281	71.0	
Labor	Lancelot Sanderson	2,560	29.0	
Total formal votes		8,841	98.6	
Informal votes		124	1.4	
Turnout		8,965	94.2	
Country hold		Swing		

=== Elections in the 1950s ===
1957 Queensland state election: Cooroora
Party	Candidate	Votes	%	±%
Country	David Low	7,201	75.9	+7.7
Labor	Ralph Smith	2,283	24.1	−7.7
Total formal votes		9,484	98.4	−0.8
Informal votes		156	1.6	+0.8
Turnout		9,640	95.0	+0.9
Country hold		Swing	+7.7	

1956 Queensland state election: Cooroora
Party	Candidate	Votes	%	±%
Country	David Low	6,396	68.2	−1.9
Labor	Geoffrey Arnell	2,978	31.8	+1.9
Total formal votes		9,374	99.2	−0.1
Informal votes		72	0.8	+0.1
Turnout		9,446	94.1	−0.5
Country hold		Swing	−1.9	

1953 Queensland state election: Cooroora
Party	Candidate	Votes	%	±%
Country	David Low	6,359	70.1	−2.5
Labor	Geoffrey Arnell	2,713	29.9	+2.5
Total formal votes		9,072	99.3	+0.1
Informal votes		67	0.7	−0.1
Turnout		9,139	94.6	+2.4
Country hold		Swing	−2.5	

1950 Queensland state election: Cooroora
Party	Candidate	Votes	%	±%
Country	David Low	6,390	72.6	
Labor	Geoffrey Arnell	2,411	27.4	
Total formal votes		8,801	99.2	
Informal votes		73	0.8	
Turnout		8,874	92.2	
Country hold		Swing		

=== Elections in the 1940s ===
1947 Queensland state election: Cooroora
Party	Candidate	Votes	%	±%
Country	David Low	3,069	31.4	−31.1
Frank Barnes Labor	Bill Gresham	2,693	27.6	+27.6
Labor	Robert Spencer	2,217	22.7	−14.8
Independent Country	William Low	1,791	18.3	+18.3
Total formal votes		9,770	98.6	−0.5
Informal votes		142	1.4	+0.5
Turnout		9,912	92.3	+3.3
Country hold		Swing	N/A	

1944 Queensland state election: Cooroora
Party	Candidate	Votes	%	±%
Country	Harry Walker	5,486	62.5	−37.5
Labor	Robert Spencer	3,289	37.5	+37.5
Total formal votes		8,775	99.1	
Informal votes		79	0.9	
Turnout		8,854	89.0	
Country hold		Swing	N/A	

1941 Queensland state election: Cooroora
Party	Candidate	Votes	%	±%
Country	Harry Walker	unopposed		
Country hold		Swing		

=== Elections in the 1930s ===
1938 Queensland state election: Cooroora
Party	Candidate	Votes	%	±%
Country	Harry Walker	5,353	59.5	−7.1
Labor	Andrew Thompson	2,283	25.4	+25.4
Social Credit	Denis Hannay	1,364	15.1	+15.1
Total formal votes		9,000	98.9	+0.8
Informal votes		100	1.1	−0.8
Turnout		9,100	94.4	+0.7
Country hold		Swing	N/A	

- Preferences were not distributed.

1935 Queensland state election: Cooroora
Party	Candidate	Votes	%	±%
CPNP	Harry Walker	5,700	66.6	
Women's Political Alliance	Nora Solly	2,898	33.4	
Total formal votes		8,688	98.1	
Informal votes		165	1.9	
Turnout		8,853	93.7	
CPNP hold		Swing		

1932 Queensland state election: Cooroora
Party	Candidate	Votes	%	±%
CPNP	Harry Walker	4,516	68.4	
Labor	Roy Reid	2,087	31.6	
Total formal votes		6,603	99.3	
Informal votes		49	0.7	
Turnout		6,652	88.0	
CPNP hold		Swing		

=== Elections in the 1920s ===
1929 Queensland state election: Cooroora
Party	Candidate	Votes	%	±%
CPNP	Harry Walker	unopposed		
CPNP hold		Swing		

1926 Queensland state election: Cooroora
Party	Candidate	Votes	%	±%
CPNP	Harry Walker	unopposed		
CPNP hold		Swing		

1923 Queensland state election: Cooroora
Party	Candidate	Votes	%	±%
Country	Harry Walker	unopposed		
Country hold		Swing		

1920 Queensland state election: Cooroora
Party	Candidate	Votes	%	±%
Country	Harry Walker	unopposed		
Country gain from National		Swing		

=== Elections in the 1910s ===
1918 Queensland state election: Cooroora
Party	Candidate	Votes	%	±%
National	Harry Walker	3,213	64.5	+3.9
Labor	Hector Spratt	1,766	35.5	−3.9
Total formal votes		4,979	98.9	+0.3
Informal votes		53	1.1	−0.3
Turnout		5,032	80.9	−6.6
National hold		Swing	+3.9	

1915 Queensland state election: Cooroora
Party	Candidate	Votes	%	±%
Liberal	Harry Walker	2,559	60.6	−3.9
Labor	Daniel O'Brien	1,664	39.4	+3.9
Total formal votes		4,223	98.6	−0.5
Informal votes		58	1.4	+0.5
Turnout		4,281	87.5	+12.5
Liberal hold		Swing	−3.9	

1912 Queensland state election: Cooroora
Party	Candidate	Votes	%	±%
Liberal	Harry Walker	2,206	64.5	
Labor	William Jones	1,216	35.5	
Total formal votes		3,422	99.1	
Informal votes		31	0.9	
Turnout		3,453	75.0	
Liberal hold		Swing		
