= Members of the Queensland Legislative Assembly, 2001–2004 =

This is a list of members of the 50th Legislative Assembly of Queensland from 2001 to 2004, as elected at the 2001 state election held on 17 February 2001.

Name	Party	District	Term in office
Julie Attwood	Labor	Mount Ommaney	1998–2012
Bonny Barry	Labor	Aspley	2001–2009
Hon Tom Barton	Labor	Waterford	1992–2006
Hon Peter Beattie	Labor	Brisbane Central	1989–2007
Lex Bell ^{[1]}	Independent	Surfers Paradise	2001–2004
Hon Anna Bligh	Labor	South Brisbane	1995–2012
Hon Rob Borbidge ^{[1]}	National	Surfers Paradise	1980–2001
Desley Boyle	Labor	Cairns	1998–2012
Hon Steve Bredhauer	Labor	Cook	1989–2004
Darryl Briskey	Labor	Cleveland	1989–2006
Michael Choi	Labor	Capalaba	2001–2012
Liddy Clark	Labor	Clayfield	2001–2006
Dr Lesley Clark	Labor	Barron River	1989–1995, 1998–2006
Stuart Copeland	National	Cunningham	2001–2009
Peta-Kaye Croft	Labor	Broadwater	2001–2012
Chris Cummins	Labor	Kawana	2001–2006
Liz Cunningham	Independent	Gladstone	1995–2015
Hon Nita Cunningham	Labor	Bundaberg	1998–2006
Hon Wendy Edmond	Labor	Mount Coot-tha	1989–2004
John English	Labor	Redlands	2001–2009
Gary Fenlon	Labor	Greenslopes	1989–1995, 1998–2009
Bill Flynn	One Nation	Lockyer	2001–2004
Chris Foley ^{[4]}	Independent	Maryborough	2003–2012
Hon Matt Foley	Labor	Yeerongpilly	1989–2004
Hon Jim Fouras	Labor	Ashgrove	1977–1986, 1989–2006
Hon Ken Hayward	Labor	Kallangur	1986–2009
Howard Hobbs	National	Warrego	1986–2015
Hon Ray Hollis	Labor	Redcliffe	1989–2005
Ray Hopper	Independent/National ^{[2]}	Darling Downs	2001–2015
Mike Horan	National	Toowoomba South	1991–2012
Jan Jarratt	Labor	Whitsunday	2001–2012
Vaughan Johnson	National	Gregory	2001–2015
Margaret Keech	Labor	Albert	2001–2012
Dr John Kingston ^{[4]}	Independent	Maryborough	1998–2003
Linda Lavarch	Labor	Kurwongbah	1997–2009
Peter Lawlor	Labor	Southport	2001–2012
Ronan Lee	Labor	Indooroopilly	2001–2009
Hon Vince Lester	National	Keppel	1974–2004
Rosa Lee Long	One Nation	Tablelands	2001–2009
Hon Kev Lingard	National	Beaudesert	1983–2009
Don Livingstone	Labor	Ipswich West	1989–1998, 2001–2006
Hon Paul Lucas	Labor	Lytton	1996–2012
Hon Terry Mackenroth	Labor	Chatsworth	1977–2005
Carolyn Male	Labor	Glass House	2001–2012
Ted Malone	National	Mirani	1994–2015
Hon Tony McGrady	Labor	Mount Isa	1989–2006
Andrew McNamara	Labor	Hervey Bay	2001–2009
John Mickel	Labor	Logan	1998–2012
Jo-Ann Miller	Labor	Bundamba	2000–2020
Cate Molloy	Labor	Noosa	2001–2006
Tim Mulherin	Labor	Mackay	1995–2015
Lindy Nelson-Carr	Labor	Mundingburra	1998–2012
Rachel Nolan	Labor	Ipswich	2001–2012
Hon Gordon Nuttall	Labor	Sandgate	1992–2006
Hon Henry Palaszczuk	Labor	Inala	1984–2006
Jim Pearce	Labor	Fitzroy	1989–2009, 2015–2017
Anita Phillips	Labor	Thuringowa	2001–2004
Hon Warren Pitt	Labor	Mulgrave	1989–1995, 1998–2009
Robert Poole	Labor	Gaven	2001–2006
Dorothy Pratt	Independent	Nanango	1998–2012
Pat Purcell	Labor	Bulimba	1992–2009
Bob Quinn	Liberal	Robina	1989–2006
Phil Reeves	Labor	Mansfield	1998–2012
Dianne Reilly	Labor	Mudgeeraba	2001–2009
Hon Mike Reynolds	Labor	Townsville	1998–2009
Elisa Roberts	One Nation/Independent ^{[3]}	Gympie	2001–2006
Neil Roberts	Labor	Nudgee	1995–2012
Hon Stephen Robertson	Labor	Stretton	1992–2012
Steve Rodgers	Labor	Burdekin	2001–2004
Hon Merri Rose	Labor	Currumbin	1992–2004
Marc Rowell	National	Hinchinbrook	1989–2006
Hon Robert Schwarten	Labor	Rockhampton	1989–1992, 1995–2012
Christine Scott	Labor	Charters Towers	2001–2004
Desley Scott	Labor	Woodridge	2001–2015
Jeff Seeney	National	Callide	1998–2017
Joan Sheldon	Liberal	Caloundra	1990–2004
Kerry Shine	Labor	Toowoomba North	2001–2012
Fiona Simpson	National	Maroochydore	1992–present
Christine Smith	Labor	Burleigh	2001–2012
Hon Judy Spence	Labor	Mount Gravatt	1989–2012
Lawrence Springborg	National	Southern Downs	1989–2017
Barbara Stone	Labor	Springwood	2001–2012
Trevor Strong	Labor	Burnett	2001–2004
Karen Struthers	Labor	Algester	1998–2012
Carryn Sullivan	Labor	Pumicestone	2001–2012
Terry Sullivan	Labor	Stafford	1991–2006
Dr David Watson	Liberal	Moggill	1989–2004
Hon Rod Welford	Labor	Everton	1989–2009
Peter Wellington	Independent	Nicklin	1998–2017
Hon Dean Wells	Labor	Murrumba	1986–2012
Geoff Wilson	Labor	Ferny Grove	1998–2012

^{1} On 20 March 2001, the National member for Surfers Paradise and Opposition Leader, Rob Borbidge, resigned. Independent candidate Lex Bell won the resulting by-election on 5 May 2001.
^{2} The member for Darling Downs, Ray Hopper, was elected as an independent, but joined the National Party on 21 December 2001.
^{3} The member for Gympie, Elisa Roberts, was elected as a One Nation member, but resigned from the party on 18 April 2002, and served out the remainder of her term as an independent.
^{4} On 24 March 2003, the Independent member for Maryborough, John Kingston, resigned. Independent candidate Chris Foley won the resulting by-election on 26 April 2003.

== See also ==
- 2001 Queensland state election
- Beattie Ministry (Labor) (1998–2007)
