= Speaker of the Legislative Assembly of Queensland =

Australian state legislative officer

- Incumbent; Pat Weir since 26 November 2024
- Style: The Honourable
- Appointer: Elected by the Queensland Legislative Assembly
- Formation: 22 May 1860
- First holder: Gilbert Eliott
- Deputy: Jon Krause
- Salary: AUD $287,035 (2015)

The speaker of the Legislative Assembly of Queensland is elected by the members of the Queensland Legislative Assembly to preside over sittings of the Assembly and to maintain orderly proceedings. The Speaker must be a member of the Legislative Assembly. The position is currently held by Pat Weir, who was elected to the post on 26 November 2024.

== Election ==
The Legislative Assembly must choose a new Speaker when it meets following a general election. The member with the longest period of continuous service presides during the election, which is conducted by secret ballot. The Government party nominates one of its own to serve as Speaker, and that nominee is likely to win since the party typically has a majority of the seats. If the office of Speaker falls vacant, for whatever reason, the Assembly must immediately elect a replacement. The Speaker remains in office "for all purposes" following a dissolution of Parliament until the day before the first day of the new Parliament, even if the Speaker was not a candidate for re-election or lost re-election.

== Role ==
As the chief presiding officer of the Legislative Assembly, the Speaker is expected to be impartial in chairing debates and ensuring orderly conduct in the Chamber. When in the chair, the Speaker may only vote in the case of a tie, i.e. a casting vote. Unlike Speakers in many other Westminster system parliaments, when the Deputy Speaker or another member is in the chair, the Speaker may participate in debates and cast a deliberative vote. This is especially important in hung parliaments.

The Speaker is responsible for issuing writs for state by-elections, warrants for parliamentary privilege offenders and bringing before the bar of the Parliament such offenders for rebuke or sentence. Among the office's ceremonial duties are representing the Legislative Assembly to the Crown (as by, for instance, presenting the Address in Reply to the Throne Speech) and to entities outside Parliament.

Administratively, the Speaker has control of the Parliamentary Service and is responsible for the Parliament's budget, services, and administration.

== Deputies ==
"As soon as practicable" after first meeting, the House must choose a member to serve as Deputy Speaker and Chairperson of Committees; in recent practice, the Premier moves the appointment of the Deputy Speaker without debate or opposition as the first matter of business on the second day of the Parliament. As with the Speaker, the House must immediately fill a vacancy in the office. Like the Speaker, the Deputy Speaker remains in office after a dissolution of Parliament until the day before the next Parliament convenes even if the deputy speaker loses re-election or did not run for reelection.

The role of Deputy Speaker is created by the Standing Orders of the Legislative Assembly, and that of Chairperson of Committees by section 17(1) of the Parliament of Queensland Act 2001. As Deputy Speaker, the member takes the chair when the Speaker is absent or at his or her request. When the House resolves into a Committee of the Whole, the Chairperson must take the chair. The current Deputy Speaker is Jon Krause.

The Speaker also appoints up to eight Temporary Speakers who take the chair in the absence or at the request of the Speaker or Deputy Speaker. The Speaker may also dismiss members of the panel of Temporary Speakers. When in the chair, Temporary Speakers are referred to as “Deputy Speaker”.

When the Speaker is absent for a sitting day, the Deputy Speaker acts as Speaker and chooses a Temporary Speaker to act as Deputy Speaker during the Speaker's absence. If the Speaker and Deputy Speaker are both absent, the House must choose a member to act as Speaker for that day. This occurred most recently during 2020 when Speaker Pitt and Deputy Speaker Stewart (both regional MPs unable to travel due to COVID-19 restrictions) were absent and Temporary Speaker Joe Kelly was chosen by the House to act in their stead.

== List of Speakers ==
Member	Electorate	Party	Start of term	End of term	Notes
Gilbert Eliott	Wide Bay		22 May 1860	13 July 1870	
Arthur Macalister	Eastern Downs		15 November 1870	21 June 1871	Premier of Queensland (1866; 1866–1867; 1874–1876)
Frederick Forbes	West Moreton		7 November 1871	1 September 1873	
William Henry Walsh	Warrego		6 January 1874	20 July 1876	
Henry Edward King	Ravenswood/Maryborough		25 July 1876	26 July 1883	
William Henry Groom	Drayton and Toowoomba	Protectionist	7 November 1883	4 April 1888	
Albert Norton	Port Curtis	Conservative/Ministerialist	12 June 1888	5 April 1893	
Alfred Cowley	Herbert	Ministerialist	25 May 1893	15 February 1899	
Arthur Morgan	Warwick	Ministerialist	16 May 1899	15 September 1903	Premier of Queensland (1903–1906); President of the Queensland Legislative Council
Alfred Cowley	Herbert	Conservative	17 September 1903	11 April 1907	
John Leahy	Bulloo	Conservative	23 July 1907	20 January 1909	
Joshua Thomas Bell	Dalby	Kidston/Ministerialist	29 June 1909	10 March 1911	Died in office
William Drayton Armstrong	Lockyer	Ministerialist/Liberal	11 July 1911	15 April 1915	
William McCormack	Cairns	Labor	12 July 1915	9 September 1919	Premier (1925–1929)
William Lennon	Herbert	Labor	9 September 1919	9 January 1920	Became Lieutenant-Governor of Queensland; President of the Queensland Legislative Council
William Bertram	Maree	Labor	9 January 1920	11 May 1929	
Charles Taylor	Windsor	CPNP	20 August 1929	11 June 1932	
George Pollock	Gregory	Labor	15 August 1932	24 March 1939	Died in office
Edward Joseph Hanson	Buranda	Labor	8 August 1939	31 July 1944	
Samuel Brassington	Fortitude Valley	Labor	1 August 1944	4 October 1950	Died in office
Johnno Mann	Brisbane	Labor	10 October 1950	3 July 1957	
Alan Fletcher	Cunningham	Country	27 August 1957	15 June 1960	
David Nicholson	Murrumba	Country	23 August 1960	25 May 1972	Longest-serving Speaker
Bill Longeran	Flinders	Country/National	2 August 1972	28 October 1974	
Jim Houghton	Redcliffe	National	29 October 1974	4 July 1979	
Selwyn Muller	Fassifern	National	8 August 1979	17 October 1983	
John Warner	Toowoomba South	National	22 November 1983	1 November 1986	
Kev Lingard	Fassifern	National	17 February 1987	24 November 1987	
Lin Powell	Isis	National/Independent (after 3 May 1989)	2 December 1987	5 July 1989	
Kev Lingard	Fassifern	National	5 July 1989	2 November 1989	
Jim Fouras	Ashgrove	Labor	27 February 1990	2 April 1996	
Neil Turner	Nicklin	National	2 April 1996	13 June 1998	
Ray Hollis	Redcliffe	Labor	28 July 1998	21 July 2005	
Tony McGrady	Mount Isa	Labor	9 August 2005	9 October 2006	
Mike Reynolds	Townsville	Labor	10 October 2006	21 April 2009	
John Mickel	Logan	Labor	21 April 2009	14 May 2012	
Fiona Simpson	Maroochydore	Liberal National	15 May 2012	24 March 2015	First female Speaker
Peter Wellington	Nicklin	Independent	24 March 2015	25 November 2017	First Independent Speaker since 1883
Curtis Pitt	Mulgrave	Labor	13 February 2018	26 November 2024	Treasurer of Queensland (2015–2017)
Joe Kelly	Greenslopes	Labor	16 May 2023	12 September 2023	Acting Speaker
Pat Weir	Condamine	Liberal National	26 November 2024		

== Sources ==
- "Factsheet 3.13: The Office of the Speaker" (PDF). Everyone's Parliament. Parliament of Queensland.
- "Standing Rules and Orders of the Legislative Assembly" (PDF). Legislative Assembly of Queensland. Last updated 15 November 2011.
- Parliament of Queensland Act 2001.
