= Mathew Mellor =

Australian politician

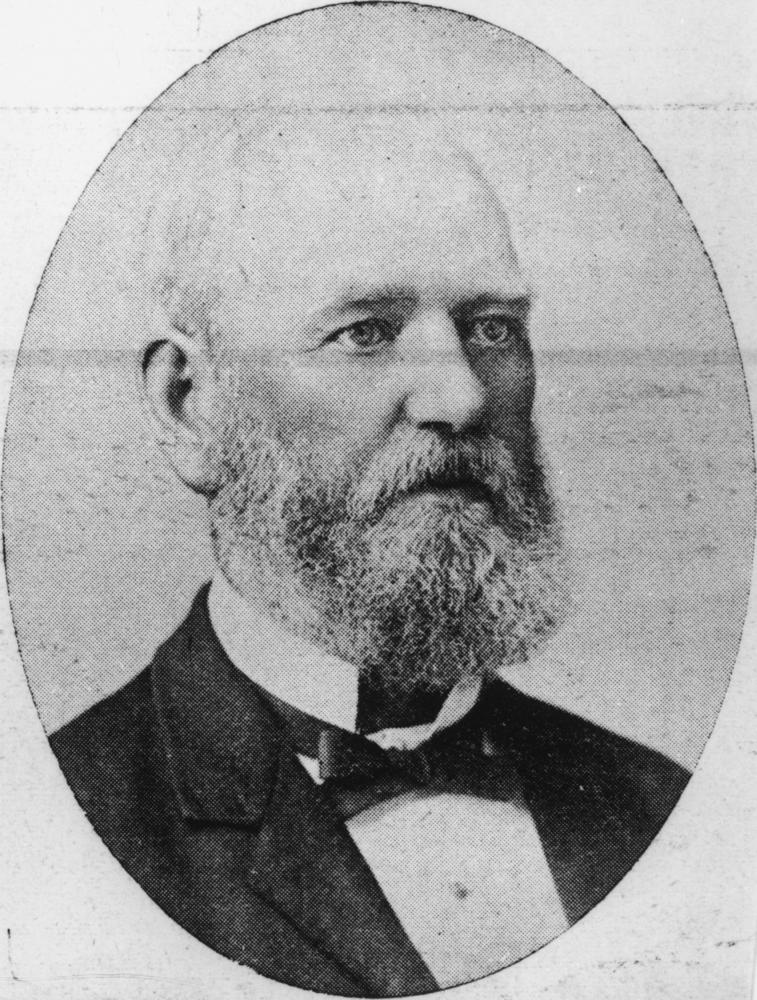
- Mathew Mellor in 1897.

Member of the Queensland Legislative Assembly for Wide Bay
- In office 7 September 1883 – 5 May 1888 Serving with William Bailey
- Preceded by: Thomas Price
- Succeeded by: Horace Tozer

Member of the Queensland Legislative Assembly for Gympie
- In office 5 May 1888 – 29 April 1893 Serving with William Smyth
- Preceded by: New seat
- Succeeded by: Andrew Fisher

Personal details
- Born: Mathew Mellor; 1839 Leek, Staffordshire, England
- Died: 17 February 1899 (aged 59–60) Brisbane, Queensland, Australia
- Resting place: Gympie Cemetery
- Spouse(s): Martha Pache, Mary Ann Bouchard (m.1880)
- Occupation: Farmer, Timber cutter, Butcher

Mathew Mellor (1839 – 17 February 1899) was a politician in Queensland, Australia. He was mayor of Gympie and a Member of the Queensland Legislative Assembly.

== Politics ==
Mellor was the first mayor of the Borough of Gympie (later City of Gympie). He served first from 1880 to 1881 and then again in 1897.

Mellor also served two terms as a Member of the Queensland Legislative Assembly, holding the seat of Wide Bay from 1883 to 1888 and Gympie from 1888 to 1893.

== Personal life ==
Mellor married Martha Pache and they had two sons. He then married Mary Ann Bouchard on 24 February 1880. Together three sons and four daughters.

Dying in 1899, Mellor was buried in the Gympie Cemetery.

Parliament of Queensland
Preceded by Thomas Price	Member for Wide Bay; 1883–1888; Served alongside: William Bailey	Succeeded by Horace Tozer
New seat	Member for Gympie; 1888–1893; Served alongside: William Smyth	Succeeded by Andrew Fisher
