= Thomas Price (Queensland politician) =

Australian politician

Member of the Queensland Legislative Assembly for Wide Bay
- In office 23 Nov 1878 – 7 Sep 1883 Serving with William Bailey
- Preceded by: Henry King
- Succeeded by: Matthew Mellor

Personal details
- Born: Thomas Price; 1840 Ilfracombe, Devonshire, England
- Died: 4 April 1906 (aged 65 or 66) Albion, Queensland, Australia
- Spouse: Elizabeth Grice (m.1870 d.1933)
- Occupation: Builder

Thomas Price (1840–1906) was a politician in Queensland, Australia. He was a Member of the Queensland Legislative Assembly. Price was the member for the Electoral District of Wide Bay from November 1878 to September 1883.

== Personal life ==
He was born in 1840 in Ilfracombe, Devonshire, England to Thomas Price and Elizabeth (née Banter). He died on 4 April 1906 in Albion, Brisbane, Queensland. He married Elizabeth Grice (died 1933) on 27 December 1870, and had 4 sons and 3 daughters.

Price was a builder and contractor who acquired a Tiaro grazing property in 1890.

According to an article in the Melbourne Age he was fined 40 shillings for drunkenness and disturbing the services of the salvation army.

Parliament of Queensland
Preceded by Henry King	Member for Wide Bay; 1878–1883; Served alongside: William Bailey	Succeeded by Matthew Mellor
