= Bruce Saunders =

Australian politician

Bruce Saunders MP

Member of the Queensland Legislative Assembly for Maryborough
- In office 31 January 2015 – 26 October 2024
- Preceded by: Anne Maddern
- Succeeded by: John Barounis

Personal details
- Born: Longreach, Queensland
- Party: Labor
- Occupation: Small business owner

Bruce Mark Saunders is an Australian former politician who served as the Labor member for Maryborough in the Queensland Legislative Assembly from 2015 until his defeat at the 2024 state election.

== Early life ==
Saunders was born and raised in Longreach, Queensland. He previously worked as a radio announcer in Maryborough prior to opening Scoops on Bazaar, a gelato shop, in December 2013. He owned and operated the store until his election in 2015.

== Political career ==
At the 1995 Queensland state election, Saunders was preselected as the Labor candidate for the seat of Keppel, however incumbent National member Vince Lester was easily re-elected with an 8.9 percent swing in his favour amidst an anti-Labor swing across regional Queensland. He recontested Keppel in 1998 but again fell short of victory, although he achieved a 6.7 percent swing, enough to make the seat marginal.

20 years later, Saunders was chosen as the Labor candidate for Maryborough at the 2015 Queensland state election. Incumbent MP Anne Maddern had been elected during the landslide Liberal National victory of 2012, narrowly defeating then-incumbent Independent member Chris Foley. Although both Maddern and Foley recontested in 2015, Saunders came second on primaries and polled 25.3 percent of the vote, ultimately prevailing over Maddern by a slim margin of 1.6 percent after preferences were distributed.

A resurgent One Nation threatened his hold on the seat in 2017, but he was re-elected with a 20 percent swing on first-preference votes, translating to a slightly improved 2.5 percent margin once preferences were distributed.

Saunders easily won re-election at the 2020 state election amidst the first year of the COVID-19 pandemic, winning 53 percent of the first-preference vote and a TPP of 11.9 percent, enough to make Maryborough a safe Labor seat. Following the election he was made Assistant Minister for Train Manufacturing in the Third Palaszczuk ministry. Following Palaszczuk's resignation in December 2023, he was also made Assistant Minister for Regional Development and Jobs as part of the Miles ministry.

On 18 February 2024, the Courier Mail reported that Saunders had been in talks to defect to Katter's Australian Party, apparently being unsatisfied with the Labor government's handling of youth crime, although he denied the reports the following day.

Despite holding Maryborough by a safe margin of almost 12 percent, Saunders was defeated at the 2024 Queensland state election by Liberal National candidate John Barounis amidst a massive anti-Labor swing which saw them all but wiped out in regional Queensland.

Parliament of Queensland
Preceded by Anne Maddern	Member for Maryborough; 2015–2024	Succeeded by John Barounis
