= 2003 Maryborough state by-election =

A by-election was held in the Legislative Assembly of Queensland seat of Maryborough on 26 April 2003. It was triggered by the resignation of sitting member John Kingston.

The by-election resulted in the baton passing from one independent to another when Chris Foley was elected as the new member.

== Background ==
John Kingston was first elected to state parliament as one of 11 One Nation candidates ushered in at the 1998 state election. All eleven members would eventually break with their party, with Kingston doing so in early 1999 to sit as an independent. He was re-elected in that capacity at the 2001 state election before resigning in 2003 due to ill health.

== Candidates ==
Kingston's retirement presented the Labor Party with an opportunity to win back the seat they had held prior to his 1998 victory. Labor preselected postal worker Doug Loggie.

The contest for National Party preselection—which had last held the seat from 1983 to 1989—saw Peter Andrews win endorsement over four other candidates. Ominously, one of those candidates, church pastor and financial advisor Chris Foley, chose to stand for the by-election in an independent capacity.

== Result ==
Chris Foley easily outpolled the candidate of his former party and, with the help of preferences, won the seat over Labor candidate Doug Loggie.

Maryborough state by-election, 2003
Party	Candidate	Votes	%	±%
Labor	Doug Loggie	8,465	37.02	−4.99
Independent	Chris Foley	7,619	33.32	+33.32
National	Peter Andrews	3,925	17.16	+2.61
One Nation	Brad Marsh	1,679	7.34	+7.34
Greens	Dean Pratley	775	3.39	+3.39
Independent	Ray Smith	179	0.78	−1.49
Independent	John Ahearn	174	0.76	+0.76
Independent	Jeremy Roberts	51	0.22	+0.22
Total formal votes		22,867	97.91	+0.28
Informal votes		488	2.09	−0.28
Turnout		23,355	88.08	−7.06
Two-candidate-preferred result
Independent	Chris Foley	10,484	53.51	+53.51
Labor	Doug Loggie	9,109	46.49	−3.01
Independent hold		Swing	N/A	

== See also ==
- List of Queensland state by-elections
