= Charles Moffatt Jenkinson =

Australian politician

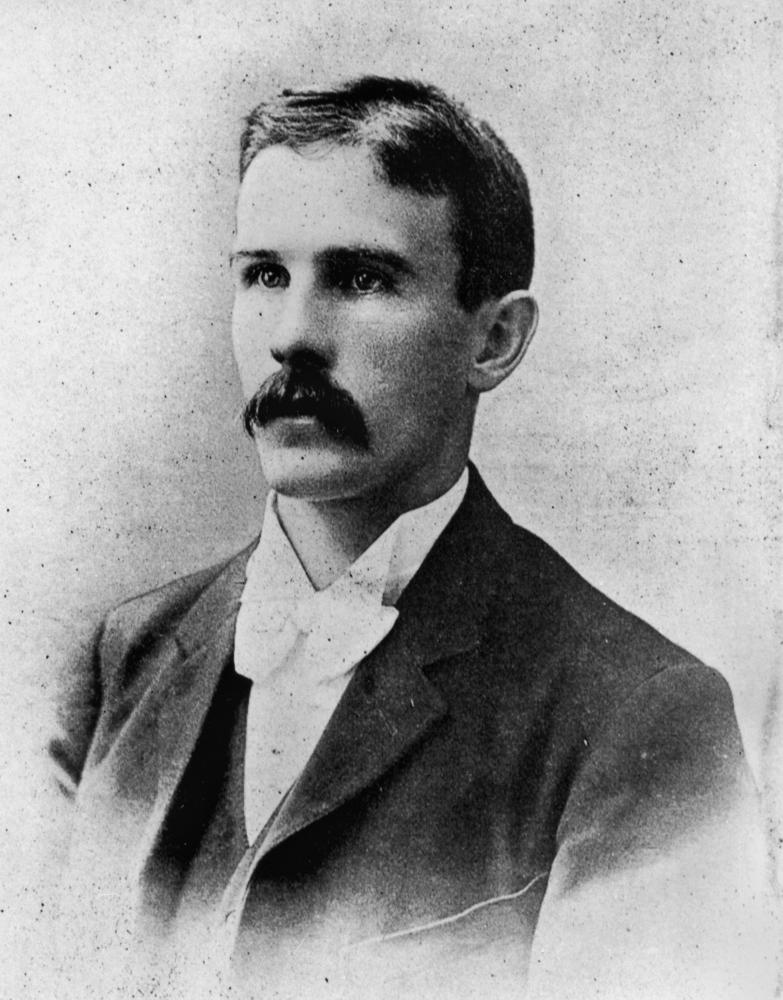
- Charles Jenkinson, ca. 1900.

41st Mayor of Brisbane
- In office 1914–1914
- Preceded by: Harry Doggett
- Succeeded by: George Down

Member of the Queensland Legislative Assembly for Wide Bay
- In office 19 March 1898 – 11 March 1902
- Preceded by: Horace Tozer
- Succeeded by: George Lindley

Member of the Queensland Legislative Assembly for Fassifern
- In office 13 January 1903 – 2 October 1909
- Preceded by: Thomas Murray-Prior
- Succeeded by: Arnold Wienholt

Personal details
- Born: 28 March 1865 Birmingham, England
- Died: 3 July 1954 (aged 89) Brisbane, Queensland
- Resting place: Lutwyche Cemetery
- Spouse: Georgina Agnes Ferguson (m.1893 d.1943)
- Occupation: Bootmaker, Draper

Charles Moffatt Jenkinson (1865–1954) was a Queensland politician.

== Early life ==
Charles Moffatt Jenkinson was born on 28 March 1865 in Birmingham, England.

He immigrated to Queensland in 1883, where he worked mostly as a journalist. He was publisher of the Herald, a Brisbane sporting newspaper.

== Political life ==
He served as a Member of the Queensland Legislative Assembly for Wide Bay from 19 March 1898 (a by-election) to 11 March 1902, and as the member for Fassifern from 13 January 1903 (another by-election) to 2 October 1909.

He served as an alderman on the Brisbane City Council from 1912 to 1916 and from 1920 to 1921, and was the mayor of Brisbane in 1914. As mayor, he is credited with having finalised the decision to construct the (then) new Brisbane City Hall at Albert Square (now known as King George Square), by selling the alternative site in Fortitude Valley to the Catholic Church who proposed to construct the Holy Name Cathedral on that site.

Jenkinson was a candidate for the state seat of Brisbane in the 1915 election but was defeated by the sitting Labor member Mick Kirwan.

Jenkinson was a candidate for the state seat of Toombul in the 1923 election but was defeated by the long-serving sitting member Andrew Petrie. When Andrew Petie retired at the 1926 election, Jenkinson again was a candidate for Toombul but was defeated by Hugh Russell. Undeterred, Jenkinson was a candidate for Toombul in the 1929 election but was again defeated by Hugh Russell.

== Later life ==
Jenkinson died in Brisbane on 3 July 1954 aged 90. He had been bedridden for 5 years prior to his death. He was buried in Lutwyche Cemetery.

== See also ==
- Members of the Queensland Legislative Assembly

Parliament of Queensland
Preceded by Horace Tozer	Member for Wide Bay; 1898–1902	Succeeded by George Lindley
Preceded by Thomas Murray-Prior	Member for Fassifern; 1903–1909	Succeeded by Arnold Wienholt
