= Electoral district of Leichhardt, Queensland (New South Wales) =

Former state electoral district of New South Wales, Australia in the Queensland area

Leichhardt New South Wales—Legislative Assembly
- State: New South Wales
- Created: July 1859
- Abolished: December 1859

Leichhardt was an electoral district, located in the colony of New South Wales, Australia, and part of the New South Wales Legislative Assembly. The district was created for the July 1859 election, partly replacing the United Pastoral Districts of Moreton, Wide Bay, Burnett, Maranoa, Leichhardt and Port Curtis in the present day central Queensland. It included the towns of Rockhampton and Emerald, the pastoral districts around the Leichhardt River in the Gulf of Carpentaria region and Port Curtis (Gladstone). It was abolished in December 1859 as a result of the separation of Queensland.

The district is one of 4 seats named after Ludwig Leichhardt. The Legislative Assembly of Queensland was established in 1860 and the central Queensland area continued to be part of a district named Leichhardt, until that district was abolished in 1932. New South Wales created the Electoral district of Leichhardt, based on the eponymous suburb in Sydney. The division of Leichhardt, a seat in the Australian House of Representatives was created in 1949.

== Members for Leichhardt ==
Member	Party	Period
William Walsh	None	July - December 1859

== Election results ==
=== Elections in the 1850s ===
==== 1859 ====
1859 New South Wales colonial election: Leichhardt Wednesday 6 July
Candidate	Votes	%
William Walsh (elected)	unopposed	
