= George Lindley =

Australian politician

Member of the Queensland Legislative Assembly for Wide Bay
- In office 11 March 1902 – 18 May 1907
- Preceded by: Charles Jenkinson
- Succeeded by: Harry Walker

Personal details
- Born: George Lindley; 1866 Melbourne, Victoria, Australia
- Died: 19 June 1937 (aged 70) Toowoomba, Queensland, Australia
- Resting place: Drayton and Toowoomba Cemetery
- Party: Ministerialist
- Spouse: Mary Helen Dawson (m.1896)
- Occupation: Pastoralist

George Lindley (1866 - 19 June 1937) was a member of the Queensland Legislative Assembly.

== Biography ==
Lindley was born in Melbourne, Victoria, the son of Anthony Bray Lindley and his wife Elizabeth (née Lockington). After arriving in Queensland he worked on his father's pastoral pursuits at Curra, Tiaro and Wide Bay before establishing an auctioneering business in Brisbane in 1903. He then was a real estate agent, working out of Toowoomba.

On 7 October 1896, Lindley married Mary Helen Dawson (died 1951) and together had three sons and one daughter. He died in June of 1937 and was buried in the Presbyterian section of the Drayton and Toowoomba Cemetery.

== Public life ==
At the 1902 Queensland state elections, Lindley won the seat of Wide Bay, defeating the sitting member, Charles Jenkinson. He held the seat until he decided not to stand in 1907.

Parliament of Queensland
Preceded by Charles Jenkinson	Member for Wide Bay; 1902–1907	Succeeded by Harry Walker
