= William Gill Bailey =

Australian politician

William Bailey

Member of the Queensland Legislative Assembly for Wide Bay
- In office 12 November 1873 – 17 May 1888 Serving with Thomas Price, Matthew Mellor
- Preceded by: Henry King
- Succeeded by: Horace Tozer

Personal details
- Born: William Gill Bailey; 1833 Teignmouth, Devon, England
- Died: 23 April 1889 (aged 55–56) Woolloongabba, Queensland, Australia
- Resting place: Toowong Cemetery
- Spouse(s): Jane Nash (m.1864 d.1886), Estelle Austin (m.1888)
- Occupation: Farmer

William Gill Bailey (1833–1889) was a politician in Queensland, Australia. He was a Member of the Queensland Legislative Assembly.

== Personal history ==
He was born at East Teignmouth, Devonshire, England. Addition information on his life prior to election to Parliament is available.

== Electoral history ==
He was elected at a By-election as the member for Wide Bay. He served four terms during the period 12 November 1873 – 17 May 1888. During Sir S.W.Griffith's last administration Mr. Bailey served as Government Whip.

== Post-electoral life ==
He retired to Brisbane after his time in the Legislative Assembly and died at his residence in Qualtrough Street Woolloongabba, Brisbane on 23 April 1889. He is buried at Toowong Cemetery, Brisbane, Queensland.

== Obituary ==
Death of Mr W. G. Bailey

Parliament of Queensland
Preceded by Henry King	Member for Wide Bay; 1873–1888; Served alongside: Thomas Price, Matthew Mellor	Succeeded by Horace Tozer
