= Edward MacDevitt =

Australian politician

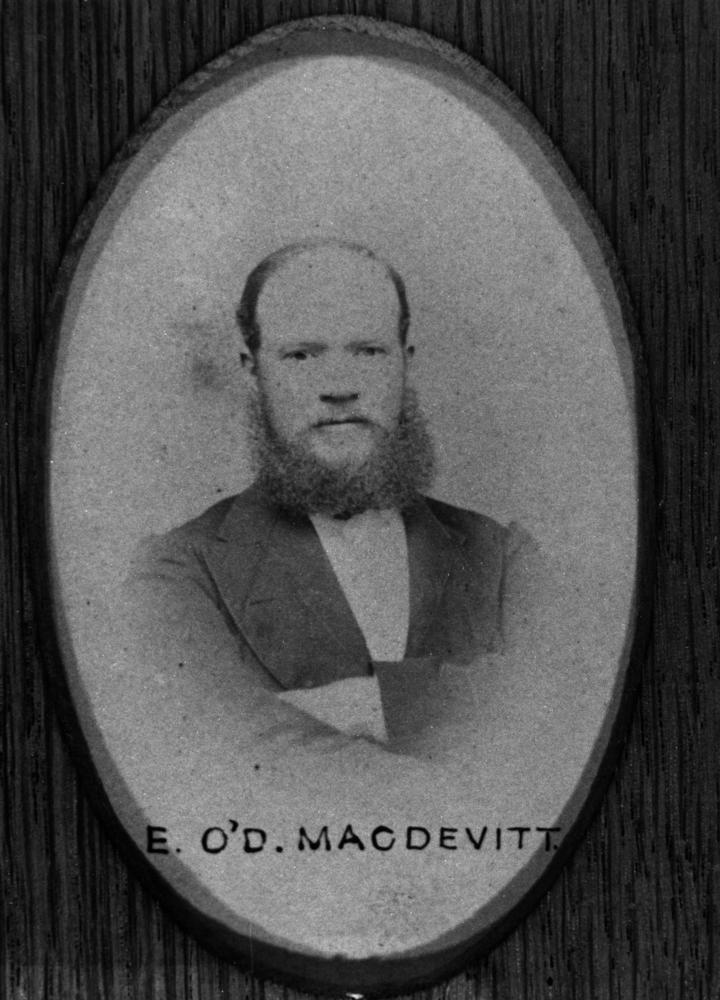
- Edward MacDevitt 1874

Member of the Queensland Legislative Assembly for Kennedy
- In office 15 September 1870 – 18 November 1873
- Preceded by: John Bright
- Succeeded by: John Macrossan

Member of the Queensland Legislative Assembly for Ravenswood
- In office 18 November 1873 – 14 November 1874
- Preceded by: New seat
- Succeeded by: Henry King

Personal details
- Born: Edward O'Donnell MacDevitt; 1843 Glenties, County Donegal, Ireland
- Died: 4 February 1898 (aged 54) Malvern, Victoria, Australia
- Resting place: St Kilda Cemetery
- Spouse: Katy Power
- Occupation: Barrister

Edward MacDevitt was a politician in Queensland, Australia. He was a Member of the Queensland Legislative Assembly.

He represented the Electoral district of Kennedy from 1870 to 1873, and the Electoral district of Ravenswood from 1873 to 1874.

== Career ==
Barrister, Brisbane; Immigration lecturer, Britain, 1874–1876

Barrister, Melbourne and Kalgoorlie WA, 1897–1898

== Personal life ==
He was born 1843 in Glenties, County Donegal, Ireland and died 1898 in Melbourne while trying to learn to ride a bike during a heatwave.

Parliament of Queensland
| Preceded by John Bright | Member for Kennedy; 1870–1873 | Succeeded by John Macrossan |
| New seat | Member for Ravenswood; 1873–1874 | Succeeded by Henry King |
