= Electoral district of Burnett (New South Wales) =

Former state electoral district of New South Wales, Australia

Burnett New South Wales—Legislative Assembly
- State: New South Wales
- Created: July 1859
- Abolished: December 1859
- Namesake: Burnett River

The Burnett was an electoral district of the Legislative Assembly in the Australian state of New South Wales created for the July 1859 election and named after the Burnett River. It was abolished in December 1859 as a result of the separation of Queensland.

== Members for Burnett ==
Member	Party	Period
Gilbert Eliott	None	1859–1859

== Election results ==
=== 1859 ===
1859 New South Wales colonial election: The Burnett Tuesday 5 July
Candidate	Votes	%
Gilbert Eliott (elected)	191	72.1
George Howard	74	27.9
Total formal votes	265	100.0
Informal votes	0	0.0
Turnout	265	40.1
