= Gilbert Eliott (Australian politician) =

Australian politician

Gilbert Eliott CMG, JP
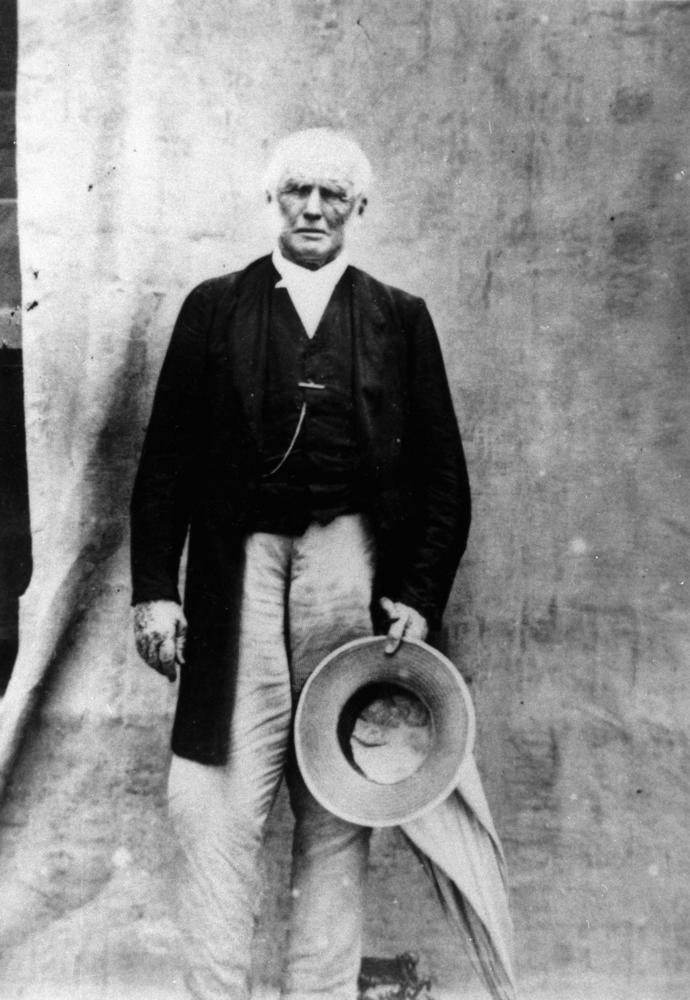

Speaker of the Queensland Legislative Assembly
- In office 22 May 1860 – 13 July 1870
- Preceded by: New title
- Succeeded by: Arthur Macalister
- Constituency: Wide Bay

Member of the New South Wales Legislative Assembly for Burnett
- In office 5 July 1859 – 10 December 1859
- Preceded by: New seat
- Succeeded by: Seat abolished

Member of the Queensland Legislative Assembly for Wide Bay
- In office 4 May 1860 – 12 August 1870
- Preceded by: New seat
- Succeeded by: Henry King

Member of the Queensland Legislative Council
- In office 15 November 1870 – 30 June 1871

Personal details
- Born: Gilbert Eliott; 1796 Stobs Castle, Roxburghshire, England
- Died: 30 June 1871 (aged 74–75) Toowoomba, Queensland, Australia
- Resting place: Drayton and Toowoomba Cemetery
- Spouse: Isabella Lucy Elliot
- Relations: Sir William Eliott, 6th Baronet (father)
- Occupation: Grazier, Magistrate

Gilbert Eliott CMG (1796 – 30 June 1871), was a politician in colonial Queensland, Australia and a Speaker of the Queensland Legislative Assembly.

== Early life ==
Eliot was third son of Sir William Eliott, the 6th Bart. of that name, of Stobs, Roxburghshire. He was born in 1796, and married, in 1830, Isabella Lucy, daughter of the Rev. Robert Eliott, vicar of Askham (who died in 1871).

== Politics ==
Eliott emigrated to Australia, and was appointed a police magistrate at Parramatta in June 1842. He became chief of the three commissioners of the city of Sydney in January 1842.

in July 1859 was elected to the New South Wales Legislative Assembly as the member for Burnett but had only served 5 months when the Colony of Queensland was created and his seat became redundant. He was then elected to the first Queensland Legislative Assembly in April 1860, as member for Wide Bay. On the meeting of the House in May he was elected the first Speaker, and, having been thrice successively re-elected in the next three Parliaments, voluntarily retired in Nov. 1870, when he was created C.M.G.

== Later life ==
Eliott died on 30 June 1871 and was buried in Drayton and Toowoomba Cemetery.

Eliott's eldest son, Gilbert William, was a police magistrate in Queensland from 1865 to 1878; and, by his marriage with Jane Penelope, daughter of Thomas Thomson, of Tasmania, had a son, Gilbert Francis Eliott, born in 1859, who was Engineer of Harbours and Rivers for Northern Queensland.

His ceremonial sword is now on display at the Maryborough Military and Colonial Museum on the Fraser Coast.

Parliament of New South Wales
New seat	Member for Burnett; 1859–1859	Seat abolished
Parliament of Queensland
New title	Speaker of the Legislative Assembly; 1860 – 1870	Succeeded by Arthur Macalister
New seat	Member for Wide Bay; 1860–1870	Succeeded by Henry King
