= Electoral district of Cooroora =

Cooroora Queensland—Legislative Assembly
- Electorate map, 1921
- State: Queensland
- Created: 1912
- Abolished: 1992
- Namesake: Mount Cooroora

Cooroora was an electoral district of the Legislative Assembly in the Australian state of Queensland from 1912 to 1992.

It was based mainly on the area of the district of Wide Bay and named after Mount Cooroora, near the town of Pomona.

Cooroora was mainly a safe Country/National seat but was one of the many seats that Labor won in the 1989 election landslide.

It was abolished in the 1991 redistribution under the Goss government, and its territory was distributed between the new districts of Noosa and Maroochydore.

== Members for Cooroora ==
Member	Party	Term
Harry Walker	Liberal	1912–1918
Harry Walker	National	1918–1920
Harry Walker	Country	1920–1925
Harry Walker	CPNP	1925–1936
Harry Walker	Country	1936–1947
David Low	Country	1947–1974
Gordon Simpson	National	1974–1989
Ray Barber	Labor	1989–1992

== See also ==
- Electoral districts of Queensland
- Members of the Queensland Legislative Assembly by year
- Category:Members of the Queensland Legislative Assembly by name
