= Horace Tozer =

Australian politician (1844–1916)

Sir Horace Tozer KCMG
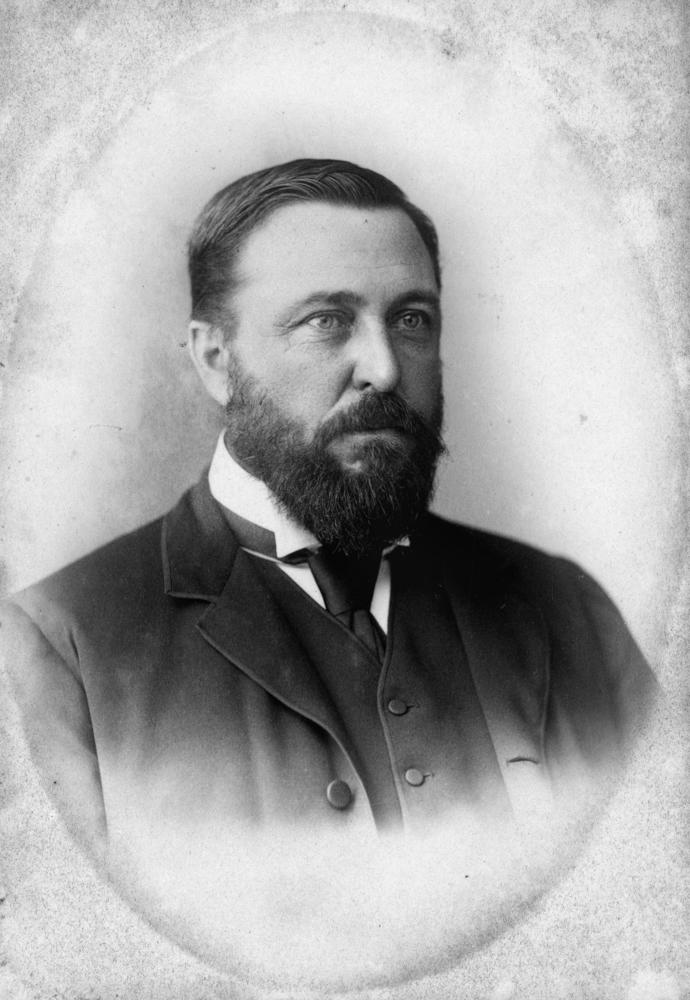

Member of the Queensland Legislative Assembly for Wide Bay
- In office 13 July 1871 – 23 September 1871
- Preceded by: Henry King
- Succeeded by: Henry King
- In office 17 May 1888 – 2 March 1898
- Preceded by: William Bailey
- Succeeded by: Charles Jenkinson

Personal details
- Born: Horace Tozer; 23 April 1844 Port Macquarie, New South Wales, Australia
- Died: 20 August 1916 (aged 72) South Brisbane, Queensland, Australia
- Resting place: Toowong Cemetery
- Party: Ministerial
- Spouse(s): Mary Hoyles Wilson (m.1868 d.1878), Louisa Lord (m.1880 d.1908)
- Relations: Vivian Tozer (son)
- Occupation: Solicitor

Sir Horace Tozer KCMG (23 April 1844 – 20 August 1916) was an Australian lawyer and politician. He was a Member of the Queensland Legislative Assembly.

== Early life ==
Tozer was son of H. T. N. Tozer. He was born in April 1844 in Port Macquarie, New South Wales and attended the Collegiate School in Newcastle. He then became a solicitor in Brisbane and started a successful legal practice in Gympie. He married twice, in 1868 at Ipswich to Mary Hoyles Wilson (who died in Ipswich in 1878), and in 1880 to Louisa Lord (who died in London in 1908).

== Political life ==
In the 1871 election held on 13 July, the sitting member for Wide Bay in the Queensland Legislative Assembly, Henry Edward King, decided to contest the electoral district of Maryborough instead of Wide Bay. King supported the nomination of Horace Tozer for Wide Bay, amidst allegations that Tozer was just a "warming pan" intended to hold the seat as a protection against King failing to win Maryborough. Tozer was elected in Wide Bay but King's bid for Maryborough failed. The allegations of Tozer being a "warming pan" proved true as Tozer promptly resigned, recommending that the electors of Wide Bay should elect King at the subsequent by-election. King's nomination was unopposed and he was declared elected on 4 October 1871.

In 1880, Tozer was elected was an alderman in Gympie's first town council.

On 17 May 1888 he was elected again as the member for Wide Bay. He was colonial secretary between 1890 and 1893, and then became home secretary until 1898.

On 2 March 1898, he resigned his seat in order to be appointed as Agent-General for Queensland. He retired due to his health in 1909.

== Later years and death ==
He died at the home of his daughter, Amy Lavinia Norton in South Brisbane on 20 August 1916. He was survived by two sons and two daughters. A private funeral was held and he was buried in Toowong Cemetery.

His son Vivian Tozer also served in the Queensland Legislative Assembly, representing Gympie.

Tozer's legal offices in Gympie (Tozer's Building) is listed on the Queensland Heritage Register.

Parliament of Queensland
Preceded by Henry King	Member for Wide Bay; 1871–1871	Succeeded by Henry King
Preceded by William Bailey	Member for Wide Bay; 1888–1898	Succeeded by Charles Jenkinson
