= Electoral district of Wide Bay =

Former state electoral district of Queensland, Australia

Wide Bay Queensland—Legislative Assembly
- State: Queensland
- Created: 1859
- Abolished: 1950
- Namesake: Wide Bay–Burnett

Wide Bay was a Legislative Assembly electorate in the state of Queensland.

== History ==
Wide Bay was one of the 16 original electorates of 1859; it centred on Maryborough but also included the coastal strip from the Mooloolah River, north to Bustard Head near Gladstone. However, in 1864, the Electoral district of Maryborough was established and the Wide Bay electorate contracted towards the south of Maryborough but still include the rural areas around Maryborough. Initially Wide Bay was a single member constituency, but from 1878 to 1888 it became a two-member constituency, after which it reverted to a single member. In the 1949 redistribution, taking effect in 1950, Wide Bay was abolished, being split up between the Electoral district of Marodian and the Electoral district of Nash.

=== 1871 ===
In the 1871 election held on 13 July, the sitting member for Wide Bay, Henry King, decided to contest the electoral district of Maryborough instead of Wide Bay. King supported the nomination of Horace Tozer for Wide Bay, amidst allegations that Tozer was just a "warming pan" intended to hold the seat as a protection against King failing to win Maryborough. Tozer was elected in Wide Bay but King's bid for Maryborough failed. The allegations of Tozer being a "warming pan" proved true as Tozer promptly resigned, recommending that the electors of Wide Bay should elect King at the subsequent by-election. King's nomination was unopposed and he was declared elected on 4 October 1871.

=== 1898 ===
On 2 March 1898, Horace Tozer resigned his seat in order to be appointed as Agent-General for Queensland. Charles Jenkinson was elected in the subsequent by-election.

== Members ==
The electorate was represented by the following members:

Member	Party	Term			
Gilbert Eliott	none	4 May 1860 – 12 Aug 1870			
Henry King	none	12 Aug 1870 – 13 Jul 1871			
Horace Tozer ^{[a]}	Ministerial	13 Jul 1871 – 23 Sep 1871			
Henry King	none	4 Oct 1871 – 12 Nov 1873	Two members 1878–1888		
William Bailey	none	12 Nov 1873 – 17 May 1888	Member 2	Party	Term
William Bailey	none	12 Nov 1873 – 17 May 1888	Thomas Price	none	23 Nov 1878 – 7 Sep 1883
William Bailey	none	12 Nov 1873 – 17 May 1888	Matthew Mellor	none	7 Sep 1883 – 4 May 1888
Horace Tozer ^{[b]}	Ministerial	17 May 1888 – 2 Mar 1898			
Charles Jenkinson ^{[by]}	Opposition	19 Mar 1898 – 11 Mar 1902			
George Lindley	Ministerial	11 Mar 1902 – 18 May 1907			
Harry Walker	Opposition	18 May 1907 – 4 Feb 1908			
Harry Walker	Liberal	5 Feb 1908 – 27 Apr 1912			
Charles Booker	Liberal	27 Apr 1912 – 16 Mar 1918			
Andrew Thompson	Labor	16 Mar 1918 – 9 Oct 1920			
Harry Clayton ^{[d]}	Country	9 Oct 1920 – 30 Dec 1946			
James Heading	Country	3 May 1947 – 29 Apr 1950			

^{[a]} "warming pan", resigned to make way for Henry Edward King
^{[b]} resigned to become Agent-General for Queensland
^{[by]} won in by-election
^{[d]} died in office

== See also ==
- Electoral districts of Queensland
- Members of the Queensland Legislative Assembly by year
- Category:Members of the Queensland Legislative Assembly by name
