= John Barounis =

Australian politician

John Barounis MP

Member of the Queensland Legislative Assembly for Maryborough
- Incumbent
- Assumed office 26 October 2024
- Preceded by: Bruce Saunders

Personal details
- Born: Kalamata, Greece
- Party: Liberal National

John Barounis (Greek: Τζον Μπαρούνης) is a Greek Australian politician who has been a member of the Legislative Assembly of Queensland since 2024, representing the district of Maryborough for the Liberal National Party (LNP).

== Early life ==
Barounis was born in Kalamata, Greece and served in the Hellenic Armed Forces. While in Athens, he met his wife, Tricia. The couple later migrated to Australia, eventually settling in Maryborough. Barounis managed various businesses across Queensland and New Zealand.

== Political career ==
In 2023, Barounis was preselected as the Liberal National Party candidate for Maryborough. He won the seat in the 2024 Queensland state election, defeating Bruce Saunders who had held the district since the 2015 Queensland state election.

== Personal life ==
Barounis is married to Tricia, and they have two children, Zoe and Yannis. In 2018, Yannis died by suicide. In response, the family initiated a project to plant 200 trees across Maryborough as a tribute to Yiannis.

Parliament of Queensland
Preceded by Bruce Saunders	Member for Maryborough; 2024–present	Incumbent
