= Henry Palmer (Australian politician) =

Australian politician

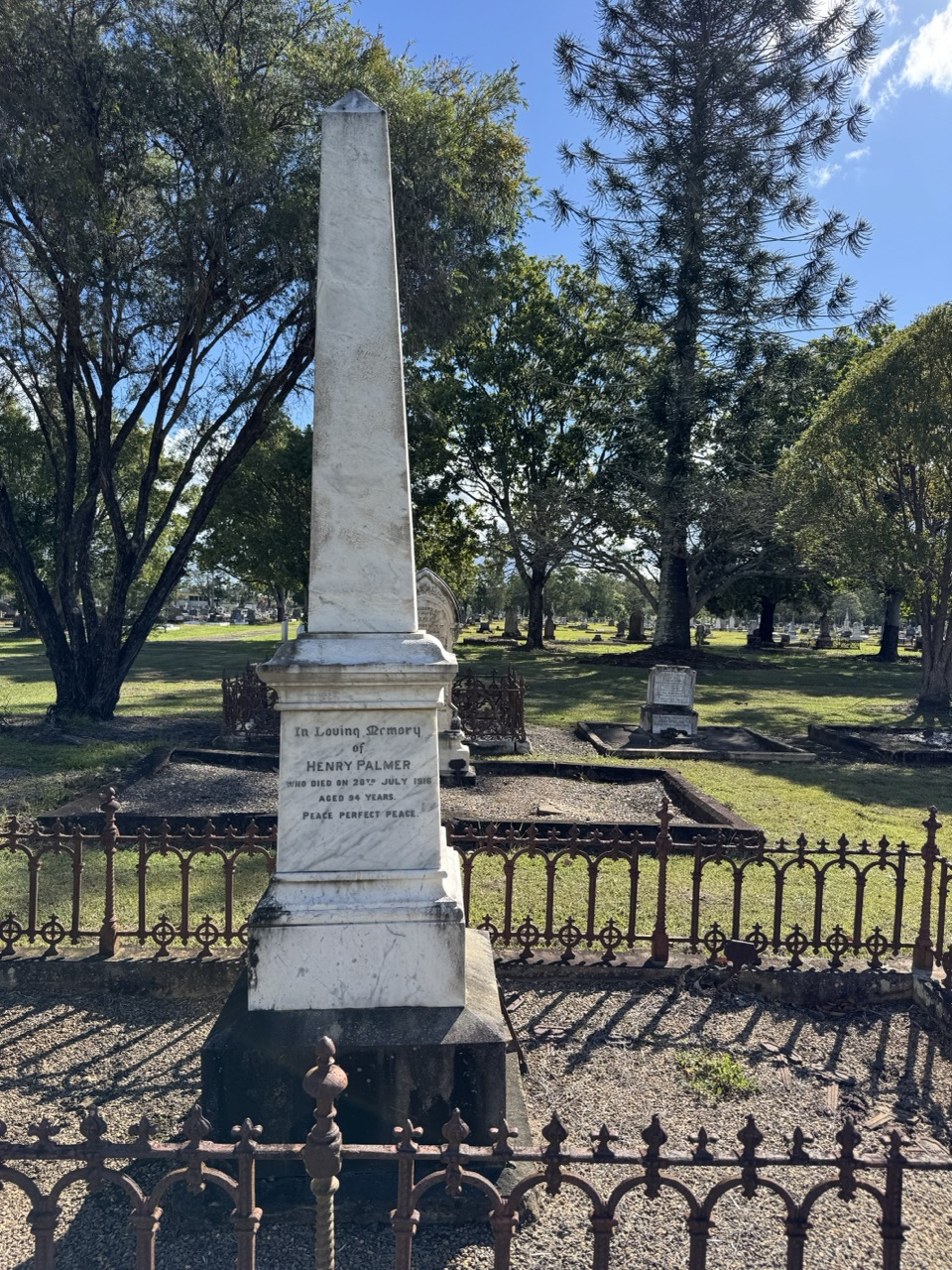
- Palmer's grave in 2025.

Member of the Queensland Legislative Assembly for Maryborough
- In office 13 December 1880 – 17 August 1883 Serving with Henry King
- Preceded by: John Douglas
- Succeeded by: John Hurley

Personal details
- Born: Henry Palmer; September 1821 Birr, King's County, Ireland
- Died: 19 July 1916 (aged 94) Maryborough, Queensland, Australia
- Resting place: Maryborough Cemetery
- Spouse: Hannah Foster
- Relatives: John Palmer (brother)
- Occupation: Company director

Henry Palmer (September 1821 - 19 July 1916) was a member of the Queensland Legislative Assembly.

== Biography ==
Palmer was born at Birr, King's County, Ireland. After he arrived in Australia he took up pastoral pursuits in Victoria and became a drover in Queensland. In 1856 he established a store and then was a director of the Maryborough Sugar Company.

Palmer was married to Hannah Foster and together they had two sons. Palmer died in July 1916 and his funeral proceeded from his former residence in Kent Street to the Maryborough Cemetery.

Palmer's younger brother John Palmer was the first mayor of Rockhampton. Their brother Richard Palmer had established the first general merchant store in Rockhampton in 1856, which John Palmer ultimately took over in 1858.

== Public career ==
Palmer was a councillor on the Maryborough Shire Council and in 1861 was the town's first Mayor. He then contested the seat of Maryborough at the 1873 Queensland colonial election but lost to Berkeley Moreton. He then won the 1880 by-election that was brought on by the resignation of John Douglas, defeating John Hurley and William Keith.

He stood for re-election at the 1883 Queensland colonial election but was defeated by John Hurley and Richard Sheridan.

Parliament of Queensland
Preceded by John Douglas	Member for Maryborough; 1880–1883; Served alongside: Henry King	Succeeded by John Hurley
