= Electoral district of Ravenswood =

Legislative Assembly electorate in the state of Queensland

Ravenswood Queensland—Legislative Assembly
- State: Queensland
- Created: 1873
- Abolished: 1878

The electoral district of Ravenswood was a Legislative Assembly electorate in the state of Queensland.

== History ==
Ravenswood was created by the Electoral Districts Act in 1872, but the seat existed for only the one Parliament before being abolished in the 1877 redistribution.

== Members ==
The following people represented Ravenswood:

Member	Party	Term
Edward O'Donnell MacDevitt	none	18 Nov 1873 – 13 Nov 1874
Henry Edward King	none	9 Dec 1874^{b} – 14 Nov 1878

^{b}=by-election

== See also ==
- Electoral districts of Queensland
- Members of the Queensland Legislative Assembly by year
- Category:Members of the Queensland Legislative Assembly by name
