= Anne Maddern =

Australian politician

Member of the Queensland Parliament for Maryborough
- In office 24 March 2012 – 31 January 2015
- Preceded by: Chris Foley
- Succeeded by: Bruce Saunders

Personal details
- Born: 28 October 1955 (age 70)
- Party: Liberal National

Marguerite Anne Maddern (born 28 October 1955) is an Australian Liberal National politician who was the member of the Legislative Assembly of Queensland for Maryborough from 2012 to 2015, having defeated Chris Foley at the 2012 state election. She held the seat for one term, losing to Bruce Saunders at the 2015 Queensland State election.

In 2016, Maddern was elected to the Fraser Coast Regional Council as the councillor for Division 2. She retired at the 2020 local government elections.

Parliament of Queensland
Preceded by Chris Foley	Member for Maryborough; 2012–2015	Succeeded by Bruce Saunders
