= Horace Davies =

Australian politician

Member of the Queensland Legislative Assembly for Maryborough
- In office 28 November 1953 – 4 June 1971
- Preceded by: David Farrell
- Succeeded by: Gilbert Alison

Personal details
- Born: Horace Jason Davies; 17 July 1903 Gympie, Queensland, Australia
- Died: 4 June 1971 (aged 67) South Brisbane, Queensland, Australia
- Party: Labor
- Spouse: Ruby Ellis (m. 1935)
- Occupation: School teacher

Horace Jason Davies (17 July 1903 – 4 June 1971) was a member of the Queensland Legislative Assembly.

== Biography ==
Davies was born in Gympie, Queensland, the son of John Jason Davies and his wife Ellen Christiana (née Christensen). He was educated at Woongarra State School and, except for a two-year period when he was an exchange teacher with the London County Council between 1935 and 1937, for his entire working life taught at schools across Queensland.

On 13 November 1935 he married Ruby Ellis and together had one daughter. Davies died of an enlarged heart in June 1971 and was cremated at the Mt Thompson Crematorium.

== Public career ==
When David Farrell the member for Maryborough in the Queensland Legislative Assembly died in 1953, Davies won the by-election held in November of that year to find a replacement. Neither the Liberal Party nor the Country Party contested the by-election and Davies easily defeated his lone opponent, Ralph Stafford, an alderman on the Maryborough City Council who stood as an independent.

Davies went on to represent the electorate until his own death in 1971. During his time in parliament he was the Opposition Whip from 1960 until his death and also the Shadow Minister for Education. He was a musician of wide accomplishment and was conductor of the Maryborough Choral Society. He was also President of the Wide Bay National Fitness Club and patron and founder of the Maryborough and Hervey Bay Blue Nursing Service.

Parliament of Queensland
| Preceded by David Farrell | Member for Maryborough; 1953–1971 | Succeeded by Gilbert Alison |
