= Bob Dollin =

Australian politician (1928–2021)

Member of the Queensland Legislative Assembly for Maryborough
- In office 2 December 1989 – 13 June 1998
- Preceded by: Gilbert Alison
- Succeeded by: John Kingston

Personal details
- Born: Robert Henry Dollin; 6 December 1928 Kyogle, New South Wales, Australia
- Died: 5 November 2021 (aged 92) Hervey Bay, Queensland, Australia
- Party: Labor
- Spouse: Verlie Dollin
- Children: 5
- Occupation: Timber industry manager

Robert Henry Dollin (6 December 1928 – 5 November 2021) was an Australian politician.

Dollin was born at Kyogle in New South Wales, and worked as a manager in the timber industry before entering politics. A member of the Labor Party, he was a delegate to the Queensland state council. In 1989 he was elected to the Queensland Legislative Assembly as the member for Maryborough. He served on the backbenches until 1998, when he was defeated by a One Nation candidate.

Dollin was married to his wife Verlie, and they had five children. He died on 5 November 2021 at St Stephen's Hospital in Hervey Bay, Queensland, at the age of 92.

Parliament of Queensland
Preceded by Gilbert Alison	Member for Maryborough; 1989–1998	Succeeded by John Kingston
