= David Farrell (politician) =

Australian politician

Member of the Queensland Legislative Assembly for Maryborough
- In office 2 April 1938 – 17 August 1953
- Preceded by: William Demaine
- Succeeded by: Horace Davies

Personal details
- Born: David John Farrell; 5 September 1891 Eidsvold, Queensland, Australia
- Died: 17 August 1953 (aged 61) Maryborough, Queensland, Australia
- Resting place: Maryborough Cemetery
- Party: Labor
- Spouse: Margretta Maud Lillian McKenzie (m. 1923 d.1979)
- Relations: George Farrell (brother)
- Occupation: Engine driver

David John Farrell (5 September 1891 - 17 August 1953) was a member of the Queensland Legislative Assembly.

== Biography ==
Farrell was born in Eidsvold, Queensland, the son of Joseph McKinnon Farrell and his wife Mary (née Maclaughlin) who were pioneers of the district. When he was aged nine his family moved to Howard where he was educated at the local State School and on leaving at age 13 went to work for the Queensland Colliery Company as a pit boy and later became an engine driver.

He enlisted with the First Australian Imperial Force at the outbreak of World War I and served with the 42nd Battalion rising to the rank of Sergeant. He was wounded a number of times in France and returned to Australia in 1919.

In 1923 he married Margretta Maud Lillian McKenzie (died 1979) but remained childless. Farrell died of a cerebral hemorrhage at the Demaine Private Hospital in August 1953 with his funeral proceeding from St Stephen's Presbyterian Church in Maryborough, to the Maryborough Cemetery.

== Public career ==
When the member for Maryborough, William Demaine, retired at the 1938 Queensland state election, Farrell was chosen as his replacement to represent the Labor Party. He easily won the election, defeating the United Australia Party and Social Credit candidates. He went on to represent the electorate for the next fifteen years, dying in office in 1953.

While never a Minister during his time in Parliament, he held several other roles:

- Government Whip 24 April 1944 - 28 August 1950
- Temporary Chairman of Committees 2 August 1950 - 28 August 1950
- Acting Chairman of Committees 29 August 1950 - 4 August 1950
- Chairman of Committees 10 October 1950 - 17 August 1953

Farrell was a member of the Maryborough Hospital Board and the Doon Villa Bowls Club. He was also secretary of the Burrum District Hospital Board, the Burrum District Medical Association, and Federated Engine Drivers and Firemen's Association (Howard Branch). He was involved in the RSSAILA and was Provincial Grand Master of the Freemasons.

The Farrell family was well known in Queensland politics. His brother George Farrell, was the MLA for Rockhampton in the 1920s, and another brother, Joseph, was Chairman of the Burrum Shire Council. A third brother, John, was a colonel in the army and a school inspector.

Parliament of Queensland
Preceded by William Demaine	Member for Maryborough; 1938–1953	Succeeded by Horace Davies
