= Gilbert Alison =

Australian politician

Gil Alison
- Alison in 1989

Member of the Queensland Legislative Assembly for Maryborough
- In office 24 July 1971 – 12 November 1977
- Preceded by: Horace Davies
- Succeeded by: Brendan Hansen
- In office 22 October 1983 – 2 December 1989
- Preceded by: Brendan Hansen
- Succeeded by: Bob Dollin

Personal details
- Born: Gilbert Alison; 20 May 1933 (age 93) Maryborough, Queensland, Australia
- Party: National Party (1983–1989)
- Other political affiliations: Liberal Party (1971–1977)
- Spouse: Florence Barbeler
- Education: University of Queensland
- Occupation: Accountant

Gilbert Alison is an Australian politician. He served as a Liberal Party member of the Legislative Assembly of Queensland for the seat of Maryborough from 1971 until his defeat in 1977, before returning at the 1983 election as a member of the National Party. He served as Minister for Main Roads and Racing in the short-lived government of Russell Cooper between 25 September and 7 December 1989, before again being defeated and retiring from politics.

Parliament of Queensland
Preceded by Horace Davies	Member for Maryborough; 1971–1977	Succeeded by Brendan Hansen
Preceded by Brendan Hansen	Member for Maryborough; 1983–1989	Succeeded by Bob Dollin
