= Gordon Simpson (Australian politician) =

Australian politician

Member of the Queensland Legislative Assembly for Cooroora
- In office 7 December 1974 – 2 December 1989
- Preceded by: David Low
- Succeeded by: Ray Barber

Personal details
- Born: Gordon Leslie Simpson; 3 June 1929 Sea Lake, Victoria, Australia
- Died: 10 May 2017 (aged 87) Nambour, Queensland, Australia
- Party: National Party
- Spouse: Norma Start (m.1953)
- Occupation: Agronomist, Journalist, Company director

Gordon Leslie Simpson (3 June 1929 – 10 May 2017) was an Australian politician.

Simpson was the National Party member for Cooroora from 1974 to 1989 and served as Minister for Mines and Energy and Minister for the Arts from 25 November to 1 December 1987. His daughter, Fiona Simpson, is also a National Party politician. He died in Nambour, Australia on 10 May 2017, aged 87.

Parliament of Queensland
Preceded by David Low	Member for Cooroora; 1974–1989	Succeeded by Ray Barber
