= Ray Barber (politician) =

Australian politician

Member of the Queensland Legislative Assembly for Cooroora
- In office 2 December 1989 – 19 September 1992
- Preceded by: Gordon Simpson
- Succeeded by: Seat abolished

Personal details
- Born: Raymond Douglas Barber; 28 February 1959 (age 67) Waratah, New South Wales, Australia
- Party: Labor
- Occupation: Solicitor

Raymond Douglas "Ray" Barber (born 28 February 1959) is an Australian former politician.

He was born in Waratah, New South Wales to Graham Douglas Barber, a building surveyor for local government, and Fae Aileen, née Edmonds, a high school deputy principal. He attended primary school at Orange East, Undercliffe and West Pennant Hills, and then Pennant Hills High School. The family moved to Queensland in 1973, where Barber attended Nambour State High School before studying for a Bachelor of Arts (1980) and Bachelor of Law (1983) at the University of Queensland. From 1983 he was a partner in Dobbyn & Partners, a law firm at Coolum Beach. He was also a founding member of Sunshine Coast Community Legal Service, and was involved in the local surfing community as honorary solicitor of the Sunshine branch of the Surf Lifesaving Association, treasurer of Coolum Boardriders, and a founding member of Coolum Christian Surfers.

A member of the Labor Party, Barber was elected to the Queensland Legislative Assembly in 1989 as the member for Cooroora. The seat was abolished in 1992, and Barber ran instead for the new seat of Noosa, but was defeated. In March 1993 he married Nikki Parkinson, a reporter and publicist. They were divorced in 2003.

At the 2012 state election, he was the unsuccessful Labor candidate for the safe Liberal National seat of Maroochydore.

Parliament of Queensland
Preceded by Gordon Simpson	Member for Cooroora; 1989–1992	Abolished
