= Harry Walker (politician) =

Australian politician (1873–1950)

The Honourable Harry Walker
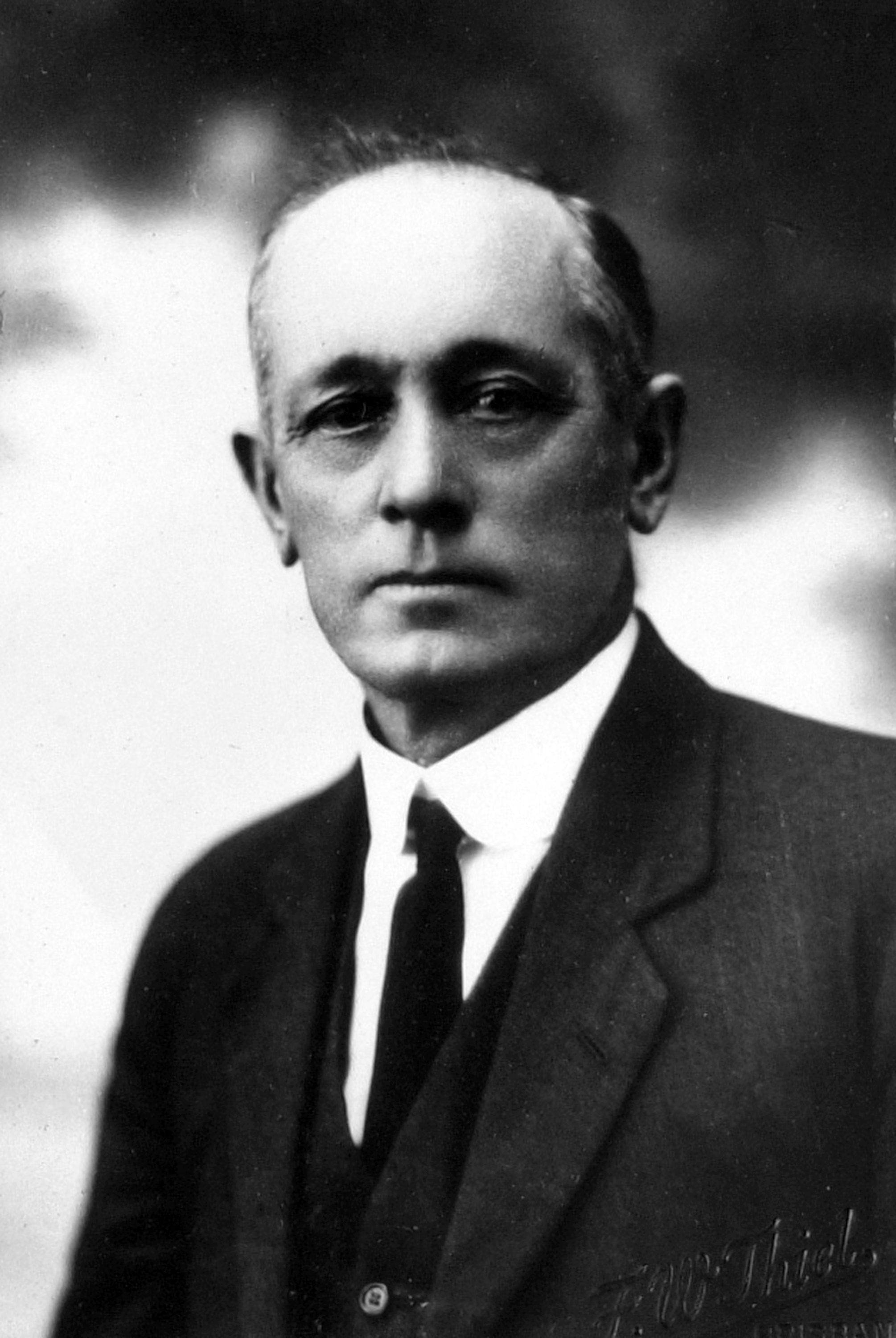

Member of the Queensland Legislative Assembly for Wide Bay
- In office 18 May 1907 – 26 April 1912
- Preceded by: George Lindley
- Succeeded by: Charles Booker

Member of the Queensland Legislative Assembly for Cooroora
- In office 27 Apr 1912 – 3 May 1947
- Preceded by: New seat
- Succeeded by: David Low

Personal details
- Born: Harry Frederick Walker; 15 April 1873 Gympie, Queensland, Australia
- Died: 23 October 1950 (aged 77) Brisbane, Queensland, Australia
- Resting place: Gympie Cemetery
- Party: Country Party
- Other political affiliations: Country and Progressive National Party, CNC, National, Liberal, Ministerial, Opposition
- Spouse: Rosanna Martin (m.1894 d.1961)
- Occupation: Company director

Harry Frederick Walker (15 April 1873 – 23 October 1950) was an Australian company director and member of the Queensland Legislative Assembly.

== Biography ==
Walker was born in Gympie, Queensland, to parents William Henry Walker and his wife Charlotte Caroline (née Stocker) and was educated at One Mile State School, Monkland State School and the local Grammar School. He was a miner and engine-driver in 1890 and in 1897 was part of the Light Horse Jubilee Contingent in London. He fought in the Boer War and by 1906 was the chairman of the Murarrie Bacon Factory and a director of the Wide Bay Cooperative Dairy Co.

In 1903, Walker had acquired a farm at Coles Creek, Gympie and by 1920 he was a farmer at Tewantin.

On the 17 Feb 1894 he married Rosanna Martin (died 1961) and together had three sons and two daughters. He died in Brisbane in 1950 and his body was taken back to Gympie for a state funeral at St Peter's Church and burial at the Gympie Cemetery.

== Political career ==
Walker was a member of the Queensland Legislative Assembly for almost 40 years, most of them in opposition to successive Labor governments.

He represented two different seats, the first being Wide Bay from 1907 until 1912 and the second being Cooroora from its inception in 1912 until he retired from politics in 1947. He was Secretary for Agriculture and Stock in the Moore Ministry from 1929 until 1932.

Parliament of Queensland
Preceded by George Lindley	Member for Wide Bay; 1907–1912	Succeeded by Charles Booker
New seat	Member for Cooroora; 1912–1947	Succeeded by David Low
