= David Low (politician) =

Australian politician

Member of the Queensland Legislative Assembly for Cooroora
- In office 3 May 1947 – 16 October 1974
- Preceded by: Harry Walker
- Succeeded by: Gordon Simpson

Personal details
- Born: David Alan Low; 5 April 1911 Yandina, Queensland, Australia
- Died: 22 October 1974 (aged 63) Brisbane, Queensland, Australia
- Party: Country Party
- Spouse: Claudia Helen Ritchie (m.1939)
- Occupation: Farmer, railway clerk

David Alan Low (5 February 1911 – 22 October 1974) was a railway clerk and member of the Queensland Legislative Assembly.

== Biography ==
Low was born in Yandina, Queensland, to parents John Anthony Low and his wife Louisa Ann (née Bury) and was educated at Nambour State School, Yandina Rural School, and Nambour High Schools. He became a railway clerk at Nambour, Yandina, Kingaroy and Maryborough.

In 1939, he married Claudia Helen Ritchie, with whom he had one daughter. His interests included fishing, surfing, and lawn bowls. He was a member of the Maroochy Masonic Lodge and the Nambour Bowls Club.

David Low Way, a 36 kilometre stretch of road that joins coastal townships of the Sunshine Coast is named in his honour. He died in Brisbane in 1974, six days after resigning his seat in parliament.

== Political career ==
Low, for the Country Party, was the member for Cooroora in the Queensland Legislative Assembly from 1947 until 1974. He was also Chairman of the Maroochy Shire Council from 1952 until 1967.

Parliament of Queensland
Preceded by Harry Walker	Member for Cooroora; 1947–1974	Succeeded by Gordon Simpson
