= William Henry Walsh (politician) =

Australian politician

The Honourable William Henry Walsh JP
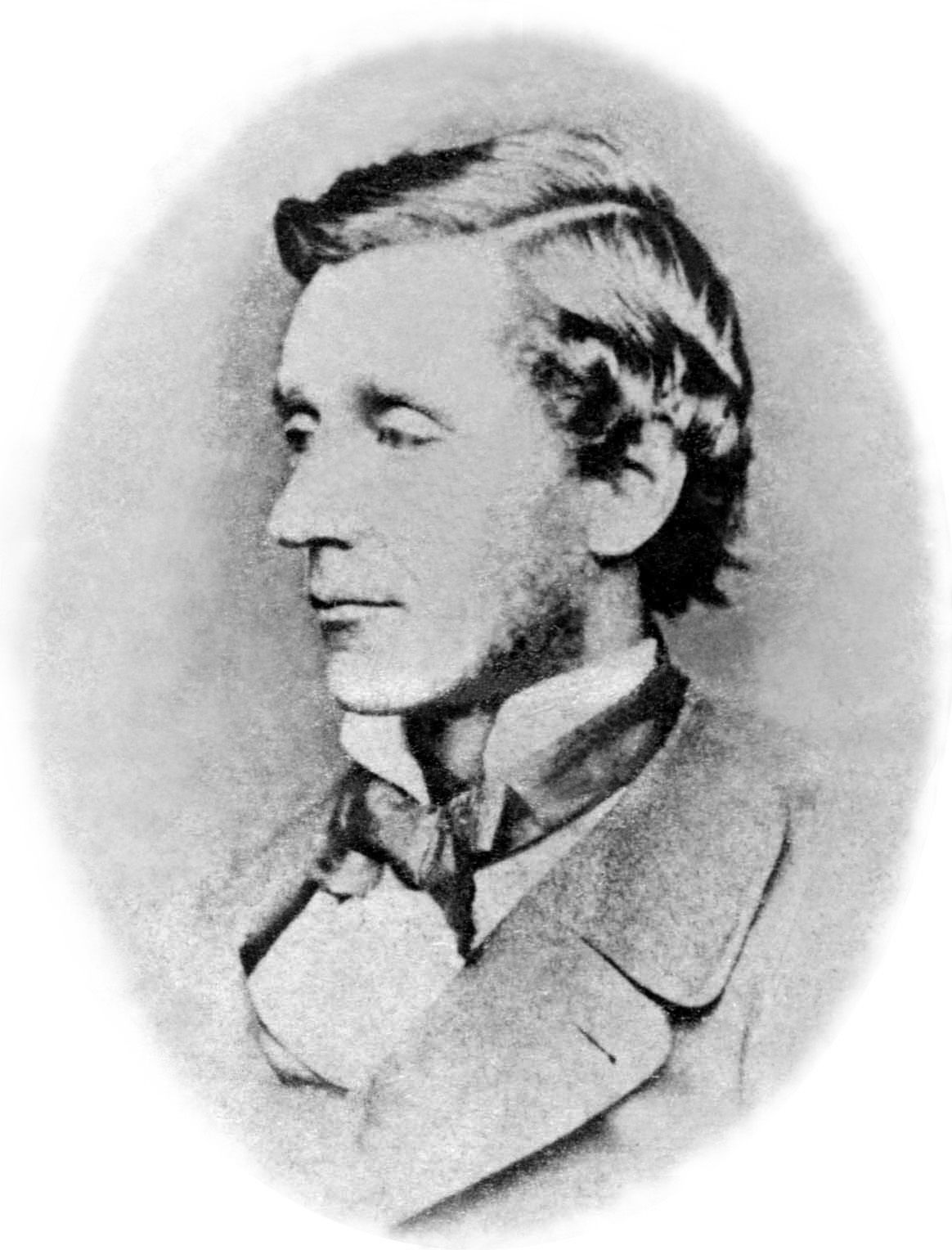
- W. H. Walsh about 1860

Speaker of the Queensland Legislative Assembly
- In office 6 January 1874 – 20 July 1876
- Preceded by: Frederick Forbes
- Succeeded by: Henry King
- Constituency: Warrego

Member of the New South Wales Legislative Assembly for Leichhardt
- In office 15 June 1859 – 10 December 1859
- Preceded by: New seat
- Succeeded by: Seat abolished

Member of the Queensland Legislative Assembly for Maryborough
- In office 1 February 1865 – 4 November 1873
- Preceded by: New seat
- Succeeded by: Berkeley Moreton

Member of the Queensland Legislative Assembly for Warrego
- In office 4 November 1873 – 12 December 1878
- Preceded by: Archibald Buchanan
- Succeeded by: Ernest Stevens

Member of the Queensland Legislative Council
- In office 20 February 1879 – 5 April 1888

Personal details
- Born: William Henry Walsh; 18 December 1823 Milton, Berkshire, England
- Died: 5 April 1888 (aged 64) Brisbane, Queensland, Australia
- Resting place: Toowong Cemetery
- Spouse: Elizabeth Brown (b.1828 m.1857 d.1913)
- Children: Kathleen Maude Walsh, Eliza Walsh, Western Walsh, Alfred Degilbo Walsh, Hilda Walsh, William Walsh & Nugent Walsh
- Occupation: Squatter, Investor

William Henry Walsh JP (18 December 1823 – 5 April 1888) was an Australian pioneer pastoralist or squatter and politician in early Queensland. He was a Member of the New South Wales Legislative Assembly in 1859, Member of the Queensland Legislative Assembly 1865–1878, and a Member of the Queensland Legislative Council 1879–1888. He was the Queensland Minister of the Crown 1870–1873, Speaker in the Queensland Legislative Assembly from 6 January 1874 to 20 July 1876.

== Early life ==
Walsh was supposedly born on 18 December 1823 at Milton, Berkshire, England, son of a solicitor, Charles Walsh, and his wife Elizabeth.

== Pastoralist in New South Wales and Queensland ==
He migrated to Australia on the Mary Sharp arriving 11 June 1844, afterwards gaining a few years of colonial experience working for David Perrier at Bathurst. He then went north to begin a squatting career of his own. In early 1847 he set up, for his former employer, a new station on the Macintyre River in the south-eastern part of the territory of the future Queensland. Shortly thereafter he went into the northern 'unknown' with men and a large flock of sheep financed by the Sydney-based Griffith, Fanning & Co. He subsequently formed the Degilbo and Monduran stations near the present day township of Gayndah in the North Burnett.

During this time, he witnessed the murder of settlers by local Indigenous people and almost was killed himself. In 1850, following the murder of settler Gregory Blaxland, Walsh participated in a massacre of indigenous people on Paddy's Island, details of which he would give during Queensland parliamentary debate several decades later.

Working still for the same company, of which he had then become a co-proprietor, Walsh went further north in July 1853. During this venture he and his men made their mark on Queensland history as the first whites to 'blaze the track' of what is now the section of Bruce Highway between Degilbo in the Burnett to the Boyne Valley at Port Curtis, now Gladstone. Here Walsh formed yet another sheep station which he named Milton, allegedly after his birthplace or childhood home.

On 20 February 1857 at Parramatta, New South Wales, he married the Danish-born (yet Scottish and English descended) Elizabeth Brown (1828–1913), daughter of the Copenhagen-born merchant, John Brown (proprietor of Coulston House, Paterson River, from 1829 to 1837 the proprietor of the North Zealand situated Kokkedal Castle in Denmark).

Afterwards he settled initially as the part owner, later sole proprietor of the vast Monduran and Degilbo stations, setting up the latter as a domicile for himself and his growing family.

== Political life ==
He was a Member of the New South Wales Legislative Assembly in 1859, Member of the Queensland Legislative Assembly from 1865 to 1878, and a Member of the Queensland Legislative Council, from 1879 to 1888. He was the Queensland Minister of the Crown from 1870 to 1873, Speaker in the Queensland Legislative Assembly from 6 January 1874 to 20 July 1876.

Walsh was arguably the most conspicuous and outspoken Tory-conservative politicians in northern New South Wales and Queensland in the period up to the 1870s.

He is today best known for his two decade long strong-worded opposition to the Queensland's Native Police Force and the lack of protection of indigenous people in Queensland, a position which brought him into conflict with Queensland's first Governor Sir George Ferguson Bowen and a number of other Queensland graziers.

In parliament on 4 October 1867 the then minister for police "Colonial Secretary" (later Queensland Premier), Arthur Hunter Palmer, brought an end to Walsh decade long crusade by ironically defending Walsh "perfect right to...pursue his monomania on the subject to any extent he pleased."

Walsh is equally well known for his defence for the Queensland's sugar industry and its use of Melanesians, so-called Kanaka, labour and dismissal that the accusation of this as slavery was anything more than working-class prejudices.

== Later life ==
On 4 April 1888, he was walking from his home in Bulimba towards the Brisbane CBD along Shaftson Road. As he passed the ropeworks, he was hit by a parcel delivery van driver and was knocked unconscious and died the following day (5 April 1888). He was buried in Toowong Cemetery.

== Named in his honour ==
A number of Queensland places were named after him:

- the Walsh River
- the Shire of Walsh (previously the Walsh Division)
- Mount Walsh which is now in the Mount Walsh National Park
- Walshs Pyramid

New South Wales Legislative Assembly
New seat	Member for Leichhardt; 1859	Abolished
Parliament of Queensland
Preceded by Frederick Forbes	Speaker of the Legislative Assembly; 1874 – 1876	Succeeded by Henry King
New seat	Member for Maryborough; 1865–1873	Succeeded by Berkeley Moreton
Preceded by Archibald Buchanan	Member for Warrego; 1873–1878	Succeeded by Ernest Stevens
