= Henry Edward King =

Australian politician (1832–1910)

Henry King
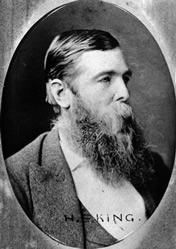

Speaker of the Queensland Legislative Assembly
- In office 25 July 1876 – 26 July 1883
- Preceded by: William Walsh
- Succeeded by: William Groom
- Constituency: Ravenswood, Maryborough

Member of the Queensland Legislative Assembly for Wide Bay
- In office 12 August 1870 – 13 July 1871
- Preceded by: Gilbert Eliott
- Succeeded by: Horace Tozer
- In office 4 October 1871 – 12 November 1873
- Preceded by: Horace Tozer
- Succeeded by: William Bailey

Member of the Queensland Legislative Assembly for Ravenswood
- In office 9 December 1874 – 14 November 1878
- Preceded by: Edward O'Donnell MacDevitt
- Succeeded by: Seat abolished

Member of the Queensland Legislative Assembly for Maryborough
- In office 15 November 1878 – 17 August 1883 Serving with John Douglas, Henry Palmer
- Preceded by: New seat
- Succeeded by: Richard Bingham Sheridan

Personal details
- Born: Henry Edward King; 9 June 1832 Limerick, Ireland
- Died: 5 February 1910 (aged 77) South Brisbane, Queensland, Australia
- Resting place: Toowong Cemetery
- Spouse: Harriette Armstrong
- Occupation: Surveyor, Barrister

Henry Edward King (9 June 1832 – 5 February 1910) was a politician in colonial Queensland, Speaker of the Legislative Assembly of Queensland 1876 to 1883.

King was born in Mount Coote, Limerick, Ireland, son of John Wingfield King and his wife Alicia, née Coote.

King was member of the Legislative Assembly of Queensland for Wide Bay 12 August 1870 to 13 July 1871 and from 4 October 1871 to 12 November 1873; for Ravenswood from 9 December 1874 to 14 November 1878 and for Maryborough from 15 November 1878 to 17 August 1883. King was Secretary for Public Works and Mines in the Macalister Ministry from November 1874 to May 1876. Two months later he was chosen Speaker of the Assembly, and occupied the chair of the House till July 1883. He was an unsuccessful candidate for Maryborough at the 1888 colonial election. He had a wife, with whom he had four sons and three daughters.

King died in South Brisbane, Queensland, on 5 February 1910 and buried in Toowong Cemetery.

Parliament of Queensland
Preceded by William Walsh	Speaker of the Legislative Assembly; 1876 – 1883	Succeeded by William Groom
Preceded by Gilbert Eliott	Member for Wide Bay; 1870–1871	Succeeded by Horace Tozer
Preceded by Horace Tozer	Member for Wide Bay; 1871–1873	Succeeded by William Bailey
Preceded by Edward O'Donnell MacDevitt	Member for Ravenswood; 1874–1878	Abolished
New seat	Member for Maryborough; 1878–1883; Served alongside: John Douglas, Henry Palmer	Succeeded by Richard Bingham Sheridan
