= Chris Foley (politician) =

Australian politician

Chris Foley JP

Member of the Queensland Legislative Assembly for Maryborough
- In office 23 April 2003 – 23 March 2012
- Preceded by: John Kingston
- Succeeded by: Anne Maddern

Personal details
- Born: Christopher John Foley; 25 February 1956 (age 70) Brisbane, Queensland, Australia
- Party: Independent
- Occupation: Certified Financial Planner, Wesleyan Methodist minister

Christopher John Foley (born 25 February 1956) is an Australian politician. Born in Brisbane, he became a certified financial planner and received a Diploma in Christian Doctrine and Practice, was an Associate in Theology, and became a Justice of the Peace. An ordained minister with the Wesleyan Methodist Church of Australia, he is married with five children.

He is now retired now from politics and as a pastor of Grace community church. He was elected as an independent to the Legislative Assembly of Queensland in a 2003 by-election for the seat of Maryborough following the resignation due to ill health of another independent, former One Nation MLA John Kingston. Foley was re-elected at the 2004, 2006 and 2009 elections. He lost his seat at the 2012 election to the Liberal National Party of Queensland candidate Anne Maddern.

Parliament of Queensland
| Preceded by John Kingston | Member for Maryborough; 2003–2012 | Succeeded by Anne Maddern |
