= John Kingston (Australian politician) =

Australian politician (1935–2024)

Dr. John Kingston

Member of the Queensland Legislative Assembly for Maryborough
- In office 13 June 1998 – 24 March 2003
- Preceded by: Bob Dollin
- Succeeded by: Chris Foley

Personal details
- Born: John Allan Kingston; 7 July 1935 Brisbane, Queensland, Australia
- Died: 17 June 2024 (aged 88) Maryborough, Queensland, Australia
- Party: Independent (1996–97; since 1999)
- Other political affiliations: Pauline Hanson's One Nation (1997–1999)
- Spouse: Pahninh Silasack
- Occupation: Management company director (Kingston Rural Management & Supply); Pharmacy chain director (Kingston Pharmacies)
- Profession: Businessman politician

John Allan Kingston (7 July 1935 – 17 June 2024) was an Australian politician. He was a member of the Legislative Assembly of Queensland from 1998 to 2003, representing the electorate of Maryborough.

Kingston was born in Brisbane. He first came to state parliament one of the 11 One Nation candidates elected at the 1998 state election. However, Kingston broke with his party less than a year later and sat as an independent from February 1999. He was re-elected at the 2001 state election before resigning midway through his term in March 2003 citing poor health.

Prior to entering state politics, Kingston was a Maryborough City councillor. He was married to wife Pahninh Silasack with whom he has three adopted children.

Kingston died on 17 June 2024, at the age of 88.

Parliament of Queensland
Preceded by Bob Dollin	Member for Maryborough; 1998–2003	Succeeded by Chris Foley
