= Electoral district of Maryborough (Queensland) =

State electoral district of Queensland, Australia

Maryborough Queensland—Legislative Assembly
- Electoral map of Maryborough 2017
- State: Queensland
- Created: 1865
- MP: John Barounis
- Party: Liberal National
- Namesake: Maryborough
- Electors: 38,267 (2020)
- Area: 4,705 km^{2} (1,816.6 sq mi)
- Demographic: Provincial
- Coordinates: 25°39′S 152°30′E
Electorates around Maryborough:
| Burnett | Burnett | Hervey Bay |
| Callide | Maryborough | Hervey Bay |
| Nanango | Gympie | Gympie |

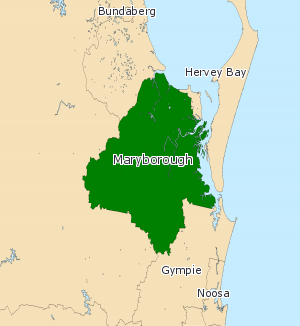
Electoral map of Maryborough 2008

Maryborough is an electoral district of the Legislative Assembly in the Australian state of Queensland.

The district is centred on the regional city of Maryborough and takes in other surrounding communities.

== History ==
In 1864, the Additional Members Act created six additional electoral districts, each returning 1 member:

- Clermont
- Kennedy
- Maryborough
- Mitchell
- Rockhampton
- Warrego

The first elections in these six electorates were held in 1865 (that is, during a parliamentary term and not as part of a general election across Queensland). The nomination date for the election in Maryborough was 30 January 1865 and the election was held on 1 February 1865.

Between 1878 and 1912, the district elected two members, and then returned only a single member to the present time (2014).

== Members for Maryborough ==
The members for Maryborough were:

Single member electorate (1865–1878 and 1912–present)
| Member | Party | Term | | | |
|---|---|---|---|---|---|
| William Henry Walsh | Squatter-Conservative | 1865–1873 | | | |
| Berkeley Basil Moreton | Independent Liberal | 1873–1875 | Dual member electorate (1878–1912) | | |
| John Douglas | Independent Liberal | 1875–1880 | Member 2 | Party | Term |
| John Douglas | Independent Liberal | 1875–1880 | Henry Edward King | Conservative | 1878–1883 |
| Henry Palmer | Conservative | 1880–1883 | Henry Edward King | Conservative | 1878–1883 |
| John Hurley | Unaligned | 1883–1884 | Richard Bingham Sheridan | Liberal | 1883–1888 |
| John Annear | Ministerialist | 1884–1902 | Richard Bingham Sheridan | Liberal | 1883–1888 |
| John Annear | Ministerialist | 1884–1902 | Richard Hyne | Unaligned | 1888–1893 |
| John Annear | Ministerialist | 1884–1902 | Charles Powers | Opposition | 1893–1896 |
| John Annear | Ministerialist | 1884–1902 | John Bartholomew | Ministerialist | 1896–1902 |
| Charles Barton | Labor | 1902–1902 | John Norman | Labor | 1902–1907 |
| Henry Garde | Ministerialist | 1902–1904 | John Norman | Labor | 1902–1907 |
| William Mitchell | Labor | 1904–1909 | John Norman | Labor | 1902–1907 |
| William Mitchell | Labor | 1904–1909 | John Adamson | Labor | 1907–1909 |
| Edward Corser | Ministerialist | 1909–1915 | Charles Booker | Ministerialist | 1909–1912 |
| Alfred Jones | Labor | 1915–1917 | | | |
| David Weir | Labor | 1917–1929 | | | |
| John Blackley | Country and Progressive National | 1929–1932 | | | |
| James Stopford | Labor | 1932–1936 | | | |
| William Demaine | Labor | 1937–1938 | | | |
| David Farrell | Labor | 1938–1953 | | | |
| Horace Davies | Labor | 1953–1971 | | | |
| Gilbert Alison | Liberal | 1971–1977 | | | |
| Brendan Hansen | Labor | 1977–1983 | | | |
| Gilbert Alison | National | 1983–1989 | | | |
| Bob Dollin | Labor | 1989–1998 | | | |
| John Kingston | One Nation | 1998–1999 | | | |
| John Kingston | Independent | 1999–2003 | | | |
| Chris Foley | Independent | 2003–2012 | | | |
| Anne Maddern | Liberal National | 2012–2015 | | | |
| Bruce Saunders | Labor | 2015–2024 | | | |
| John Barounis | Liberal National | 2024–present | | | |

== Election results ==
2024 Queensland state election: Maryborough
| Party | Candidate | Votes | % | ±% |
|---|---|---|---|---|
| Labor | Bruce Saunders | 14,336 | 38.63 | −14.64 |
| Liberal National | John Barounis | 13,593 | 36.63 | +10.33 |
| One Nation | Taryn Gillard | 5,702 | 15.37 | +2.19 |
| Greens | Lauren Granger-Brown | 1,323 | 3.56 | +0.90 |
| Family First | Kerry Petrus | 904 | 2.44 | +2.44 |
| Independent | Jamie Miller | 811 | 2.19 | +2.19 |
| Independent | Daniel James Beattie | 439 | 1.18 | +1.18 |
| Total formal votes | | 37,108 | 95.13 | −1.13 |
| Informal votes | | 1,899 | 4.87 | +1.13 |
| Turnout | | 39,007 | 90.46 | +0.00 |
Two-party-preferred result
| Liberal National | John Barounis | 19,609 | 52.84 | +14.73 |
| Labor | Bruce Saunders | 17,499 | 47.16 | −14.73 |
| Liberal National gain from Labor | | Swing | +14.73 | |
