= Electoral results for the district of Charters Towers =

Queensland, Australia, district election results

This is a list of electoral results for the electoral district of Charters Towers in Queensland state elections.

== Members for Charters Towers ==
First incarnation (1888–1912, 2 members)
Member	Party	Term	Member	Party	Term
Robert Sayers	Unaligned	1888–1893	Sir Arthur Rutledge	Ministerialist	1888–1893
Anderson Dawson	Labor	1893–1901	John Dunsford	Labor	1893–1905
John Burrows	Labor	1901–1907	John Dunsford	Labor	1893–1905
John Burrows	Labor	1901–1907	William Paull	Opposition	1905–1908
Joe Millican	Opposition	1907–1908	William Paull	Opposition	1905–1908
Vernon Winstanley	Labor	1908–1912	John Mullan	Labor	1908–1912

Second incarnation (1912–1960, 1 member)
Member	Party	Term
Robert Williams	Ministerialist	1912–1915
William Wellington	Labor	1915–1939
Arthur Jones	Labor	1939–1957
Arthur Jones	Queensland Labor	1957–1960

Third incarnation (1992–2009, 1 member)
Member	Party	Term
Rob Mitchell	National	1992–2001
Christine Scott	Labor	2001–2004
Shane Knuth	National	2004–2008
Shane Knuth	Liberal National	2008–2009

== Election results ==
=== Elections in the 2000s ===
The results for the 2006 election were:

2006 Queensland state election: Charters Towers
Party	Candidate	Votes	%	±%
National	Shane Knuth	10,136	61.05	+14.28
Labor	Bruce Scott	6,468	38.95	−4.62
Total formal votes		16,604	98.58	−0.18
Informal votes		240	1.42	+0.18
Turnout		16,844	90.96	−1.32
National hold		Swing	+8.34	

2004 Queensland state election: Charters Towers
Party	Candidate	Votes	%	±%
National	Shane Knuth	7,910	46.77	+12.19
Labor	Christine Scott	7,369	43.57	−0.21
One Nation	Jerry Burnett	1,635	9.67	−11.97
Total formal votes		16,914	98.76	−0.30
Informal votes		212	1.24	+0.30
Turnout		17,126	92.28	−1.41
Two-party-preferred result
National	Shane Knuth	8,481	52.71	+4.88
Labor	Christine Scott	7,608	47.29	−4.88
National gain from Labor		Swing	+4.88	

2001 Queensland state election: Charters Towers
Party	Candidate	Votes	%	±%
Labor	Christine Scott	7,575	43.8	+6.1
National	Rob Mitchell	5,984	34.6	−0.4
One Nation	Mark Ree	3,745	21.6	−3.8
Total formal votes		17,304	99.1	
Informal votes		165	0.9	
Turnout		17,469	93.7	
Two-party-preferred result
Labor	Christine Scott	8,138	52.2	+5.4
National	Rob Mitchell	7,460	47.8	−5.4
Labor gain from National		Swing	+5.4	

=== Elections in the 1990s ===
1998 Queensland state election: Charters Towers
Party	Candidate	Votes	%	±%
Labor	Christine Scott	5,758	37.1	−2.5
National	Rob Mitchell	5,454	35.2	−20.0
One Nation	Richard O'Pray	4,066	26.2	+26.2
Shooters	Peter Salisbury	116	0.8	+0.8
Reform	Ben Dyball	114	0.7	+0.7
Total formal votes		15,508	99.2	+0.3
Informal votes		128	0.8	−0.3
Turnout		15,636	93.2	+0.5
Two-party-preferred result
National	Rob Mitchell	7,706	53.7	−4.3
Labor	Christine Scott	6,641	46.3	+4.3
National hold		Swing	−4.3	

1995 Queensland state election: Charters Towers
Party	Candidate	Votes	%	±%
National	Rob Mitchell	8,562	55.2	+11.1
Labor	John White	6,151	39.6	−6.0
Independent	Jo Cronin	513	3.3	−2.2
Democrats	Kevin Paine	290	1.9	+1.9
Total formal votes		15,516	98.9	+0.9
Informal votes		169	1.1	−0.9
Turnout		15,685	92.7	+0.5
Two-party-preferred result
National	Rob Mitchell	8,902	58.0	+7.6
Labor	John White	6,448	42.0	−7.6
National hold		Swing	+7.6	

1992 Queensland state election: Charters Towers
Party	Candidate	Votes	%	±%
Labor	Ken Smyth	7,475	45.7	−3.0
National	Rob Mitchell	7,209	44.1	+0.3
Independent	Jo Cronin	901	5.5	+5.5
Liberal	Joseph Kirk	526	3.2	+1.0
Independent	Harrison Duncan	229	1.4	+1.4
Total formal votes		16,340	98.0	
Informal votes		326	2.0	
Turnout		16,666	92.2	
Two-party-preferred result
National	Rob Mitchell	7,966	50.4	+2.0
Labor	Ken Smyth	7,853	49.6	−2.0
National gain from Labor		Swing	+2.0	

=== Elections in the 1950s ===
1957 Queensland state election: Charters Towers
Party	Candidate	Votes	%	±%
Queensland Labor	Arthur Jones	1,837	43.8	+43.8
Liberal	Kieth Siemon	1,294	30.9	−1.5
Labor	Robert Davies	1,060	25.3	−42.3
Total formal votes		4,191	98.4	−0.6
Informal votes		68	1.6	+0.6
Turnout		4,259	95.4	+0.7
Queensland Labor gain from Labor		Swing	N/A	

1956 Queensland state election: Charters Towers
Party	Candidate	Votes	%	±%
Labor	Arthur Jones	2,766	67.6	−32.4
Liberal	Jan Karlik	1,329	32.4	+32.4
Total formal votes		4,095	99.0	
Informal votes		40	1.0	
Turnout		4,135	94.7	
Labor hold		Swing	N/A	

1953 Queensland state election: Charters Towers
Party	Candidate	Votes	%	±%
Labor	Arthur Jones	unopposed		
Labor hold		Swing		

1950 Queensland state election: Charters Towers
Party	Candidate	Votes	%	±%
Labor	Arthur Jones	2,675	59.2	
Liberal	George Ellis	1,643	36.4	
NQ Labor	Victor Hay	201	4.4	
Total formal votes		4,519	97.3	
Informal votes		124	2.7	
Turnout		4,643	96.1	
Labor hold		Swing		

=== Elections in the 1940s ===
1947 Queensland state election: Charters Towers
Party	Candidate	Votes	%	±%
Labor	Arthur Jones	3,947	63.2	−4.3
Country	Reg Smith	1,459	23.3	+23.3
Independent	George Carbis	843	13.5	+13.5
Total formal votes		6,249	99.1	+0.9
Informal votes		55	0.9	−0.9
Turnout		6,304	91.0	+9.2
Labor hold		Swing	N/A	

1944 Queensland state election: Charters Towers
Party	Candidate	Votes	%	±%
Labor	Arthur Jones	4,241	67.5	+4.3
Independent Labor	Syd Williams	2,344	32.5	−4.3
Total formal votes		6,285	98.2	−0.4
Informal votes		115	1.8	+0.4
Turnout		6,400	81.8	−1.1
Labor hold		Swing	+4.3	

1941 Queensland state election: Charters Towers
Party	Candidate	Votes	%	±%
Labor	Arthur Jones	4,023	63.2	−36.8
Protestant Labour	Syd Williams	2,344	36.8	+36.8
Total formal votes		6,367	98.6	
Informal votes		89	1.4	
Turnout		6,456	82.9	
Labor hold		Swing	N/A	

=== Elections in the 1930s ===
1938 Queensland state election: Charters Towers
Party	Candidate	Votes	%	±%
Labor	William Wellington	unopposed		
Labor hold		Swing		

1935 Queensland state election: Charters Towers
Party	Candidate	Votes	%	±%
Labor	William Wellington	4,443	64.5	
Independent	Frederick Thornleigh	2,020	29.3	
Independent	Alexander Hunter	425	6.2	
Total formal votes		6,888	99.0	
Informal votes		70	1.0	
Turnout		6,958	90.7	
Labor hold		Swing		

- Preferences were not distributed.

1932 Queensland state election: Charters Towers
Party	Candidate	Votes	%	±%
Labor	William Wellington	4,580	63.6	
CPNP	Herbert Poole	2,621	36.4	
Total formal votes		7,201	98.9	
Informal votes		81	1.1	
Turnout		7,282	91.9	
Labor hold		Swing		

=== Elections in the 1920s ===
1929 Queensland state election: Charters Towers
Party	Candidate	Votes	%	±%
Labor	William Wellington	1,976	54.0	−8.3
CPNP	Herbert Poole	1,682	46.0	+8.3
Total formal votes		3,658	98.9	+0.1
Informal votes		40	1.1	−0.1
Turnout		3,698	85.6	−3.0
Labor hold		Swing	−8.3	

1926 Queensland state election: Charters Towers
Party	Candidate	Votes	%	±%
Labor	William Wellington	2,251	62.3	+0.6
CPNP	William Clark	1,365	37.7	−0.6
Total formal votes		3,616	98.8	−0.1
Informal votes		42	1.2	+0.1
Turnout		3,658	88.6	+2.9
Labor hold		Swing	+0.6	

1923 Queensland state election: Charters Towers
Party	Candidate	Votes	%	±%
Labor	William Wellington	2,487	61.7	+7.0
United	Frank Wood	1,545	38.3	+38.3
Total formal votes		4,032	98.9	−0.6
Informal votes		44	1.1	+0.6
Turnout		4,076	85.7	+8.4
Labor hold		Swing	+7.0	

1920 Queensland state election: Charters Towers
Party	Candidate	Votes	%	±%
Labor	William Wellington	1,392	54.7	−2.0
Northern Country	David Guthrie	1,152	45.3	+45.3
Total formal votes		2,544	99.5	+1.7
Informal votes		13	0.5	−1.7
Turnout		2,557	77.3	−2.1
Labor hold		Swing	−2.0	

=== Elections in the 1910s ===
1918 Queensland state election: Charters Towers
Party	Candidate	Votes	%	±%
Labor	William Wellington	1,583	56.7	−1.6
National	Robert Williams	1,209	43.3	+1.6
Total formal votes		2,792	97.8	+0.9
Informal votes		64	2.2	−0.9
Turnout		2,856	79.4	−10.9
Labor hold		Swing	−1.6	

1915 Queensland state election: Charters Towers
Party	Candidate	Votes	%	±%
Labor	William Wellington	1,663	58.3	+11.6
Liberal	Robert Williams	1,192	41.7	−11.6
Total formal votes		2,855	96.9	−1.7
Informal votes		90	3.1	+1.7
Turnout		2,945	90.3	+7.4
Labor gain from Liberal		Swing	+11.6	

1912 Queensland state election: Charters Towers
Party	Candidate	Votes	%	±%
Liberal	Robert Williams	1,569	53.3	
Labor	John Mullan	1,374	46.7	
Total formal votes		2,943	98.6	
Informal votes		42	1.4	
Turnout		2,985	82.9	
Liberal gain from Labor		Swing		
