= Members of the Queensland Legislative Assembly, 1904–1907 =

This is a list of members of the 15th Legislative Assembly of Queensland from 1904 to 1907, as elected at the 1904 state election held on 27 August 1904.

At the start of the period, the state was governed by a coalition of a Liberal group led by Arthur Morgan, and the Labour Party led by William Kidston, while the Conservatives led by former Premier Robert Philp sat in opposition. In 1906, Morgan left to become president of the Queensland Legislative Council, replacing Hugh Nelson who had died on 1 January, and Kidston became Premier. By March 1907, a major realignment had taken place — Kidston had split away to form his own party, the "Kidstonites", taking the ministry, numerous MPs and the coalition with him. By the 1907 state election, the parliamentary parties were as follows:

- Kidstonites, led by William Kidston, consisting of Liberals and former Labour members.
- Labour Party, led by David Bowman.
- Philp Party (Conservative), led by Robert Philp.

| Name | Party (pre-1907) | Party (post-1907) | Electorate | Term in office |
|---|---|---|---|---|
| Peter Airey | Labour | Kidston | Flinders | 1901–1907; 1908–1909 |
| George Barber | Labour | Labour | Bundaberg | 1901–1935 |
| Walter Barnes | Conservative | Conservative | Bulimba | 1901–1915; 1918–1933 |
| Adolphus Barton | Liberal | Kidston | Carnarvon | 1904–1907 |
| Joshua Thomas Bell | Liberal | Kidston | Dalby | 1893–1911 |
| James Blair | Liberal | Kidston | Ipswich | 1902–1915 |
| David Bowman | Labour | Labour | Fortitude Valley | 1899–1902; 1904–1916 |
| Thomas Bouchard | Liberal | Conservative | South Brisbane | 1904–1908; 1909–1915 |
| Thomas Bridges | Liberal | Kidston | Nundah | 1896–1907; 1909–1918 |
| William Browne^{[1]} | Labour | N/A | Croydon | 1893–1904 |
| John Burrows | Labour | Labour | Charters Towers | 1901–1907 |
| John Cameron | Conservative | Conservative | Brisbane North | 1893–1896; 1901–1908 |
| John Dunmore Campbell | Conservative | Conservative | Moreton | 1899–1909 |
| Arthur Cooper^{[4]} | Liberal | N/A | Mitchell | 1902–1905 |
| Henri Cowap | Labour | Kidston | Fitzroy | 1902–1909 |
| Alfred Cowley | Conservative | Conservative | Herbert | 1888–1907 |
| James Cribb | Conservative | Conservative | Bundamba | 1893–1896; 1899–1915 |
| Digby Denham | Liberal | Conservative | Oxley | 1902–1915 |
| Thomas Dibley | Labour | Kidston | Woolloongabba | 1896–1907 |
| John Dunsford^{[6]} | Labour | N/A | Charters Towers | 1893–1905 |
| John Fogarty^{[2]} | Liberal | N/A | Drayton & Toowoomba | 1893–1904 |
| Edward Barrow Forrest | Conservative | Conservative | Brisbane North | 1899–1912 |
| James Forsythe | Conservative | Conservative | Carpentaria | 1899–1907; 1909–1918 |
| George Fox | Conservative | Conservative | Normanby | 1877–1878; 1901–1914 |
| Albert Fudge | Labour | Labour | Mackay | 1904–1907 |
| Kenneth Grant | Labour | Kidston | Rockhampton | 1902–1915 |
| Francis Grayson | Liberal | Kidston | Cunningham | 1904–1920 |
| William Hamilton | Labour | Labour | Gregory | 1899–1915 |
| Patrick Hanran | Conservative | Conservative | Townsville | 1899–1909 |
| Herbert Hardacre | Labour | Labour | Leichhardt | 1893–1919 |
| John Hargreaves^{[8]} | Liberal | N/A | Cook | 1904–1907 |
| Arthur Hawthorn | Liberal | Kidston | Enoggera | 1902–1911 |
| Robert Herbertson | Liberal | Kidston | Port Curtis | 1904–1909 |
| Robert Hodge^{[3]} | Liberal | N/A | Rosewood | 1902–1904; 1909–1920 |
| George Jackson | Labour | Kidston | Kennedy | 1893–1909 |
| Charles Moffatt Jenkinson | Independent | Conservative | Fassifern | 1898–1902; 1903–1909 |
| Alfred Jones | Labour | Labour | Burnett | 1904–1909, 1915–1917, 1922–1932 |
| Francis Kenna | Labour | Kidston | Bowen | 1902–1909 |
| Denis Keogh^{[3]} | Labour | Conservative | Rosewood | 1896–1902; 1904–1911 |
| George Kerr | Labour | Kidston | Barcoo | 1893–1909 |
| William Kidston | Labour | Kidston | Rockhampton | 1896–1911 |
| Edward Land | Labour | Labour | Balonne | 1904–1927 |
| John Leahy | Conservative | Conservative | Bulloo | 1893–1909 |
| Patrick Leahy | Conservative | Conservative | Warrego | 1902–1908 |
| Vincent Lesina | Labour | Labour | Clermont | 1899–1912 |
| George Lindley | Liberal | Kidston | Wide Bay | 1902–1907 |
| Edward Macartney | Conservative | Conservative | Toowong | 1900–1908; 1909–1920 |
| Frank McDonnell | Labour | Labour | Fortitude Valley | 1896–1907 |
| Donald MacKintosh | Liberal | Kidston | Cambooya | 1899–1915 |
| John Mann | Labour | Kidston | Cairns | 1904–1912 |
| George Martin^{[5]} | Labour | N/A | Burrum | 1902–1905 |
| William Maxwell | Labour | Kidston | Burke | 1899–1909 |
| William Mitchell | Labour | Labour | Maryborough | 1904–1909 |
| Arthur Morgan^{[7]} | Liberal | N/A | Warwick | 1887–1896; 1898–1906 |
| Daniel Mulcahy | Labour | Labour | Gympie | 1901–1912 |
| William Murphy^{[1]} | Labour | Kidston | Croydon | 1904–1907; 1908–1918 |
| Charles Nielson | Labour | Kidston | Musgrave | 1904–1907 |
| John Norman | Labour | Kidston | Maryborough | 1902–1907 |
| John O'Brien | Labour | Labour | Aubigny | 1904–1907 |
| Michael O'Keeffe | Liberal | Kidston | Lockyer | 1904–1907 |
| Thomas O'Sullivan^{[7]} | Liberal | Kidston | Warwick | 1906–1908 |
| Walter Paget | Conservative | Conservative | Mackay | 1901–1915 |
| William Paull^{[6]} | Independent | Conservative | Charters Towers | 1905–1908 |
| John Payne^{[4]} | Labour | Labour | Mitchell | 1905–1928 |
| Andrew Lang Petrie | Conservative | Conservative | Toombul | 1893–1926 |
| Robert Philp | Conservative | Conservative | Townsville | 1886–1915 |
| Thomas Plunkett | Liberal | Kidston | Albert | 1888–1896; 1899–1908 |
| Colin Rankin^{[5]} | Independent | Kidston | Burrum | 1905–1918 |
| Carl Reinhold | Labour | Labour | South Brisbane | 1904–1907 |
| George Ryland | Labour | Labour | Gympie | 1899–1912 |
| William Ryott Maughan | Labour | Labour | Ipswich | 1898–1899; 1904–1912 |
| Thomas Scott | Labour | Kidston | Murilla | 1904–1907 |
| Henry Plantagenet Somerset | Liberal | Conservative | Stanley | 1904–1920 |
| Edward Smart^{[2]} | Labour | N/A | Drayton & Toowoomba | 1904–1907 |
| Thomas Spencer | Liberal | Kidston | Maranoa | 1904–1907; 1919–1920 |
| James Stodart | Conservative | Conservative | Logan | 1896–1918 |
| James Tolmie | Liberal | Conservative | Drayton & Toowoomba | 1901–1907; 1909–1918 |
| Henry Turner | Labour | Kidston | North Rockhampton | 1901, 1902–1907 |
| Michael Woods | Labour | Kidston | Woothakata | 1902–1909 |

== See also ==
- 1904 Queensland state election
- Morgan Ministry (Liberal-Labour) (1903–1906)
- First Kidston Ministry (Labour-Liberal / Kidston) (1906–1907)

== Notes ==
^{1} On 12 April 1904, William Browne, the Labour member for Croydon, died. At the resulting by-election on 21 May 1904, Labour candidate William Murphy was elected.
^{2} On 9 September 1904, John Fogarty, the Liberal member for Drayton & Toowoomba, died. At the resulting by-election on 1 October 1904, Labour candidate Edward Smart was elected.
^{3} At the 1904 election, the result went to preferences and Liberal candidate Robert Hodge and Labour candidate Denis Keogh tied, with the returning officer declaring Hodge elected with his casting vote. A petition was lodged against Hodge's return and on 12 December 1904, the Elections Tribunal unseated Hodge and Keogh was duly sworn in.
^{4} On 14 April 1905, Arthur Cooper, the Liberal member for Mitchell, resigned. Labour candidate John Payne won the resulting by-election on 13 May 1905.
^{5} On 14 May 1905, George Martin, the Labour member for Burrum, died. Independent candidate Colin Rankin won the resulting by-election on 17 June 1905.
^{6} On 15 September 1905, John Dunsford, one of the Labour members for Charters Towers, died. Independent candidate William Paull won the resulting by-election on 7 October 1905.
^{7} On 19 January 1906, Arthur Morgan^{[7]}, the Premier of Queensland and Liberal member for Warwick, was appointed to the Queensland Legislative Council to fill the vacancy caused by the death of the President, Sir Hugh Nelson. Liberal candidate Thomas O'Sullivan won the resulting by-election on 10 February 1906.
^{8} On 19 January 1907, John Hargreaves, the Liberal member for Cook, died. No by-election was held due to the proximity of the 1907 state election.

== Bibliography ==
- Waterson, Duncan Bruce: Biographical Register of the Queensland Parliament 1860–1929 (second edition), Sydney 2001.
- Hughes, Colin A.; Graham, B. D. (1976). Voting for the Queensland Legislative Assembly, 1890-1964. Canberra: Australian National University. ISBN 0-7081-0301-4.
- Hughes, Colin A.; Graham, B. D. (1968). A handbook of Australian government and politics, 1890-1964. Canberra: Australian National University. ISBN 0-7081-0270-0.
- Bernays, Charles Arrowsmith (1919). Queensland politics during sixty (1859-1919) years. Brisbane: Government Printer.
