= Electoral results for the district of Hill =

Queensland, Australia, district election results

This is a list of electoral results for the electoral district of Hill in Queensland state elections.

== Members for Hill ==
Member	Party	Term
Shane Knuth	Katter's Australian	2017–present

== Election results ==
=== Elections in the 2020s ===
2024 Queensland state election: Hill
Party	Candidate	Votes	%	±%
Katter's Australian	Shane Knuth	15,075	43.61	−9.01
Liberal National	Cameron McCollum	8,734	25.27	+8.32
Labor	Michael Hodgkin	5,250	15.19	−4.51
One Nation	Brenda Turner	2,375	6.87	+6.87
Greens	Jennifer Cox	2,329	6.74	+0.28
Independent	Matt Lachlan	802	2.32	+2.32
Total formal votes		34,565	96.24	−0.23
Informal votes		1,351	3.76	+0.23
Turnout		35,916	86.12	−1.88
Two-candidate-preferred result
Katter's Australian	Shane Knuth	22,029	63.73	−8.68
Liberal National	Cameron McCollum	12,536	36.27	+8.68
Katter's Australian hold		Swing	−8.68	

2020 Queensland state election: Hill
Party	Candidate	Votes	%	±%
Katter's Australian	Shane Knuth	16,970	52.62	+4.45
Labor	Michael Hodgkins	6,354	19.70	+0.76
Liberal National	Nick Cuda	5,466	16.95	−5.87
Greens	Jennifer Cox	2,083	6.46	−0.10
Informed Medical Options	Tara Garozzo	850	2.64	+2.64
Independent	Peter Campion	414	1.28	+1.28
Independent	Chester Tuxford	114	0.35	−0.42
Total formal votes		32,251	96.47	+0.03
Informal votes		1,179	3.53	−0.03
Turnout		33,430	88.00	+0.10
Notional two-party-preferred count (Note: Estimate two-party preferred count by Antony Green.)
Liberal National	Nick Cuda		59.70	
Labor	Michael Hodgkins		40.30	
Two-candidate-preferred result
Katter's Australian	Shane Knuth	23,398	72.55	+2.80
Labor	Michael Hodgkins	8,853	27.45	+27.45
Katter's Australian hold				

=== Elections in the 2010s ===
2017 Queensland state election: Hill
Party	Candidate	Votes	%	±%
Katter's Australian	Shane Knuth	15,065	48.2	+20.8
Liberal National	Mario Quagliata	7,136	22.8	−14.6
Labor	Diana O'Brien	5,923	18.9	−6.1
Greens	Johanna Kloot	2,052	6.6	+1.6
Independent	Stewart Worth	857	2.7	+2.7
Independent	Chester Tuxford	243	0.8	+0.8
Total formal votes		31,276	96.4	−1.8
Informal votes		1,153	3.6	+1.8
Turnout		32,429	87.9	−2.3
Two-candidate-preferred result
Katter's Australian	Shane Knuth	21,815	69.7	+14.9
Liberal National	Mario Quagliata	9,461	30.3	−14.9
Katter's Australian hold		Swing	+14.9	
