= Electoral results for the district of Dalrymple =

Queensland, Australia, district election results

This is a list of electoral results for the electoral district of Dalrymple in Queensland state elections.

== Members for Dalrymple ==
Member	Party	Term
Shane Knuth	Liberal National	2009–2011
Shane Knuth	Katter's Australian Party	2011–2017

== Election results ==
=== Elections in the 2010s ===
2015 Queensland state election: Dalrymple
Party	Candidate	Votes	%	±%
Katter's Australian	Shane Knuth	11,127	41.59	−12.13
Liberal National	Liz Schmidt	8,004	29.92	+0.81
Labor	Leanne Kettleton	6,489	24.26	+13.17
Greens	Valerie Weier	1,131	4.23	−0.50
Total formal votes		26,751	98.31	−0.22
Informal votes		459	1.69	+0.22
Turnout		27,210	90.11	−0.36
Two-candidate-preferred result
Katter's Australian	Shane Knuth	15,987	65.10	−0.12
Liberal National	Liz Schmidt	8,571	34.90	+0.12
Katter's Australian hold		Swing	−0.12	

2012 Queensland state election: Dalrymple
Party	Candidate	Votes	%	±%
Katter's Australian	Shane Knuth	13,982	53.73	+53.73
Liberal National	Liz Schmidt	7,576	29.11	−12.31
Labor	Benjamin Gertz	2,886	11.09	−11.06
Greens	Jess Jones	1,230	4.73	+1.57
Independent	Jason Briskey	177	0.68	+0.68
Independent	Christopher Williamson	172	0.66	+0.66
Total formal votes		26,023	98.53	−0.26
Informal votes		388	1.47	+0.26
Turnout		26,411	90.47	−0.89
Two-candidate-preferred result
Katter's Australian	Shane Knuth	15,126	65.22	+65.22
Liberal National	Liz Schmidt	8,067	34.78	−20.40
Katter's Australian gain from Liberal National		Swing	N/A	

=== Elections in the 2000s ===
2009 Queensland state election: Dalrymple
Party	Candidate	Votes	%	±%
Liberal National	Shane Knuth	10,597	41.4	+6.5
One Nation	Rosa Lee Long	8,178	32.0	−0.5
Labor	Jason Briskey	5,668	22.2	−6.7
Greens	Glenn Martin	809	3.2	+0.8
Independent	Adrienne Freeman	248	1.0	+1.0
Independent	Harrison Duncan	87	0.3	+0.3
Total formal votes		25.587	98.7	
Informal votes		314	1.3	
Turnout		25,901	91.4	
Two-candidate-preferred result
Liberal National	Shane Knuth	11,517	55.2	−2.5
One Nation	Rosa Lee Long	9,355	44.8	+44.8
Liberal National hold		Swing	−2.5	
