= Electoral district of Croydon =

Electoral district of Croydon may refer to:

- Electoral district of Croydon (South Australia), an electorate of the South Australian House of Assembly
- Electoral district of Croydon (Victoria), an electorate of the Victorian Legislative Assembly
- Electoral district of Croydon (New South Wales), a former electorate of the New South Wales Legislative Assembly
- Electoral district of Croydon (Queensland), a former electorate of the Queensland Legislative Assembly
- Croydon (UK Parliament constituency), a former constituency of the House of Commons of the United Kingdom
