= John Burrows (politician) =

Australian politician

Member of the Queensland Legislative Assembly for Charters Towers
- In office 6 July 1901 – 18 May 1907 Serving with John Dunsford, William Paull
- Preceded by: Anderson Dawson
- Succeeded by: Joe Millican

Personal details
- Born: John Burrows; 16 October 1864 Clunes, Victoria, Australia
- Died: 3 February 1925 (aged 60) Brisbane, Queensland, Australia
- Resting place: Lutwyche Cemetery
- Party: Labor
- Occupation: Journalist

John Burrows (16 October 1864 – 3 February 1925) was a journalist, and member of the Queensland Legislative Assembly.

== Early days ==
Burrows was born in Clunes, Victoria, to parents Nicholas Burrows and his wife Elizabeth Jane (née Pollard). After attending state school in Clunes, he moved to Charters Towers in Queensland where he found work as a whipboy in the mines. In 1888 he started as an apprentice printer moving on to be a journalist and eventually joint proprietor of The Eagle, a radical newspaper, with Anderson Dawson. From 1907 until 1913 he was the editor of the Trinity Times in Cairns and then The Cairns Times from 1913. He finished his working career as a Court shorthand writer from 1920 until 1925.

== Political career ==
In 1901, standing for the Labour Party, Burrows won the seat of Charters Towers, holding it for six years until he was defeated in 1907.

== Personal life ==
A member of the Masons, Burrows died in 1925 and was buried in Lutwyche Cemetery.

Parliament of Queensland
Preceded by Anderson Dawson	Member for Charters Towers; 1901–1907; Served alongside: John Dunsford, William Paull	Succeeded by Joe Millican
