= Vince Creagh =

Australian politician

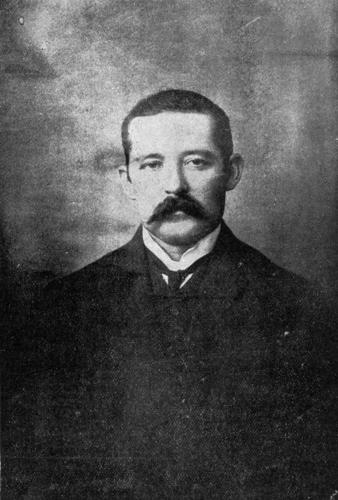

Member of the Queensland Legislative Assembly for Croydon
- In office 18 May 1907 – 5 February 1908
- Preceded by: William Murphy
- Succeeded by: William Murphy

Personal details
- Born: Cornelius Vincent Creagh; 2 July 1876 Brisbane, Queensland, Australia
- Died: 14 April 1909 (aged 32) Brisbane, Queensland, Australia
- Resting place: Toowong Cemetery
- Party: Opposition
- Spouse: Theresa Purcell (m.1907 d.1973)
- Occupation: Auctioneer, Publican

Cornelius Vincent "Vince" Creagh (2 July 1876 – 14 April 1909) was an auctioneer and member of the Queensland Legislative Assembly.

== Biography ==
Creagh was born in Brisbane, Queensland, to parents John Creagh and his wife Margaret (née Kelly) and educated school at Brisbane and Croyden State Schools. He worked in Croyden as a clerk and an auctioneer and in 1908 he was the licensee of the Theatre Royal Hotel in Brisbane.

In the 11 Jun 1907 Creagh married Theresa Purcell (died 1973) and together had one son. He died two years later in 1909 and his funeral moved from the Theatre Royal Hotel to the Toowong Cemetery.

== Political career ==
After being Mayor of Croydon four times he won the seat of Croydon in 1907. He was defeated just months later at the 1908 general election. In 1908 he became an alderman in the Brisbane Council.

Parliament of Queensland
Preceded by William Murphy	Member for Croydon; 1907–1908	Succeeded by William Murphy
