= Vernon Winstanley =

Australian politician

The Honourable Vernon Winstanley
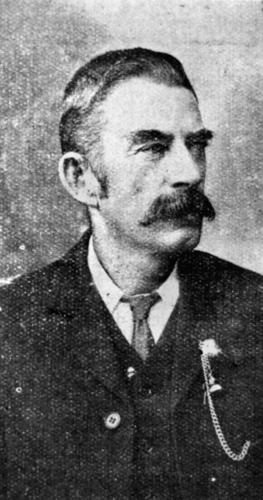
- Vernon Winstanley - December 1909

Member of the Queensland Legislative Assembly for Charters Towers
- In office 5 February 1908 – 27 April 1912 Serving with John Mullan
- Preceded by: Joe Millican
- Succeeded by: Robert Williams

Member of the Queensland Legislative Assembly for Queenton
- In office 27 April 1912 – 11 June 1932
- Preceded by: New seat
- Succeeded by: Seat abolished

Personal details
- Born: Vernon Winstanley; 10 October 1861 Pilley, Yorkshire, England
- Died: 10 January 1938 (aged 73) Brisbane, Queensland, Australia
- Resting place: Balmoral Cemetery
- Party: Labor
- Spouse: Sarah Kate Brookes (m.1890 d.1940)

Vernon Winstanley (10 October 1861 – 10 January 1938) was a member of the Queensland Legislative Assembly.

== Early days ==
Winstanley was born in Pilley, Yorkshire, to parents Thomas Winstanley and his wife Jane (née Wells). He was educated in Pilley and before the age of twelve was working in a coal mine. He came to Australia while still a young man and settled in Charters Towers where he took a leading part in worker's organisations.

== Political career ==
In 1900, Winstanley was a councilor on the Charters Towers Shire Council and in 1908, standing for the Labour Party, he won the seat of Charters Towers in the Queensland Legislative Assembly. He moved to the seat of Queenton in 1912. He held Queenton for the next twenty years until retiring in 1932.

During his time in state politics he was Government Whip from 1915 until 1929.

== Personal life ==
On 5 February 1890, Winstanley married Sarah Kate Brookes and together had one son and six daughters. He died at St Martin's Hospital, Brisbane, in 1938 and his funeral proceeded from the Morningside Methodist Church to the Balmoral Cemetery.

== Street name ==
A number of street names in the Brisbane suburb of Carina Heights are identical to the surnames of former Members of the Queensland Legislative Assembly. One of these is Winstanley Street.

Parliament of Queensland
Preceded by Joe Millican	Member for Charters Towers; 1908–1912; Served alongside: John Mullan	Succeeded by Robert Williams
New seat	Member for Queenton; 1912–1932	Abolished
