= Christine Scott =

Australian politician

Christine Scott JP

Member of the Queensland Legislative Assembly for Charters Towers
- In office 17 February 2001 – 7 February 2004
- Preceded by: Rob Mitchell
- Succeeded by: Shane Knuth

Personal details
- Born: 17 March 1946 (age 80) Broome, Western Australia, Australia
- Party: Labor
- Occupation: Workplace Health and Safety Officer

Christine Margaret Scott (born 17 March 1946) is a former Australian politician. She was a Labor member of the Legislative Assembly of Queensland from 2001 to 2004, representing the seat of Charters Towers.

Scott was born in Broome in Western Australia, and gained a Graduate Diploma in Information Studies, a Bachelor of Teaching (Adult and Further Education) and a Diploma of Education (Adult and Community Education). She was self-employed before her election to parliament, and was also a member of the Premier's Council for Women. In 2001, she won the seat of Charters Towers in that year's Labor landslide, but she was defeated in 2004.

Parliament of Queensland
Preceded by Rob Mitchell	Member for Charters Towers; 2001–2004	Succeeded by Shane Knuth
