= The Eagle (Queensland) =

Front page of the second edition, published 25 February 1893

The Eagle was a weekly newspaper published in Charters Towers, Queensland, Australia. It was published from 1893 to 1906. Editions after 1899 were published as The New Eagle.

== History ==
The Eagle was launched on 18 February 1893 by local labour activists Anderson Dawson and John Dunsford, who would both be elected to the Queensland Legislative Assembly at the May 1893 general election. Dawson served as the newspaper's first editor, having previously written for The Northern Miner and the Australian Republican. He was succeeded as editor in 1896 by Joe Lesina. German-born journalist Stefan von Kotze briefly served as editor in 1899.

Other writers for The Eagle included George Jackson and Lala Fisher.

== Views and editorial stance ==
The Eagle was stridently anti-Chinese and promoted a boycott of Chinese merchants in Charters Towers, even threatening a secondary boycott against Europeans who bought Chinese goods. It claimed "that Chinese hawkers polished apples by spitting on them, that contraction of leprosy was from Chinese goods by a European woman, that Chinese cooks put saliva and sweat in the food, that they used their teeth to prepare bread, and that their goods would spread a pestilence".

During the 1899 federation referendum, The Eagle was the only newspaper in north Queensland opposing federation, a stance shared by other pro-labour papers like The Worker in Brisbane and the Rockhampton Morning Bulletin.

== Digitisation ==
Surviving editions of the newspaper from 1893 to 1906 have been digitised as part of the Australian Newspapers Digitisation Program of the National Library of Australia.
