= William Wellington =

Australian politician

Member of the Queensland Legislative Assembly for Charters Towers
- In office 22 May 1915 – 2 Mar 1939
- Preceded by: Wynn Williams
- Succeeded by: Arthur Jones

Personal details
- Born: William John Wellington; 10 May 1879 Adelong, New South Wales, Australia
- Died: 2 March 1939 (aged 59) Charters Towers, Queensland, Australia
- Resting place: Lynd Highway Cemetery
- Party: Labor
- Spouse: Violet Beatrice Annie Ruthenberg (m.1917 d.1964)
- Occupation: Miner

William John Wellington (10 May 1879 – 2 March 1939) was an Australian miner, trade unionist and politician. He was a member of the Queensland Legislative Assembly from 1915 until his death in 1939, representing the seat of Charters Towers for the Australian Labor Party (ALP).

== Early days ==
Wellington was born in Adelong, New South Wales, to parents Joseph Wellington and his wife Catherine Jane (née Bennetts). He was still an infant when his family moved to Charters Towers and he attended Charters Towers State School. At fourteen years of age he lost a leg in a mining accident and at nineteen he was Secretary of the Amalgamated Workers Association (soon to become the Australian Workers' Union), a position he held for fifteen years.

He was associated with various other miners' organisations in Charters Towers, including vice-president of the Australian Labor Federation and a trustee of The Worker, the Labour-associated Newspaper.

== Political career ==
At the 1912 state election, Wellington, for the Labor Party, won the seat of Charters Towers, beating the sitting Ministerial member Robert Williams. He held the seat until his death in 1939. He rarely spoke in Parliament but when he did it was usually about the mining industry and for improvement of the conditions of workers.

== Personal life ==
On 10 April 1917, Wellington married Violet Beatrice Annie Ruthenberg (died 1964) and together had three sons and three daughters.

Wellington died of pneumonia in Charters Towers on 2 March 1939, aged 59, after a year of poor health. He was buried in the Lynd Highway Cemetery.

Parliament of Queensland
Preceded by Wynn Williams	Member for Charters Towers; 1915–1939	Succeeded by Arthur Jones
