= John Mullan (Australian politician) =

Irish-born Australian politician

The Honourable John Mullan
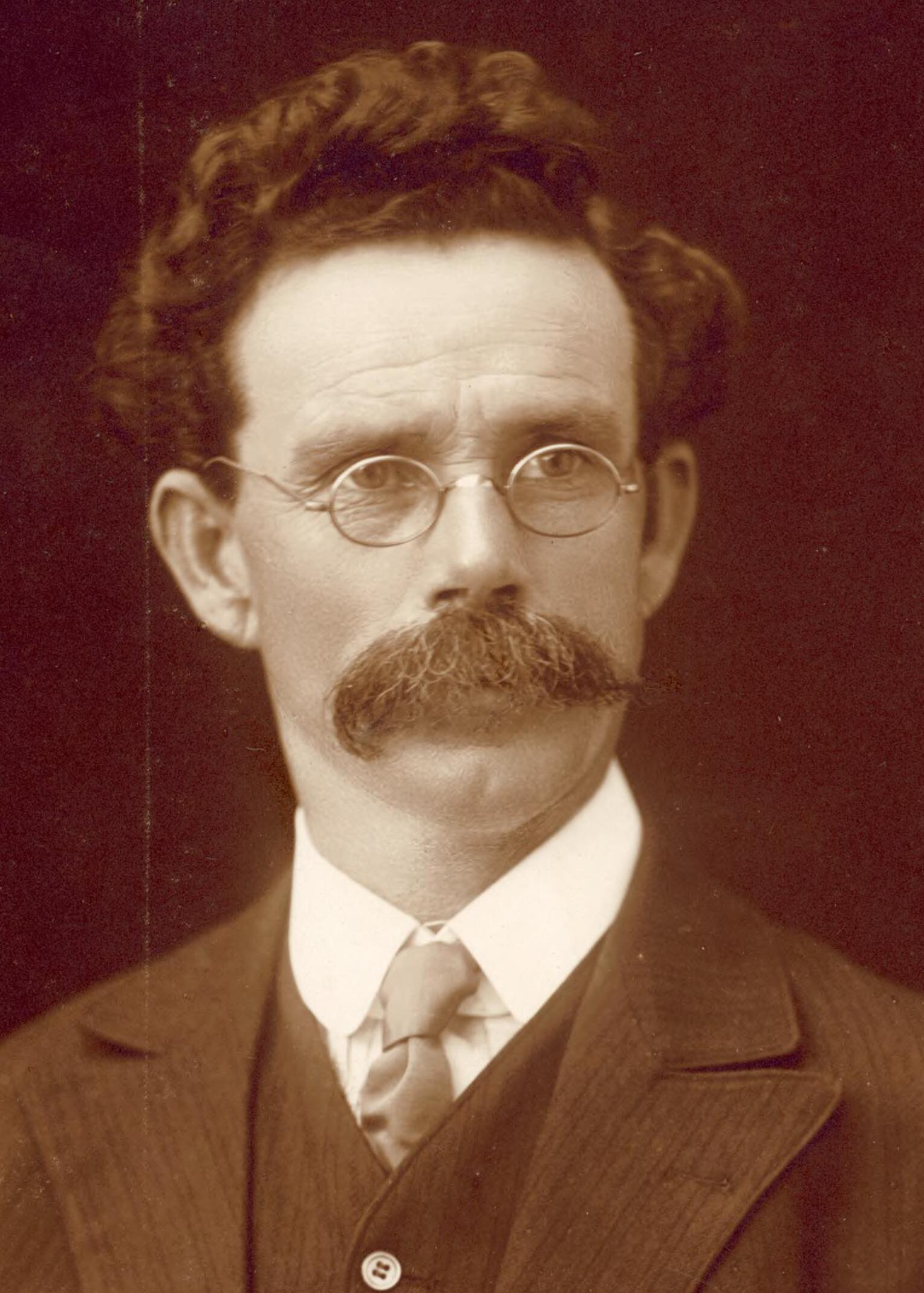

Senator for Queensland
- In office 1 July 1913 – 30 June 1917

Member of the Queensland Legislative Assembly for Charters Towers
- In office 5 February 1908 – 27 April 1912 Serving with Vernon Winstanley
- Preceded by: William Paull
- Succeeded by: Robert Wynn Williams

Member of the Queensland Legislative Assembly for Flinders
- In office 16 March 1918 – 11 June 1932
- Preceded by: John May

Member of the Queensland Legislative Assembly for Carpentaria
- In office 11 June 1932 – 29 March 1941
- Succeeded by: Norm Smith

Personal details
- Born: 8 September 1871 Dublin, Ireland
- Died: 1 October 1941 (aged 70) Brisbane, Queensland
- Resting place: Toowong Cemetery
- Party: Australian Labor Party
- Spouse: Mary Ellen Farrelly
- Occupation: Trade union organiser

John Mullan (8 September 1871 – 1 October 1941) was an Irish-born Australian politician.

== Early life ==
Born in Dublin, where he was educated, he migrated to Australia in 1889, becoming a clerk and railway worker. He was an organiser of the Charters Towers Miners' Union and the Australian Workers' Union.

== Politics ==
In 1908 he was elected to the Legislative Assembly of Queensland as the Labor member for Charters Towers, where he remained until 1912. In 1913 he was elected to the Australian Senate as a Labor Senator for Queensland. He remained in the Senate until his defeat in 1917, after which he returned to the Queensland Legislative Assembly as the member for Flinders in 1918. He served as Attorney-General from 1920 to 1929. In 1932, he changed seats, moving to Carpentaria, and resumed his position as Attorney-General, which he retained until 1940.

== Later life ==
Mullan died in 1941 and was accorded a State funeral which took place from St Stephen's Cathedral to the Toowong Cemetery.

Parliament of Queensland
Preceded by William Paull	Member for Charters Towers; 1908 – 1912; Served alongside: Vernon Winstanley	Succeeded by Robert Wynn Williams
Preceded by John May	Member for Flinders; 1918 – 1932	Abolished
New seat	Member for Carpentaria; 1932 – 1941	Succeeded by Norm Smith
