= Electoral district of Hill =

State electoral district of Queensland, Australia

Hill Queensland—Legislative Assembly
- Map of Hill, 2017
- State: Queensland
- Dates current: 2017–present
- MP: Shane Knuth
- Party: Katter's Australian Party
- Namesake: Dorothy Hill
- Electors: 37,987 (2020)
- Area: 19,752 km^{2} (7,626.3 sq mi)
- Demographic: Rural
- Coordinates: 17.7426°S 145.3189°E
Electorates around Hill:
Cook	Cook	Mulgrave
Cook	Hill	Coral Sea
Traeger	Traeger	Hinchinbrook

Hill is an electoral district of the Legislative Assembly in the Australian state of Queensland. It was created in the 2017 redistribution, and first contested at the Queensland state election the same year. It was named after geologist Dorothy Hill.

Hill is centred on the Atherton Tableland. It consists of the entire Tablelands Region, the southern half of the Cairns Region and a northern portion of the Cassowary Coast, as well as an eastern area of Mareeba Shire. Towns within its boundaries include Atherton, Innisfail, Tully, Babinda and Mission Beach. It was created largely out of the northern portion of the abolished seat of Dalrymple.

From results of the 2015 election, Hill was estimated to be a marginal seat for Katter's Australian Party with a margin of 4.9%. Shane Knuth, the last member for Dalrymple, transferred to Hill and retained it for the KAP with a large swing in his favour.

== Members for Hill ==
Image	Member	Party	Term	Notes
	Shane Knuth	Katter's Australian	25 November 2017 – present	Member for Dalrymple until its abolishment. Incumbent

== Election results ==
2024 Queensland state election: Hill
Party	Candidate	Votes	%	±%
Katter's Australian	Shane Knuth	15,075	43.61	−9.01
Liberal National	Cameron McCollum	8,734	25.27	+8.32
Labor	Michael Hodgkin	5,250	15.19	−4.51
One Nation	Brenda Turner	2,375	6.87	+6.87
Greens	Jennifer Cox	2,329	6.74	+0.28
Independent	Matt Lachlan	802	2.32	+2.32
Total formal votes		34,565	96.24	−0.23
Informal votes		1,351	3.76	+0.23
Turnout		35,916	86.12	−1.88
Two-candidate-preferred result
Katter's Australian	Shane Knuth	22,029	63.73	−8.68
Liberal National	Cameron McCollum	12,536	36.27	+8.68
Katter's Australian hold		Swing	−8.68	

== See also ==
- Electoral districts of Queensland
- Members of the Queensland Legislative Assembly by year
- Category:Members of the Queensland Legislative Assembly by name
