= Lala Fisher =

Australian poet, writer and editor

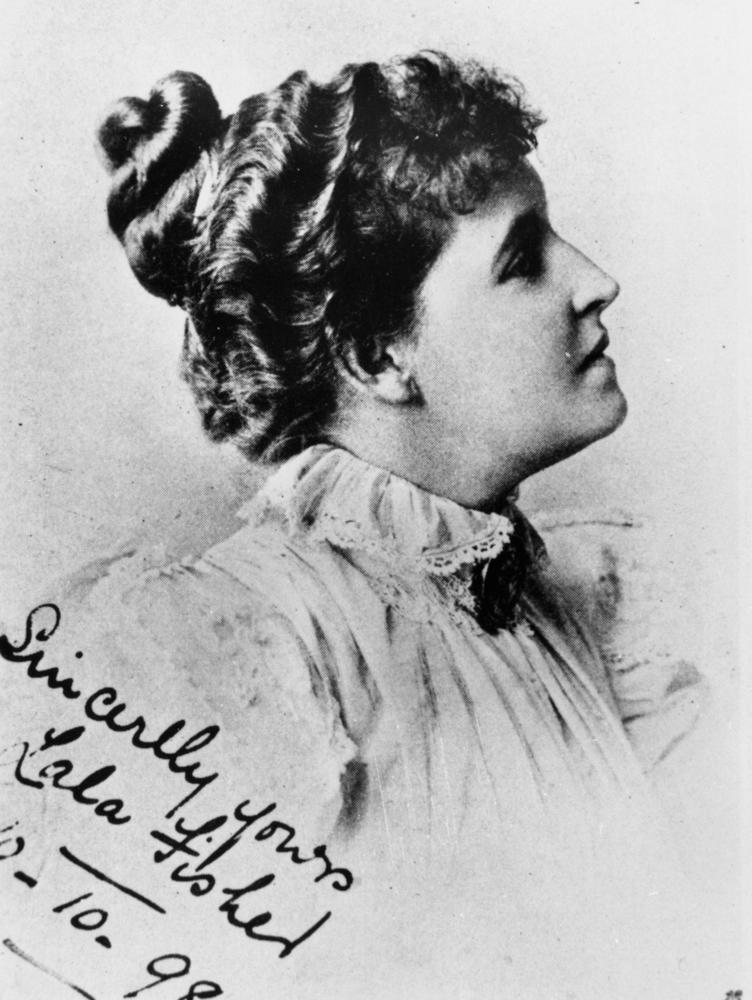
Lala Fisher

Mary Lucy "Lala" Fisher, née Richardson; (27 January 1872 - 27 February 1929) was an Australian poet, writer and editor.

== Early life ==
Lala Fisher was born Mary Lucy Richardson in Rockhampton, Queensland on 27 January 1872 to parents Archibald John Richardson and Lucy Knox D'Arcy and was educated at Rockhampton Girls Grammar School.

Mary Richardson's father Archibald was well known in the area, having served as a technical member on Francis and Alexander Jardine's expedition from Rockhampton to Cape York in 1864. Archibald is also known for discovering sapphires and zircons at Retreat Creek on The Gemfields, west of Rockhampton, in 1878.

Lala was also a niece of William Knox D'Arcy, who was her mother's brother.

Lala Richardson married Francis George Fisher on 7 August 1893 in Rockhampton, and subsequently had two sons.

== Career ==
Lala Fisher began submitting poetry to her local newspapers while living in Yeppoon, Queensland in the 1890s.

In 1897, the Fisher family moved to England and lived at Bembridge on the Isle of Wight. Fisher visited London regularly where she began undertaking activities such as writing, songwriting and lecturing.

Fisher published her first book of verse in 1898 entitled A Twilight Teaching and other poems. The book was met with mixed reviews. A review in Brisbane newspaper The Telegraph described the poetic spirit in the book as being better than the actual literary work contained within it and advised Fisher to select more congenial themes and urged her to put more work into her composition.

A local reviewer who wrote a review of A Twilight Teaching and other poems for local Rockhampton newspapers The Morning Bulletin and The Capricornian opined that Fisher was not a great poet but the poetic feeling in her work was sparkling. The reviewer also held the view that Fisher's longest pieces were not her best and that there was an abruptness about the endings. However, the reviewer said they hoped Fisher's verse would become more staid and finished in years to come.

In 1899, Fisher edited By Creek and Gully - a collection of stories, poems and sketches by twelve Australians that were living in England. A review of By Creek and Gully published in the Sydney Morning Herald described the collection of stories as being of varying value and interest but stated The Last Cruise of John Maudaley by Louis Becke as being the best in the collection.

While living in England, Fisher became a member of the Writer's Club of London and a fellow of the Anthropological Society of London. Fisher also represented Queensland in the International Congress of Women in 1899 and was presented to Queen Victoria at Windsor Castle.

Fisher also became known for her enthusiasm for long distance swimming and once swam from Bembridge to Sea View and back, a distance of about seven miles.

The Fisher family returned to Australia in 1901 where they lived in Rockhampton, Charters Towers and Brisbane. During this time, Fisher wrote for several publications including the New Eagle in Charters Towers and Steele Rudd's Rudd's Magazine.

In 1906, the family moved to Sydney. During tough financial times, Fisher worked various jobs including as a canvasser for Colonial Mutual and as a housekeeper for a Blue Mountains hotel. While living in Sydney, her two sons returned to Rockhampton before they went back to England where they both served in World War I.

Fisher bought Sydney's Theatre Magazine in 1909 where she was the owner/editor until 1918.

Fisher eventually published her second book of verse, Grass Flowering in 1915, which was followed by her third book, Earth Spiritual in 1918.

== Death ==
Fisher's health, including her mental health, began deteriorating from 1920 and she was admitted to Gladesville Mental Hospital in 1923. Fisher died from heart disease on 27 February 1929, and was subsequently privately interred at South Head Cemetery on 28 February 1929.
