= William Murphy (Queensland politician) =

Australian politician (1868–1930)

Member of the Queensland Legislative Assembly for Croydon
- In office 21 May 1904 – 18 May 1907
- Preceded by: Billy Browne
- Succeeded by: Vince Creagh
- In office 5 February 1908 – 27 April 1912
- Preceded by: Vince Creagh
- Succeeded by: Seat abolished

Member of the Queensland Legislative Assembly for Burke
- In office 27 April 1912 – 16 March 1918
- Preceded by: Charles Collins
- Succeeded by: Darby Riordan

Personal details
- Born: William Sidney Murphy; 1868 Mudgee, New South Wales, Australia
- Died: 23 October 1930 (aged 61 or 62) Strathfield, New South Wales, Australia
- Resting place: Rookwood Cemetery
- Party: Independent
- Other political affiliations: Kidstonites, Labour Party
- Occupation: Editor, Newspaper proprietor

William Sidney Murphy (1868 – 23 October 1930) was a newspaper proprietor and member of the Queensland Legislative Assembly.

== Early days ==
Caricature by David Low

Murphy was born at Mudgee, New South Wales, to Edward Murphy and his wife Eliza (née Drane) and was educated in Mudgee and Sydney. By 1890 he was working as an editor for the Croydon Mining News and from 1892 until 1929 he was the proprietor.

== Political career ==
Following the death of Billy Browne in 1904, Murphy was elected to the Queensland Legislative Assembly as the member for Croydon. He lost the seat at the 1907 state election to the Opposition Party's Vince Creagh but at the 1908 state election he defeated Creagh to regain the seat.

Murphy was the member for Croydon until 1912 when the seat was abolished. He subsequently won the seat of Burke and remained its member until he was defeated by Darby Riordan in 1918.

Although he started his political career representing the Labour Party, Murphy joined the Kidstonites in early 1908 for several months and then served the rest of his political career as an independent member of parliament. In 1910 he was a member of the Royal Commission into the health of miners.

== Personal life ==
Murphy died in Strathfield in 1930. His funeral moved from Cross Street, Strathfield, to the Rookwood Cemetery.

Parliament of Queensland
Preceded by Billy Browne	Member for Croydon; 1904–1907	Succeeded by Vince Creagh
Preceded by Vince Creagh	Member for Croydon; 1908–1912	Abolished
Preceded by Charles Collins	Member for Burke; 1912–1918	Succeeded by Darby Riordan
