= Anderson Dawson =

Australian politician (1863–1910)

The Honourable Anderson Dawson
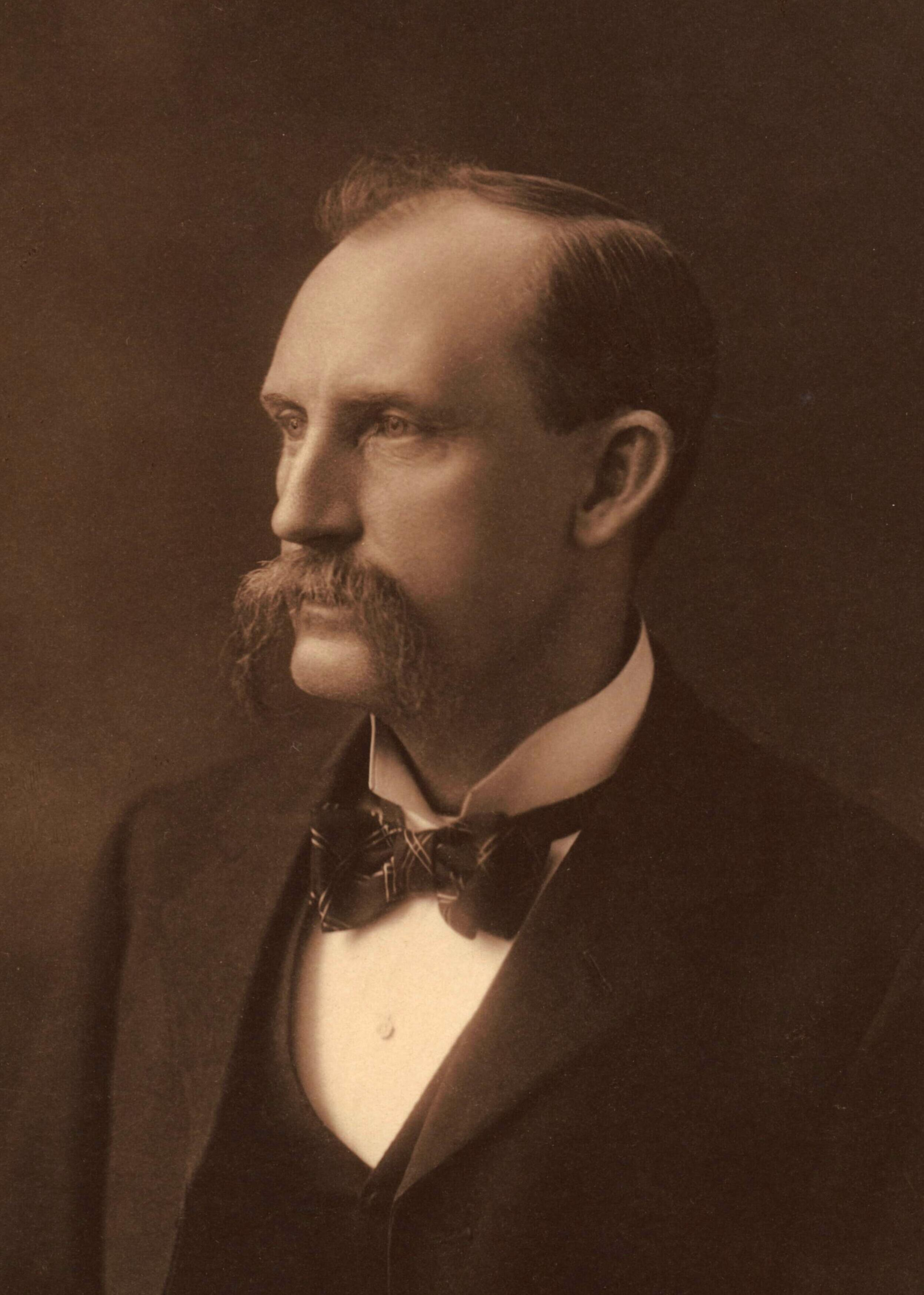

Minister for Defence
- In office 27 April 1904 – 18 August 1904
- Prime Minister: Chris Watson
- Preceded by: Austin Chapman
- Succeeded by: James McCay

Senator for Queensland
- In office 30 March 1901 – 31 December 1906

Premier of Queensland
- In office 1 December 1899 – 7 December 1899
- Governor: Samuel Griffith (acting)
- Preceded by: James Dickson
- Succeeded by: Robert Philp

Leader of the Opposition of Queensland
- In office 12 May 1899 – 1 December 1899
- Preceded by: Thomas Glassey
- Succeeded by: Robert Philp
- In office 7 December 1899 – 16 July 1900
- Preceded by: Robert Philp
- Succeeded by: Billy Browne

Member of the Queensland Legislative Assembly for Charters Towers
- In office 13 May 1893 – 11 June 1901 Serving with John Dunsford
- Preceded by: Robert Sayers
- Succeeded by: John Burrows

Personal details
- Born: Andrew Dawson; 16 July 1863 Rockhampton, Queensland, Australia
- Died: 20 July 1910 (aged 47) Brisbane, Queensland, Australia
- Resting place: Toowong Cemetery
- Party: Labor
- Spouse: Caroline Ryan (m. 1887)
- Occupation: Union organiser, Journalist, Gold miner

Anderson Dawson (born Andrew Dawson; 16 July 1863 – 20 July 1910) was an Australian politician. He was an influential figure in the early years of the Australian Labor Party (ALP), briefly serving as premier of Queensland in 1899 and forming one of the world's first socialist governments. He later served as federal minister for defence in 1904.

Dawson was born in Rockhampton, Queensland. His mother died when he was young and he spent three years in an orphanage after his father abandoned him. Fostered by relatives in Gympie, he left school at the age of twelve and began working on the Charters Towers goldfields. He also spent time in the Kimberley during the Western Australian gold rushes. After returning to Charters Towers, Dawson became president of the local miners' union and active in local labour politics. He also co-founded a local newspaper.

Dawson was elected to the Queensland Legislative Assembly at the 1893 general election, winning the seat of Charters Towers for the Labor Party. He was elected party leader and leader of the opposition in May 1899 and succeeded in passing a no confidence motion in James Dickson's government in December 1899. Dawson succeeded Dickson as premier, but his ministry was quickly defeated on the floor of parliament; he relinquished office after a week. While his government did not pass any legislation it is seen as historically significant in demonstrating that the Labor Party's ability to form government in its own right.

Dawson resigned as leader of the Labor Party in Queensland in August 1900. Following the federation of the Australian colonies, he was elected to the Senate at the inaugural 1901 federal election. He served as defence minister in the Watson government for four months in 1904, the first member of the Labor Party to hold the position. Dawson was defeated for re-election at the 1906 Australian federal election, standing as an independent after factional conflict. He fell into poverty and died of alcoholism in 1910, aged 47.

== Early life ==
Dawson was born on 16 July 1863 in Rockhampton, Queensland. He was the first of two children born to Jane (née Smith) and Anderson Dawson. His parents were both immigrants from Scotland, his mother born in Ayrshire and his father in Lanarkshire.

Dawson's family relocated to Brisbane shortly after he was born, settling in a one-room cottage in Paddington. In 1866 his mother was burned to death when her dress accidentally caught fire at their home. His infant sister died early the following year. Dawson was placed into the Diamantina Orphanage in 1869, aged six, as a result of his father abandoning him. He spent nearly three years in the institution, which housed around 100 boys. Dawson was apparently unaware of his father's subsequent whereabouts and eventual death in 1893 at the Woogaroo Lunatic Asylum. As a teenager he adopted his father's given name "Anderson" as his own.

In 1872, aged nine, Dawson was discharged from the orphanage into the care of his mother's friend. He was later fostered by his aunt Mary Ann Park, who lived with her husband William Park in Gympie with their three sons. He attended the One Mile State School until the age of twelve. After leaving school, Dawson and his foster family moved to the gold mining town of Charters Towers, where his uncle became a publican. He began working as a miner at the age of thirteen, later working as a bullocky and as a subscription collector for The Northern Miner.

In late 1885, Dawson moved to the Kimberley to participate in one of the earliest Western Australian gold rushes. He spent two years in Western Australia, including a period living in Halls Creek, but his prospecting was unsuccessful and he was said to have returned to Charters Towers penniless. In 1899, after Dawson became premier of Queensland, The Worker reported that he had been "mixed up in a supposed nigger massacre" on the Kimberley goldfields, but that it had no been "no massacre at all, only retaliation for cowardly and brutal murder of a mate". Later research has linked this account with a punitive expedition that took place in 1886, in which at least forty Gija people were shot dead with repeating rifles.

== Early political involvement ==
Dawson later was elected first president of the Miners' Union. Dawson was originally attracted to politics by the Irish Home Rule question and in 1890 emerged as a political pamphleteer when he published The Case Stated, "an able plea for the creation of an Australian republic." The pamphlet was freely available in Charters Towers, both a trade unionist and a republican stronghold. Throughout 1890, Dawson was closely involved in the running of the Australasian Republican Association (ARA) and in February 1891 was elected the ARA's second president. Dawson was also president, and later organiser, of the district council of the Australian Labour Federation (ALF). During the Queensland shearers’ strike, he was appointed chairman of the Queensland provincial council of the ALF, and was public in his support of socialism. He took up journalism and for a time was editor of the local radical, The Eagle. He was also elected to the Local Council in Charters Towers.

== Queensland politics ==
Dawson entered politics at the 1893 election, as one of the two Labor candidates for Charters Towers in the Legislative Assembly of Queensland. He won the seat, and retained it at the 1896 and 1899 elections. Dawson was inspired by Marxist economics, and performed speeches to the Social Democratic Federation on Marx and issues surrounding surplus labour.

=== Premier, 1899 ===
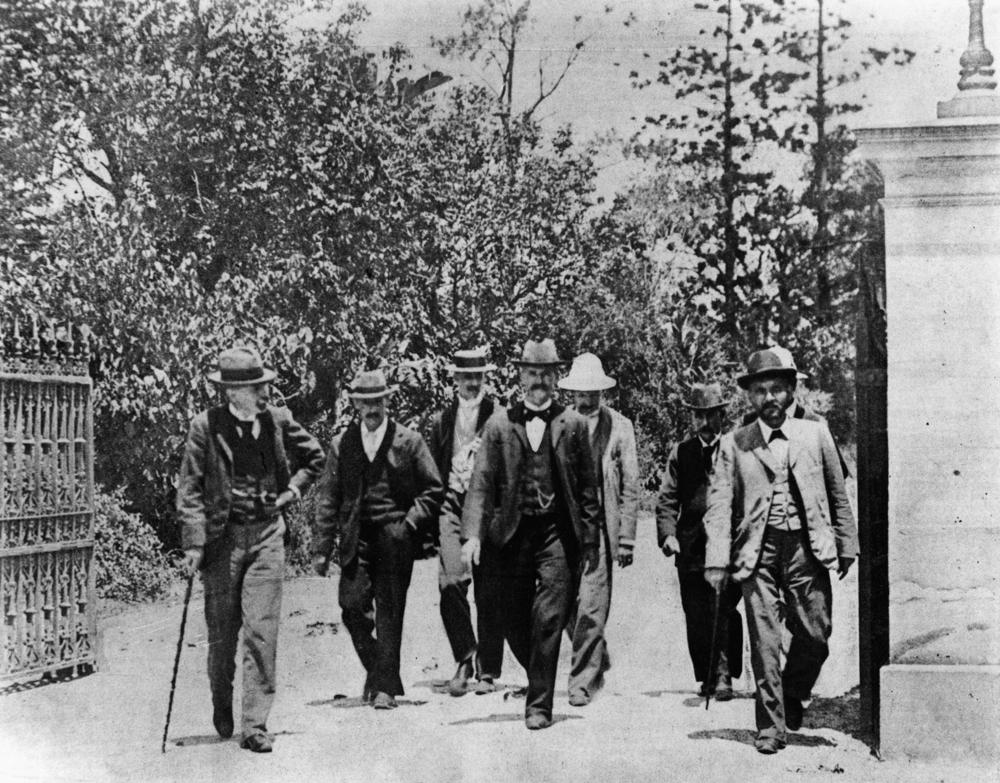
Dawson's ministry leaving Parliament House, Brisbane, after being sworn in

In May 1899, when parliament resumed after the 1899 election, Dawson was elected leader of the parliamentary Labor Party in succession to Thomas Glassey. He became leader of the opposition, a position only formally created for Glassey in August 1898. When the government of James Dickson resigned on 1 December 1899, Dawson formed a ministry. Although it was defeated as soon as the Legislative Assembly next met, it nevertheless became the first socialist or Labour Party government in the world.

This remains one of the shortest ministries of any state government in Australia. In a remarkable coincidence, Vaiben Louis Solomon's contemporaneous ministry in South Australia outdid Dawson by a single day (1–8 December 1899). John Cain and Thomas Hollway, both premiers of Victoria in the 1940s–50s, had shorter ministries. Cain served for four days and Hollway for only 70 hours. The very shortest belongs to George Fuller, who was premier of New South Wales for seven hours on 20 December 1921. These, however, were not Cain, Fuller, or Hollway's only terms as premier; all three exceeded Dawson for total time in the role.

== Federal politics ==
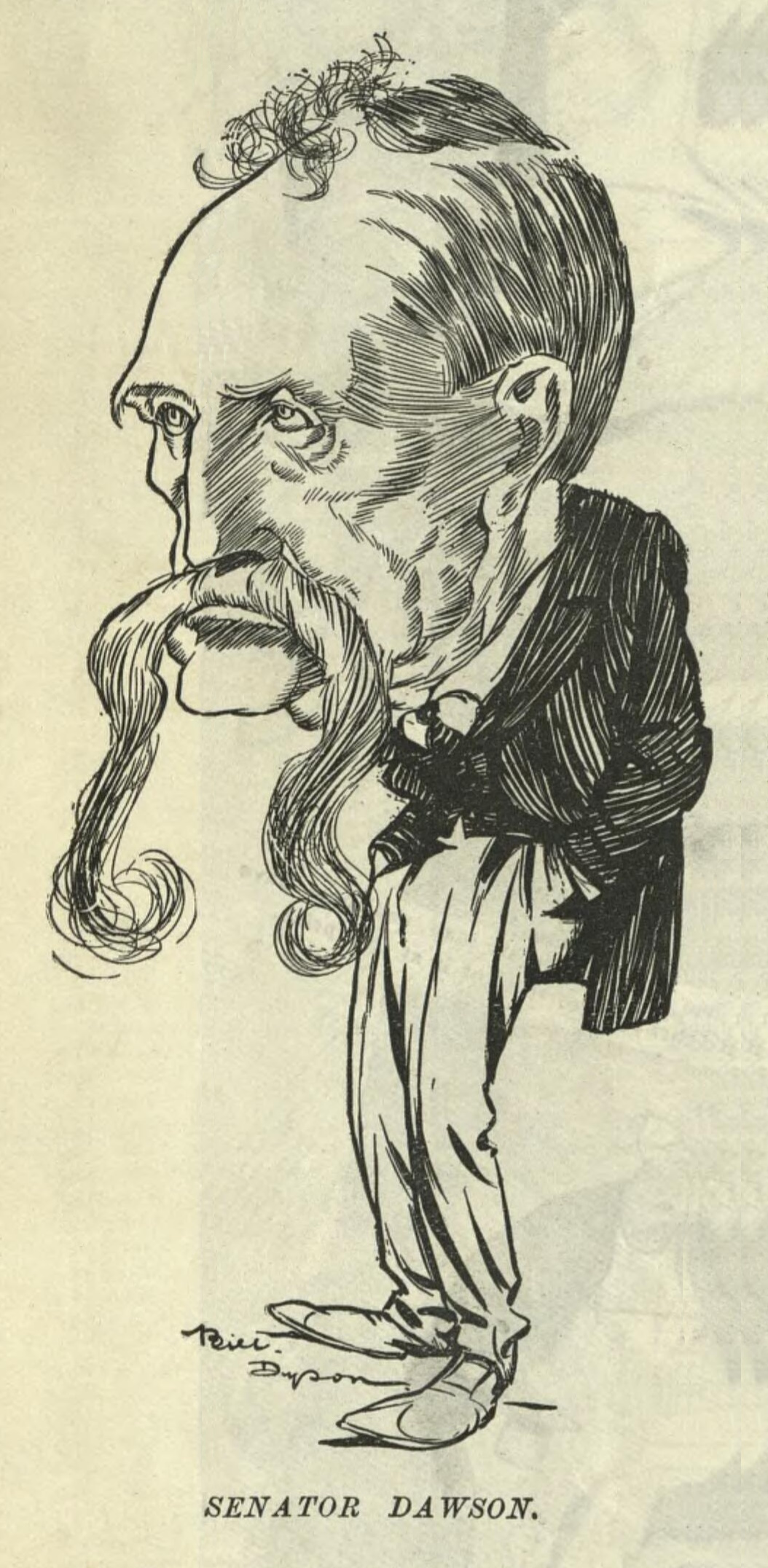
1906 caricature of Dawson by Will Dyson, published in The Bulletin

=== Initial years ===
At the first Federal election for the Senate in 1901, Dawson was returned at the head of the Queensland Labor ticket. While in federal parliament, he was regarded as a good speaker, but struggled with persistent ill health associated with chronic lung trouble from his time as a miner, which worsened after he relocated his family from Queensland to the colder climate of Melbourne. He also struggled with alcoholism, and was absent from parliament for periods, frustrating his colleagues.

=== Defence minister, 1904 ===
In April 1904, when Chris Watson formed the first Federal Labor government, Dawson was given the portfolio of Minister for Defence in light of his prominent status as a former Premier. As Minister for Defence, he clashed with Edward Hutton, the aristocratic English General Officer Commanding the Australian Military Forces, who had resisted being answerable to the executive, and had been viewed as disrespectful by previous defence ministers. Dawson proposed a military restructure which eliminated Hutton's position, which was adopted by his successor after the ousting of the Watson government, resulting in Hutton's resignation and return to England. Dawson reportedly stated that the "most satisfying facet" of his stint as minister had been that he had "pulled down from his pedestal the biggest bounder that had ever commanded the forces in Australia."

=== Remaining term and defeat ===
In May 1906, during a friendly visit of the Imperial Japanese Navy's training squadron to Melbourne, Dawson and other parliamentarians were invited to a reception hosted by Rear-Admiral Shimamura Hayao aboard the Japanese cruiser Hashidate. Dawson published an open letter refusing the invitation, stating he did not trust the Japanese and that it be hypocritical to enjoy their hospitality. He further stated that "the day will dawn when Australia will rue the day it showered so much 'gush' on you" and concluded by asserting that history would prove whether he was right or wrong.

By the time of the 1906 election, Dawson had a poor relationship with the Queensland state executive of the Labor Party, and was initially demoted to the unwinnable fourth position on the Labor Senate ticket. As a result of concerns about the electoral fallout of his dumping, he was reinstated to the winnable third position on the ticket, but resigned as a candidate two months later, citing ill health. He subsequently changed his mind, but the executive refused to reinstate him, so he ran as an independent. That move split the Labor vote, and amidst a generally bad election for Labor in Queensland, the entire ticket lost.

== Personal life ==
=== Marriage and children ===
On 21 December 1887, Dawson married Caroline Ryan (née Quinn) in Charters Towers. She was a widow whose first husband had been 32 years her senior. Their first two children Hanorah (b. 1889) and Ernest (b. 1891) were born in Charters Towers, with Jeanette (b. 1893) and Robert (b. 1895) born in Brisbane.

In 1901, following his election to federal parliament, Dawson and his family relocated to the interim national capital of Melbourne. He purchased Villa Alba, a two-storey residence in Kew, likely using the sale proceeds of his half-share in the Charters Towers Eagle. Dawson came to dislike Melbourne, both as his place of residence and as a potential permanent capital. In a 1903 parliamentary speech he stated that if "the seventh circle of Dante’s Inferno were chosen, I should prefer it to Melbourne".

=== Health issues and final years ===
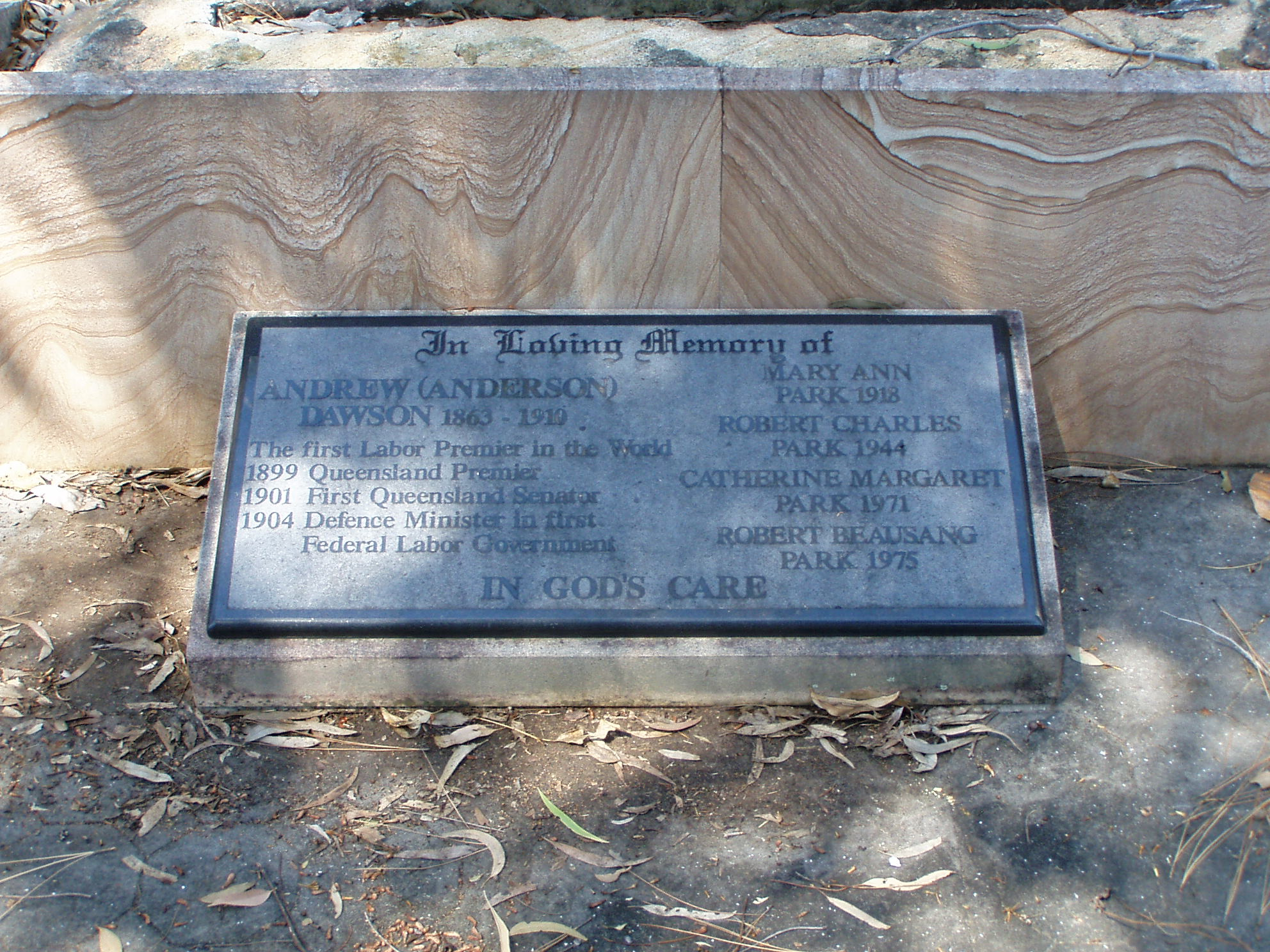
Dawson's headstone at Brisbane's Toowong Cemetery.

Dawson suffered from alcoholism for much of his adult life. According to Fitzgerald (1999), his "ignominious electoral defeat, coupled with his continuing quarrels with the Labor party, accelerated his descent into the ravages of chronic alcoholism". His foster father had also been an alcoholic and drowned in a creek in 1892 while intoxicated. Dawson additionally suffered from a pulmonary condition relating to his work as a miner. His health problems contributed to his resignation as opposition leader in 1900 and his inability to complete his legal studies.

After leaving parliament, Dawson was unable to find work in Melbourne. He became estranged from his family and returned to Brisbane in early 1909. His former Labor colleague William Kidston secured him a position at the Queensland Immigration Depot, where he oversaw the deportation of Kanaka labourers. By 1910 he was living in rented accommodation in East Brisbane.

Dawson was admitted to the Brisbane General Hospital on 6 July 1910 and was expected to recover, but died of the effects of alcoholism on 20 July 1910. His widow and children reportedly did not attend his funeral. He was buried in Toowong Cemetery on 21 July 1910.

== Legacy ==
The Division of Dawson was named in Dawson's honour when the House of Representatives was expanded prior to the 1949 federal election. There was renewed public interest in Dawson and his government in the lead-up to its 100th anniversary in 1999. The Royal Historical Society of Queensland hosted a conference on the government and the University of Queensland Press published a book by Ross Fitzgerald, which was launched by Queensland premier Peter Beattie at Old Government House. Beattie also acknowledged the centenary in a commemorative address to the Queensland Legislative Assembly and held a state cabinet meeting in Charters Towers. An early day motion commemorating the centenary was tabled in the British House of Commons.

Political offices
Preceded by James Dickson	Premier of Queensland; 1899	Succeeded by Robert Philp
Preceded by Austin Chapman	Minister for Defence In The Australian Parliament; 1904	Succeeded by James Whiteside McCay
Preceded by Thomas Glassey	Leader of the Opposition in Queensland; 1899	Succeeded by Robert Philp
Preceded by Robert Philp	Leader of the Opposition in Queensland; 1899–1900	Succeeded by Billy Browne
Parliament of Queensland
Preceded by Robert Sayers	Member for Charters Towers; 1893–1901; Served alongside: John Dunsford	Succeeded by John Burrows
