= Joe Millican =

Australian politician

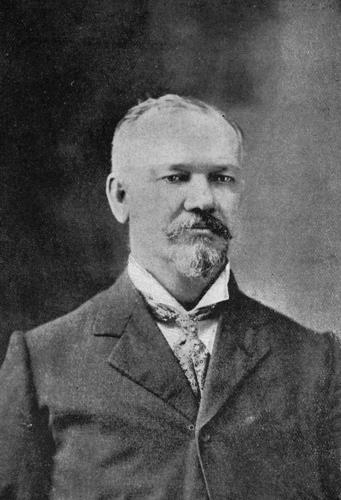
- Joe Millican Chairman of the Charters Towers Water Board 1907

Member of the Queensland Legislative Assembly for Charters Towers
- In office 18 May 1907 – 5 February 1908 Serving with William Paull
- Preceded by: John Burrows
- Succeeded by: Vernon Winstanley

Personal details
- Born: Joe Millican; 25 April 1855 Allendale, Northumberland, England
- Died: 26 May 1934 (aged 79) Sydney, Australia
- Resting place: Rookwood Cemetery
- Party: Opposition
- Spouse: Sarah Hannah Smith (m.1881)
- Occupation: Company director

Joe Millican (25 April 1855 – 10 August 1934) was an Australian politician. He was the Opposition member for Charters Towers in the Legislative Assembly of Queensland from 1907 to 1908.

Millican died in 1934 and is buried at Rookwood Cemetery.

Parliament of Queensland
Preceded by John Burrows	Member for Charters Towers; 1907–1908; Served alongside: William Paull	Succeeded by Vernon Winstanley
