= Robert Sayers =

Australian politician

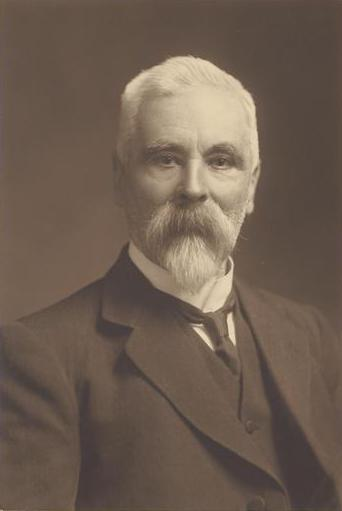

Senator for Queensland
- In office 1 January 1907 – 30 June 1913

Member of the Queensland Legislative Assembly for Charters Towers
- In office 12 May 1888 – 13 May 1893 Serving with Arthur Rutledge
- Succeeded by: Anderson Dawson

Personal details
- Born: 27 January 1845 St Lawrence, Isle of Wight, England
- Died: 12 May 1919 (aged 74) Brisbane, Queensland, Australia
- Resting place: Toowong Cemetery
- Party: Anti-Socialist (1907–09); Liberal (1909–13)
- Occupation: Gold miner

Robert John Sayers (27 January 1845 – 12 May 1919) was an Australian businessman and politician. He was a senator for Queensland from 1907 to 1913, having previously served in the Queensland Legislative Assembly from 1888 to 1893. Prior to entering politics he was a gold miner and investor at Charters Towers.

== Early life ==
Sayers was born on 27 January 1845 in St Lawrence, Isle of Wight, England. He was the son of Emma (née Gover) and James Alexander Sayers. His father was an officer in the Coastguard.

Sayers was educated in Cowes and London. He arrived in Australia in about 1863, joining the gold rush at Crocodile Creek, Queensland. He later mined in a variety of localities around New South Wales and Queensland. He was among the first to arrive at Charters Towers following the discovery of gold in 1872. By investing in packhorses he made a substantial profit from the subsequent Palmer River rush. Sayers invested in a number of gold mines around Charters Towers. He was also a mine manager for a period.

== Politics ==
Sayers in 1889

Sayers was elected to the Queensland Legislative Assembly at the 1888 general election, one of two members representing the newly created seat of Charters Towers. He identified himself as a protectionist and "ardent liberal", supporting the Continuous Ministry. He was defeated at the 1893 election following an increase in the Labor Party vote and also stood unsuccessfully at the 1896 and 1904 elections.

In 1906, he was elected to the Australian Senate as an Anti-Socialist Senator for Queensland, joining the Commonwealth Liberal Party in 1909. He was defeated in 1913.

== Personal life ==
Sayers was unmarried and lived with his sister Clara. He died on 12 May 1919 at his home in Brisbane on Bowen Terrace. He was interred at Toowong Cemetery.

Parliament of Queensland
New seat	Member for Charters Towers; 1888 – 1893; Served alongside: Arthur Rutledge	Succeeded by Anderson Dawson
