= Robert Wynn Williams =

Australian politician

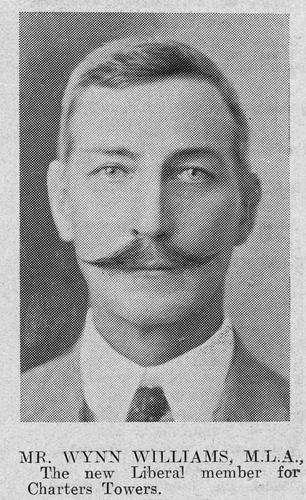
- Robert Wynn Williams in 1912

Member of the Queensland Legislative Assembly for Charters Towers
- In office 27 April 1912 – 22 May 1915
- Preceded by: Vernon Winstanley & John Mullan
- Succeeded by: William Wellington

Personal details
- Born: Robert Godfrey Wynn Williams; 11 September 1864 Auckland, New Zealand
- Died: 8 September 1929 (aged 64) Charters Towers, Queensland, Australia
- Resting place: Lynd Highway Cemetery
- Party: Ministerialist
- Spouse: Lizzie Macpherson (m.1894 d. 1951)
- Relations: Henry Wynn-Williams (uncle); Charles James Watkin Williams (uncle)
- Occupation: Solicitor

Robert Godfrey Wynn Williams (11 September 1864 – 8 September 1929) was a solicitor and member of the Queensland Legislative Assembly.

== Early days ==
Wynn Williams was born on 11 September 1864 in Jermyn Street (now Anzac Avenue), Auckland, New Zealand, to parents Robert Wynne Williams and his wife Jane (née Lloyd). His uncle Henry Wynn-Williams was the first to add "Wynn" to his surname, and his father then added "Wynne" to his surname. It is not clear where this originates from, and it could either refer to the old-English word for 'friend', Welsh for 'fair', or to the Reverend John Wynne who had baptised Sir Charles Williams, his father's oldest surviving brother.

Aged 8, Robert Wynn Williams was sent to London to Christ's Hospital to receive his education. Aged 15, he returned to New Zealand to train in Christchurch under his uncle Henry as a lawyer. After he was admitted to the Supreme Court of New Zealand at age 21, he practised as a lawyer for some time in Auckland before declining health prompted him to move to Ireland. In 1890 he was working as a surveyor in New South Wales before working as a solicitor for Thynne and Macartney in Brisbane in 1892.

He headed to Charters Towers in 1894 to start his own practice, specialising in mining and company law, operating this business up until his death in 1929.

== Political career ==
Wynn Williams, representing the Ministerialists, won the seat of Charters Towers at the 1912 state elections. He held the seat for three years, being defeated in 1915.

== Personal life ==
On 21 April 1894, Wynn Williams married Elizabeth Macpherson (died 1951) in Sydney. He died in Charters Towers in 1929 and was buried in the Lynd Highway Cemetery.

== Notes ==
Parliament of Queensland
Preceded by Vernon Winstanley & John Mullan	Member for Charters Towers; 1912–1915	Succeeded by William Wellington
