= W. H. Browne =

Australian miner and politician (1846–1904)

The Honourable W. H. Browne
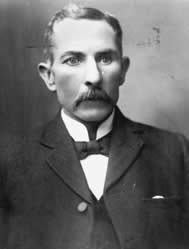

Leader of the Opposition of Queensland
- In office 16 July 1900 – 17 September 1903
- Preceded by: Anderson Dawson
- Succeeded by: Robert Philp

Member of the Queensland Legislative Assembly for Croydon
- In office 13 May 1893 – 12 April 1904
- Preceded by: New seat
- Succeeded by: William Murphy

Personal details
- Born: William Henry Browne; 13 September 1846 Pimlico, London, England
- Died: 12 April 1904 (aged 57) Brisbane, Queensland, Australia
- Resting place: Toowong Cemetery
- Party: Labour Party
- Occupation: Gold miner, Seaman

William Henry Browne (13 September 1846 – 12 April 1904), known as W. H. Browne or Billy Browne, was a gold miner and member of the Queensland Legislative Assembly.

== Biography ==
Browne was born in Pimlico, London, to parents William Henry Browne, a stone-sawyer, and his wife Eliza (née Barton). At age eleven he was at sea with the merchant navy, a position he held for the next nine years.

He landed in Australia in 1866 and commenced gold mining at Araluen, New South Wales before working his trade at Gympie, Herberton and Croydon. It was in Croydon that he lost an eye in an accident in the mines.

Unmarried, he died in office of pneumonia and angina in Brisbane in 1904 and his funeral proceeded from St John's Cathedral to the Toowong Cemetery.

== Political career ==
Browne became president and secretary of the Amalgamated Miners' Association in Croydon, and was an alderman in the same town.

In August 1890 Browne contested a by-election for the seat of Burke in the Queensland Legislative Assembly, but lost to John Hoolan by 24 votes. As secretary of the miner's union, he organised financial support for the shearers in the 1891 Australian shearers' strike.

At the 1893 Queensland colonial elections, Browne, representing the Labour Party, won the new seat of Croydon, holding it till his death in 1904. He was Secretary for Mines & Public Instruction in the world's first socialist government in 1899, and Secretary for Mines & Public Works in 1903–1904. From 1900 until 1903 he was chairman of the parliamentary Labour Party and opposition leader.

Though not a forceful speaker, he was often heard in the house.

Political offices
Preceded by Anderson Dawson	Leader of the Opposition of Queensland; 1900–1903	Succeeded by Robert Philp
Parliament of Queensland
New seat	Member for Croydon; 1893–1904	Succeeded by William Murphy
