= Electoral district of Dalrymple =

Dalrymple Queensland—Legislative Assembly
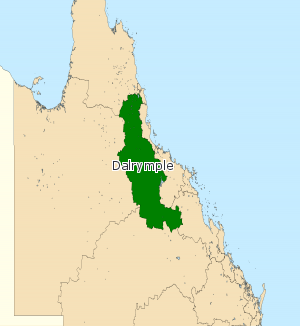
- Dalrymple (2008-2017)
- State: Queensland
- Dates current: 2009–2017
- MP: Several
- Party: Liberal National (once); Katter's Australian (once)
- Namesake: Dalrymple National Park
- Electors: 30,197 (2015)
- Area: 105,337 km^{2} (40,670.8 sq mi)
- Coordinates: 19°52′S 146°17′E

Dalrymple was an electoral district of the Legislative Assembly in the Australian state of Queensland from 2009 to 2017.

== Geography ==
Based in inland northern Queensland, Dalrymple was a north–south elongated electorate, running from the Atherton Tableland west of Cairns at its northern end, down to areas west of Mackay at its southern end. It was based on Charters Towers, and also included Moranbah, Atherton and Herberton.

== History ==
Dalrymple was first created for the 2009 election from parts of the abolished electorates of Charters Towers and Tablelands. Originally proposed by the Electoral Commission of Queensland to be named Macrossan, the name Dalrymple was adopted after further review. The district's first contest pitted two incumbent MPs against each other, with sitting Charters Towers MP Shane Knuth of the Liberal National Party defeating sitting Tablelands MP Rosa Lee Long, of One Nation.

Knuth defected to Katter's Australian Party in 2011. He was handily re-elected in the face of the massive landslide to the LNP at the 2012 state election, besting his replacement as LNP candidate by an almost 2-to-1 two-party-preferred margin, and actually won enough primary votes to retain the seat outright. He was re-elected almost as easily in 2015.

Dalrymple was abolished in the 2017 electoral redistribution. Its more urbanised central section, including Charters Towers, became part of the new electorate of Traeger, its northern section became part of the new electorate of Hill, and its southern section became part of Burdekin. Knuth transferred to Hill.

== Members for Dalrymple ==
| Image | Member | Party | Term | Notes |
|---|---|---|---|---|
| | Shane Knuth | Liberal National | 21 March 2009 – 30 October 2011 | Resigned from the LNP. Moved to electoral district of Hill |
| | Shane Knuth | Katter's Australian | 30 October 2011 – 25 November 2017 | Resigned from the LNP. Moved to electoral district of Hill |
