= The Northern Miner (Queensland) =

Australian newspaper

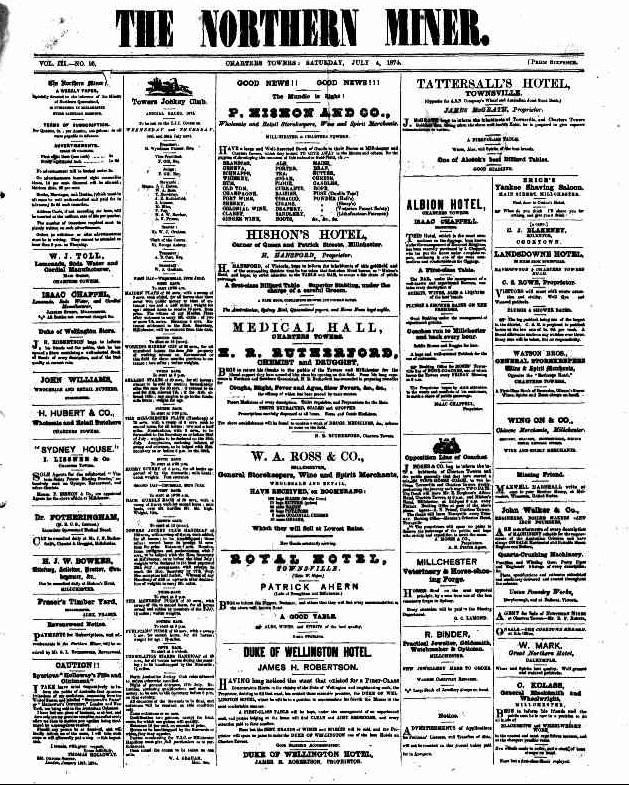
Front page of The Northern Miner, 4 July 1874

The Northern Miner is an online newspaper published in Charters Towers, Queensland, Australia.

== History ==
The Northern Miner was first established in 1872 by James Smith Reid. Reid established the paper only eight months after the discovery of gold in the regional Queensland town Charters Towers.

In 1876 Reid sold the paper to Thadeus O'Kane. As the owner and editor of the Northern Miner, O’Kane devoted himself and the paper to improving the lives of the miners working in Charters Towers.

Of the five newspapers published in the goldfields – which also included The Eagle, The Evening Telegraph and The North Queensland Register – The Northern Miner was the only one to survive the downturn in gold mining.

The paper was published in hard copy – from the same Gill Street address as in 1878 – until June 2020, when News Corp, its then owner, announced that more than 125 newspapers would be closed or become digital only. The paper was subsequently incorporated into the Townsville Bulletin.

== Digitisation by Trove ==
Editions of the newspaper from 1874 to 1954 have been digitised as part of the Australian Newspapers Digitisation Program (Trove) of the National Library of Australia.

== See also ==
- List of newspapers in Australia
- Charters Towers, Queensland
