= Rob Mitchell (Queensland politician) =

Australian politician (born 1948)

Shadow Minister for Mines and Energy
- In office 2 July 1998 – 20 April 1999
- Leader: Rob Borbidge
- Preceded by: Tony McGrady
- Succeeded by: Marc Rowell

Queensland Government Chief Whip
- In office 17 February 1998 – 30 June 1998
- Premier: Rob Borbidge
- Preceded by: Lawrence Springborg
- Succeeded by: Terry Sullivan

Member of the Queensland Legislative Assembly for Charters Towers
- In office 19 September 1992 – 17 February 2001
- Preceded by: New seat
- Succeeded by: Christine Scott

Personal details
- Born: Robert Alan Mitchell; 5 August 1948 (age 77) Aramac, Queensland, Australia
- Party: National Party
- Occupation: Club manager

Robert Alan Mitchell (born 5 August 1948) is a former Australian politician. He was the National Party member for Charters Towers in the Legislative Assembly of Queensland from 1992 to 2001.

== Biography ==
Mitchell was born in Aramac, Queensland. He served on Flinders Shire Council from 1977 to 1982. He was appointed to the Coalition front bench in 1998 as Shadow Minister for Mines and Energy, but he left the ministry in 1999. He was defeated in 2001.

Parliament of Queensland
Preceded by New seat	Member for Charters Towers; 1992–2001	Succeeded by Christine Scott
