= Electoral district of Croydon (Queensland) =

Coordinates: 18.205°S 142.245°E

Croydon Queensland—Legislative Assembly
- State: Queensland
- Dates current: 1893–1912

Croydon was an electoral district of the Legislative Assembly in the Australian state of Queensland from 1893 to 1912.

Based in the remote western part of the state, it was first created for the 1893 colonial election out of the district of Burke when that ceased to be a two-member electorate. The district was abolished for the 1912 state election and divided between the districts of Burke and Flinders.

== Members for Croydon ==
Member	Party	Term
Billy Browne	Labour	1893–1904
William Murphy	Labour	1904–1904
Vince Creagh	Opposition	1907–1908
William Murphy	Ministerialist	1908
William Murphy	Independent Opposition	1908–1912

== See also ==
- Electoral districts of Queensland
- Members of the Queensland Legislative Assembly by year
- Category:Members of the Queensland Legislative Assembly by name
