= John Dunsford =

Australian politician

Member of the Queensland Legislative Assembly for Charters Towers
- In office 13 May 1893 – 15 Sep 1905 Serving with Anderson Dawson, John Burrows
- Preceded by: Arthur Rutledge
- Succeeded by: William Paull

Personal details
- Born: John Henry Dunsford; 3 July 1855 Maldon, Victoria, Australia
- Died: 15 September 1905 (aged 50) Cunnamulla, Queensland, Australia
- Resting place: Cunnamulla Cemetery
- Party: Labour
- Spouse: Maria McDonough (m.1882 d.1945)
- Occupation: Miner

John Henry Dunsford (3 July 1855 – 15 September 1905) was a miner and member of the Queensland Legislative Assembly.

== Early days ==
Dunsford was born in Maldon, Victoria, to parents John Holman Dunsford and his wife Mary (née Harding). and educated at Maldon State School. By 1873 he was in Queensland and getting pastoral experience and in 1876 he headed overseas to work as a goldminer in Madagascar and the South African Republic.

By 1878 he was back in Australia and working in Charters Towers as a stationer and finally in 1892 he went back to mining for a year, speculating on the goldfields in the area.

== Political career ==
After spending time as a councilor at Charters Towers, Dunsford, standing for the Labour Party, won the seat of Charters Towers in the Queensland Legislative Assembly. He held the seat for over twelve years until his death in 1905.

== Personal life ==
On the 9 Mar 1882 Dunsford married Maria McDonough and together had five children. He died in office in 1905 and was buried in the Cunnamulla Cemetery.

Parliament of Queensland
Preceded by Arthur Rutledge	Member for Charters Towers; 1893–1905; Served alongside: Anderson Dawson, John Burrows	Succeeded by William Paull
