= William Paull (politician) =

Australian politician

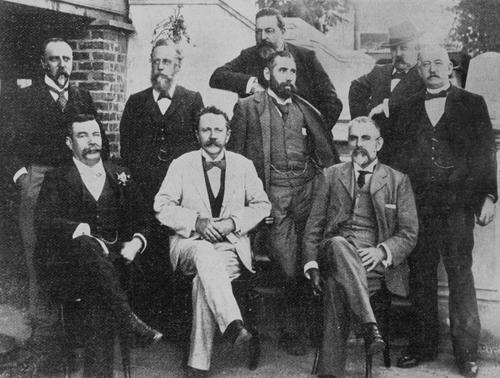
- Members of the Townsville Harbour Board 1901 - William Paull is at the centre, rear row.

Member of the Queensland Legislative Assembly for Charters Towers
- In office 7 October 1905 – 5 February 1908 Serving with John Burrows, Joe Millican
- Preceded by: John Dunsford
- Succeeded by: John Mullan

Personal details
- Born: William James Paull; March 1846 Cran Crae, Cornwall, England
- Died: 21 September 1926 (aged 80) Toowoomba, Queensland, Australia
- Resting place: Jondaryan Cemetery
- Party: Opposition
- Spouse: Margaret Christie (m.1884 d. 1931)
- Occupation: Company director

William James Paull (March 1846 – 21 September 1926) was a company director and member of the Queensland Legislative Assembly.

== Early days ==
Paull was born in Cran Crae, Cornwall, England to parents William Paull and his wife Ann (née Tregoning). and educated in Cornwall and North Wales. On leaving school he gained experience working in his step-father's silver and lead mines. He migrated to Australia in 1873, firstly to South Australia where he managed the Yandana copper mines and then the Blinman copper mine and smelting works.

In 1882 he arrived in Queensland where he became the mine director and partner in Pajingo Station, Charters Towers.

== Political career ==
After spending time as a councilor at Charters Towers including two terms as mayor in 1898 and 1901, Paull, standing for the Oppositionists, won the seat of Charters Towers in 1905. He held the seat for two and a half years, being defeated in 1908.

== Personal life ==
In 1884, Paull married Margaret Christie (died 1931) in Melbourne. They had four sons together. He retired to Codrington Farm, Bowenville, Darling Downs, in 1908 and died in Toowoomba in 1926.

Parliament of Queensland
Preceded by John Dunsford	Member for Charters Towers; 1905–1908; Served alongside: John Burrows, Joe Millican	Succeeded by John Mullan
