= Electoral district of Charters Towers =

Former electoral district of Queensland

Charters Towers Queensland—Legislative Assembly
- State: Queensland
- Dates current: 1888–1960; 1992–2009
- Namesake: Charters Towers

Charters Towers was an electoral district of the Legislative Assembly in the Australian state of Queensland. It has had three incarnations, most recently being created as part of a redistribution in 1991 and lasting until 2008.

The latest incarnation of Charters Towers was created in 1992, largely as a replacement for the abolished Flinders. The electorate covered a vast area of central Queensland, from Etheridge Shire in the north to Jericho Shire in the south. Besides its namesake town, Charters Towers, other major locations within the division included Georgetown, Hughenden, Richmond, Moranbah, Clermont, Tieri, Alpha, Aramac and Muttaburra. It was located in what was now National heartland, and was held by that party and its successor, the Liberal National Party, for all but one term. The seat fell to Labor during its 2001 landslide, but reverted to its conservative ways in 2004.

In 2008, Charters Towers was abolished—with effect at the 2009 state election—as a result of a redistribution undertaken by the Electoral Commission of Queensland. Its former territory and voters were split between the districts of Burdekin, Gregory, Mount Isa and the new seat of Dalrymple. The seat's last member, Shane Knuth, transferred to Dalrymple.

An earlier district called Charters Towers based in the same region existed from 1888 to 1960—firstly as a dual member electorate, and from 1912 as a single member electorate. Its most notable representative was Anderson Dawson of the Labor Party, Premier of Queensland for six days in December 1899, and leader of the world's first parliamentary socialist government.

== Members for Charters Towers ==
First incarnation (1888–1912, 2 members)
Member	Party	Term	Member	Party	Term
Robert Sayers	Unaligned	1888–1893	Arthur Rutledge	Ministerialist	1888–1893
Anderson Dawson	Labour	1893–1901	John Dunsford	Labour	1893–1905
John Burrows	Labour	1901–1907	John Dunsford	Labour	1893–1905
John Burrows	Labour	1901–1907	William Paull	Opposition	1905–1908
Joe Millican	Opposition	1907–1908	William Paull	Opposition	1905–1908
Vernon Winstanley	Labour	1908–1912	John Mullan	Labour	1908–1912

Second incarnation (1912–1960, 1 member)
Member	Party	Term
Robert Wynn Williams	Ministerialist	1912–1915
William Wellington	Labor	1915–1939
Arthur Jones	Labor	1939–1957
Arthur Jones	Queensland Labor	1957–1960

Third incarnation (1992–2009, 1 member)
Member	Party	Term
Rob Mitchell	National	1992–2001
Christine Scott	Labor	2001–2004
Shane Knuth	National	2004–2008
Shane Knuth	Liberal National	2008–2009

== See also ==
- Electoral districts of Queensland
- Members of the Queensland Legislative Assembly by year
- Category:Members of the Queensland Legislative Assembly by name
