= Shane Knuth =

Australian politician

Shane Knuth MP
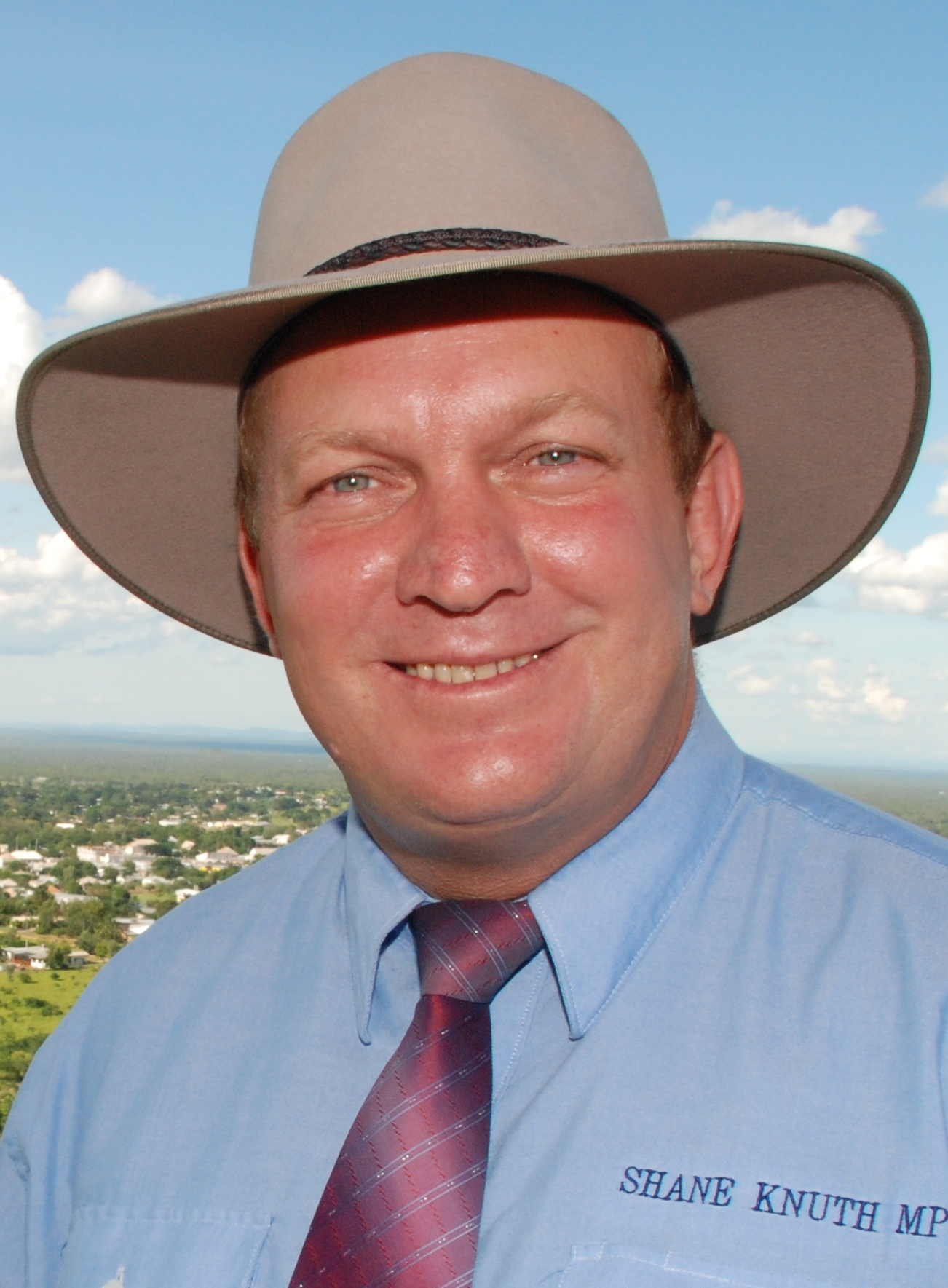

Shadow Minister for Mines and Energy
- In office 21 September 2006 – 29 January 2008
- Leader: Jeff Seeney
- Preceded by: Ray Hopper
- Succeeded by: Jeff Seeney

Member of the Queensland Parliament for Hill (2017–present) Dalrymple (2009–2017) Charters Towers (2004–2009)
- Incumbent
- Assumed office 7 February 2004
- Preceded by: Christine Scott

Personal details
- Born: Shane Andrew Knuth; 7 September 1966 (age 59) Tully, Queensland, Australia
- Party: Katter's Australian (2011–present)
- Other political affiliations: Pauline Hanson's One Nation (1997–1999); National (before 1997, 1999–2008); Liberal National (2008–2011)
- Relations: Jeff Knuth (brother)

Shane Andrew Knuth (born 7 September 1966) is an Australian politician. He has been a member of the Queensland Legislative Assembly since 2004, representing three successive seats: Charters Towers (2004–2009), Dalrymple (2009–2017) and Hill (2017–present). He has variously represented the National Party (2004–08), the Liberal National Party (2008–11) and Katter's Australian Party (2011–present).

== Biography ==
Knuth was born in the Far North Queensland town of Tully. His brother Jeff Knuth is a former One Nation parliamentarian.

Shane Knuth entered the state parliament as the member for Charters Towers at the 2004 state election by defeating incumbent MP Christine Scott of the Labor Party on One Nation preferences. At the 2006 state election, Knuth was re-elected with a large swing, reverting Charters Towers to its traditional status as a comfortably safe National seat.

Charters Towers was abolished in a redistribution ahead of the 2009 state election, and Knuth opted to contest the new seat of Dalrymple. The new seat merged most of his former territory, including the city of Charters Towers, with part of the former seat of Tablelands, represented by One Nation MP Rosa Lee Long. The new seat had a notional LNP majority of 57 percent, and Knuth won with only a small swing against him.

On 30 October 2011, Knuth resigned from the Liberal National Party to join Katter's Australian Party. Though most LNP MPs at the time were former Nationals like Knuth, Knuth contended the merger had been a Liberal takeover that had been "disastrous" for regional representation, and left rural MPs shut out of decision-making. Knuth also cited reports that the LNP's organisational wing grilled candidates, and had paid a former Labor official for compromising information on Labor MPs, including their sexual behaviour, as having influenced his decision.

At the 2012 state election, despite a massive swing to the LNP statewide, Knuth easily retained his seat, defeating his replacement as LNP candidate by a nearly 2-to-1 two-party margin, winning enough primary votes to retain the seat outright. He was re-elected almost as easily in 2015.

Dalrymple was abolished in a redistribution ahead of the 2017 election, and Knuth transferred to Hill, essentially the northern portion of his old seat. Although it was notionally a marginal Australian Party seat, Knuth won it on a massive swing of almost 15 percent, turning Hill into a very safe seat in one stroke.

Parliament of Queensland
| Preceded by Christine Scott | Member for Charters Towers; 2004–2009 | Seat abolished |
| New seat | Member for Dalrymple; 2009–2017 | Seat abolished |
| New seat | Member for Hill; 2017–present | Incumbent |
