= Queensland Labor Party =

State branch of the Australian Labor Party

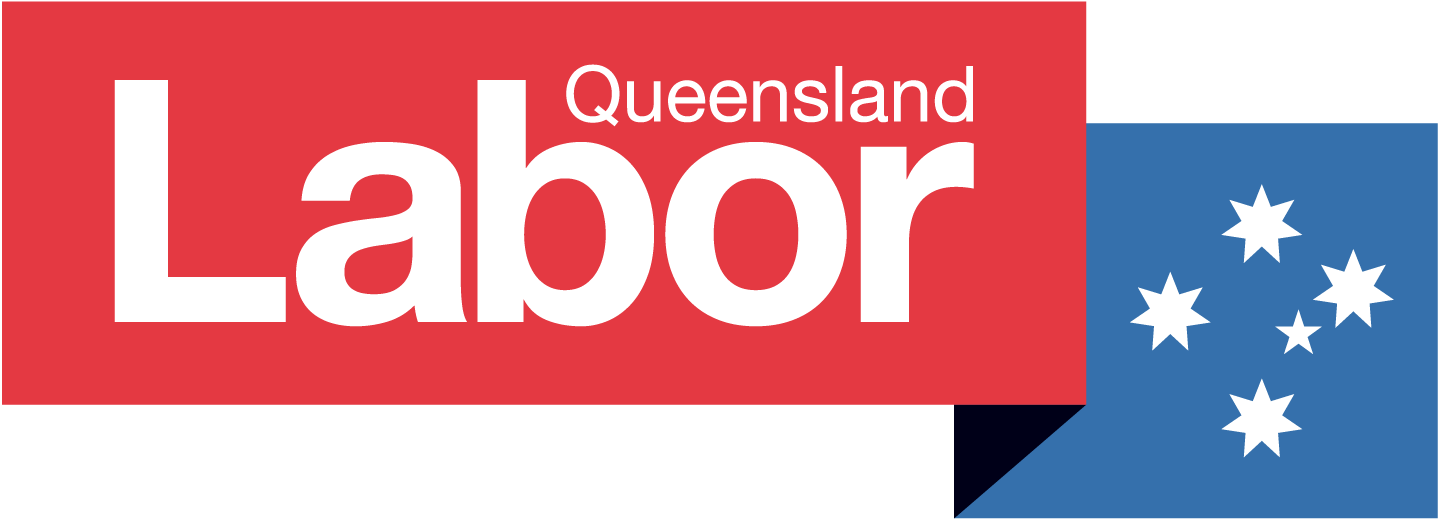
- Leader: Steven Miles
- Deputy Leader: Cameron Dick
- President: Fiona McNamara
- State Secretary: Ben Driscoll
- Founded: 5 August 1892; 134 years ago
- Headquarters: TLC Building, South Brisbane, Queensland
- Newspaper: The Daily Standard (1912–1936); The Worker (1890–1974)
- Think tank: T. J. Ryan Foundation
- Youth wing: Young Labor
- Membership (2021): ▲10,000 (Note: The membership of Queensland Labor has increased roughly 1,000 members since 2014 (8–9,000 members to 9–10,000 members).)
- Ideology: Social democracy; Majority faction: Democratic socialism
- Political position: Centre-left
- National affiliation: Australian Labor
- Union affiliate: QCU
- Colours: Red
- Slogan: Putting Queenslanders First
- Legislative Assembly: 36 / 93
- House of Representatives: 12 / 30 (Qld seats)
- Senate: 4 / 12 (Qld seats)
- Brisbane City Council: 5 / 26

Website
- queenslandlabor.org

The Queensland Labor Party, officially known as the Australian Labor Party (State of Queensland) and commonly referred to as Queensland Labor or simply Labor, is the branch of the Australian Labor Party (ALP) in the state of Queensland. It has functioned in the state since the 1890s. (Note: de facto.) The Queensland branch of the Australian Labor Party was the first Labour Party to win government in the world, when, in December 1899, following the resignation of the Dickson ministry, Queensland Labour leader Anderson Dawson accepted an offer by Lieutenant-Governor Samuel Griffith to form a government.

== History ==
Trade unionists in Queensland had begun attempting to secure parliamentary representation as early as the mid-1880s. William McNaughton Galloway, the president of the Seamen's Union, mounted an unsuccessful campaign as an independent in an 1886 by-election. A Workers' Political Reform Association was founded to nominate candidates for the 1888 election, at which the Brisbane Trades and Labor Council endorsed six candidates. Thomas Glassey won the seat of Bundamba at that election, becoming the first self-identified "labor" MP in Queensland. The Queensland Provincial Council of the Australian Labor Federation was formed in 1889 in an attempt to unite Labor campaign efforts. Tommy Ryan won the seat of Barcoo for the labour movement-run People's Parliamentary Association in 1892, and the Labor Party was formally established in Queensland following the first Labor-in-Politics Convention later that year.

The Queensland branch subsequently formed the first Labor government in Australia, albeit briefly, when Anderson Dawson took office for a week in 1899 after a falling out between the non-Labor forces. Since 1989, when the party came back to power after thirty-two years in Opposition, all its leaders have become premier despite two spells in Opposition in 1996–98 and 2012–2015.

=== Membership and voter base ===
Historically (1910s–1960s) Queensland Labor's voter base and membership has been distributed fairly equitably across the metropolitan, urban, and rural areas of the state, although maintaining a demographic majority within the South East region. Beginning in the 1970s, Queensland Labor's voter base in particular has swayed more heavily toward the metropolitan and urban areas of the state such as Brisbane, the Sunshine Coast, the Gold Coast, and Townsville, with the Country (later National) and Liberal parties competing with Labor in both regions as an electoral bloc.

2024 state election Queensland Labor seat distribution
Region	Electorates	Labor seats	%
Far North Queensland	5	1	20.00
North Queensland	7	—N/a	—N/a
Central Queensland	11	2	18.18
South-West Queensland	5	—N/a	—N/a
South East Queensland	65	33	50.77

==== Membership figures ====
Membership figures
Year	Membership	Diff.
1938	11,139	—N/a
1976	6,890	▼38.15
1978	6,618	▼3.95
1979	6,570	▼0.73
1980	6,171	▼6.07
1981	6,596	▲6.89
1982	6,776	▲2.73
1983	7,623	▲12.5
1984	8,086	▲6.07
1985	7,817	▼3.33
1986	7,756	▼0.78
1987	7,578	▼2.29
1988	7,125	▼5.98

Membership figures
Year	Membership	Diff.
1989	6,367	▼10.64
1990	7,169	▲12.60
1991	7,213	▲0.61
1992	7,246	▲0.46
1994	7,492	▲3.39
1995	6,800	▼9.24
1996	6,800	Steady
1998	7,937	▲16.72
2012	5,000	▼37.00
2014	9,000	▲80.00
2021	10,000	▲11.11

== Ideology ==
Parliamentary caucus seats
- Labor Left (Note: Leeanne Enoch, Chris Whiting, Tom Smith, Lance McCallum, Meaghan Scanlon, Glenn Butcher, Jennifer Howard, Shane King, Melissa McMahon, Corrine McMillan, Mark Bailey, Mark Ryan, Steven Miles, Nikki Boyd, Barbara O'Shea, Mick de Brenni, Peter Russo, Shannon Fentiman): 18 / 36
- Labor Unity (Old-Guard): 6 / 36
- Labor Forum: 12 / 36

Historically, the Queensland Labor Party was rooted in socialist principles, advocating for state socialism and agrarian socialism, with the party being broadly left-wing. Prior to 1908, the party also had a radical liberal faction, which split to form the Kidstonites in 1908. Over time, like other Labor/Labour parties, the party has shifted towards the centre-left of the political spectrum. The platform programme describes its founding principle as democratic socialism, while observers describe the Queensland Labor Party as social democratic, supporting labourism, which prioritises the rights and conditions of workers, fair wages, and secure employment.

=== Factions ===
The Labor Party internal politics has a variety of internal factions; however, since 1989, it has been organised into formal factions. As of 2025, the Queensland branch has three factions: the Left, led by Leader of the Opposition and former Premier Steven Miles, Labor Forum (also known as the Right), led by Cameron Dick, and Labor Unity (also known as the 'Old Guard'), led by Grace Grace. The Left holds 18 seats, with Labor Forum holding 12 seats and Labor Unity 6.

== Local government ==
Labor contests Brisbane City Council elections, and has done so since the inaugural election in 1925. It has been in opposition to the LNP (and before that, the Liberal Party) since 2008. The last Labor member to serve as Lord Mayor of Brisbane was Tim Quinn, who was defeated in 2004.

Historically, Labor also endorsed candidates outside of Brisbane, including in Ipswich, Townsville and Toowoomba.

The current Labor leader on Brisbane City Council is Jared Cassidy, who has served in the position since September 2019.

== Leadership ==
=== Leader ===
The full list below is the official record of parliamentary leaders:

No.	Leader (birth–death)	Portrait	Electorate	Term of office	
1	Thomas Glassey (1844–1936)		Bundamba	August; 1892	May; 1893
1	Thomas Glassey (1844–1936)		Bundamba	274 days	
2	John Hoolan (1842–1911)		Burke	May; 1893	July; 1894
2	John Hoolan (1842–1911)		Burke	1 year and 62 days	
(1)	Thomas Glassey (1844–1936)		Bundamba	July; 1894	May; 1899
(1)	Thomas Glassey (1844–1936)		Bundamba	4 years and 305 days	
3	Anderson Dawson (1863–1910)		Charters Towers	May; 1899	July; 1900
3	Anderson Dawson (1863–1910)		Charters Towers	1 year and 62 days	
4	W. H. Browne (1846–1904)		Croydon	July; 1900	October; 1903
4	W. H. Browne (1846–1904)		Croydon	3 years and 93 days	
5	Peter Airey (1865–1950)		Flinders	October; 1903	April; 1904
5	Peter Airey (1865–1950)		Flinders	184 days	
6	George Kerr (1853–1930)		Barcoo	April; 1904	April; 1907
6	George Kerr (1853–1930)		Barcoo	3 years and 1 day	
7	David Bowman (1860–1916)		Fortitude Valley	April; 1907	9 September 1912
7	David Bowman (1860–1916)		Fortitude Valley	5 years and 162 days	
8	T. J. Ryan (1876–1921)		Barcoo	9 September 1912	22 October 1919
8	T. J. Ryan (1876–1921)		Barcoo	7 years and 44 days	
9	Ted Theodore (1884–1950)		Woothakata	22 October 1919	26 February 1925
9	Ted Theodore (1884–1950)		Woothakata	5 years and 128 days	
10	William Gillies (1868–1928)		Eacham	26 February 1925	22 October 1925
10	William Gillies (1868–1928)		Eacham	239 days	
11	William McCormack (1879–1947)		Cairns	22 October 1925	21 May 1929
11	William McCormack (1879–1947)		Cairns	3 years and 212 days	
12	William Forgan Smith (1887–1953)		Mackay	27 May 1929	16 September 1942
12	William Forgan Smith (1887–1953)		Mackay	13 years and 113 days	
13	Frank Arthur Cooper (1872–1949)		Bremer	16 September 1942	7 March 1946
13	Frank Arthur Cooper (1872–1949)		Bremer	3 years and 173 days	
14	Ned Hanlon (1887–1952)		Ithaca	7 March 1946	15 January 1952
14	Ned Hanlon (1887–1952)		Ithaca	5 years and 315 days	
15	Vince Gair (1901–1980)		South Brisbane	17 January 1952	24 April 1957
15	Vince Gair (1901–1980)		South Brisbane	5 years and 98 days	
16	Jack Duggan (1910–1993)		Toowoomba	30 April 1957	3 August 1957
16	Jack Duggan (1910–1993)		Toowoomba	96 days	
17	Les Wood (1907–1958)		North Toowoomba	28 August 1957	29 March 1958
17	Les Wood (1907–1958)		North Toowoomba	214 days	
18	Jim Donald (1895–1976)		Ipswich East	14 April 1958	17 August 1958
18	Jim Donald (1895–1976)		Ipswich East	126 days	
(16)	Jack Duggan (1910–1993)		Toowoomba West	18 August 1958	11 October 1966
(16)	Jack Duggan (1910–1993)		Toowoomba West	8 years and 55 days	
19	Jack Houston (1919–2008)		Bulimba	11 October 1966	22 July 1974
19	Jack Houston (1919–2008)		Bulimba	7 years and 285 days	
20	Perc Tucker (1919–1980)		Townsville West	22 July 1974	19 December 1974
20	Perc Tucker (1919–1980)		Townsville West	151 days	
21	Tom Burns (1931–2007)		Lytton	19 December 1974	28 November 1978
21	Tom Burns (1931–2007)		Lytton	3 years and 345 days	
22	Ed Casey (1933–2006)		Mackay	28 November 1978	20 October 1982
22	Ed Casey (1933–2006)		Mackay	3 years and 327 days	
23	Keith Wright (1942–2015)		Rockhampton	20 October 1982	29 August 1984
23	Keith Wright (1942–2015)		Rockhampton	1 year and 315 days	
24	Nev Warburton (1932–2018)		Sandgate	29 August 1984	2 March 1988
24	Nev Warburton (1932–2018)		Sandgate	3 years and 187 days	
25	Wayne Goss (1951–2014)		Logan	2 March 1988	19 February 1996
25	Wayne Goss (1951–2014)		Logan	7 years and 355 days	
26	Peter Beattie (b. 1952)		Brisbane Central	19 February 1996	12 September 2007
26	Peter Beattie (b. 1952)		Brisbane Central	11 years and 206 days	
27	Anna Bligh (b. 1960)		South Brisbane	12 September 2007	28 March 2012
27	Anna Bligh (b. 1960)		South Brisbane	4 years and 199 days	
28	Annastacia Palaszczuk (b. 1969)		Inala	30 March 2012	15 December 2023
28	Annastacia Palaszczuk (b. 1969)		Inala	11 years and 261 days	
29	Steven Miles (b. 1977)		Murrumba	15 December 2023	Incumbent
29	Steven Miles (b. 1977)		Murrumba	2 years and 308 days	

=== President ===
The list below is a record of presidents of the state party executive:

No.	President (birth–death)	Portrait	Other offices held	Term of office	
1	Thomas Glassey (1844–1936)		Leader of the Queensland Parliamentary Labor Party (1892–1893, 1894–1899); Leader of the Opposition in Queensland (1898–1899); Member for Bundamba (1888–1893); Member for Burke (1894–1896); Member for Bundaberg (1896–1901); Senator for Queensland (1901–1903)	5 August 1892	29 June 1899
1	Thomas Glassey (1844–1936)		Leader of the Queensland Parliamentary Labor Party (1892–1893, 1894–1899); Leader of the Opposition in Queensland (1898–1899); Member for Bundamba (1888–1893); Member for Burke (1894–1896); Member for Bundaberg (1896–1901); Senator for Queensland (1901–1903)	6 years and 329 days	
2	Anderson Dawson (1863–1910)		Leader of the Queensland Parliamentary Labor Party (1899–1900); Premier of Queensland (1899); Leader of the Opposition in Queensland (1899, 1899–1900); Member for Charters Towers (1893–1901); Senator for Queensland (1901–1906)	29 June 1899	11 August 1900
2	Anderson Dawson (1863–1910)		Leader of the Queensland Parliamentary Labor Party (1899–1900); Premier of Queensland (1899); Leader of the Opposition in Queensland (1899, 1899–1900); Member for Charters Towers (1893–1901); Senator for Queensland (1901–1906)	1 year and 44 days	
3	Billy Browne (1846–1904)		Leader of the Queensland Parliamentary Labor Party (1900–1903); Leader of the Opposition in Queensland (1900–1903); Member for Croydon (1893–1904)	11 August 1900	9 October 1903
3	Billy Browne (1846–1904)		Leader of the Queensland Parliamentary Labor Party (1900–1903); Leader of the Opposition in Queensland (1900–1903); Member for Croydon (1893–1904)	3 years and 60 days	
4	Peter Airey (1865–1950)		Member for Flinders (1901–1907)	9 October 1903	30 May 1904
4	Peter Airey (1865–1950)		Member for Flinders (1901–1907)	235 days	
5	George Kerr (1853–1930)		Leader of the Queensland Parliamentary Labor Party (1904–1907); Member for Barcoo (1893–1909)	30 May 1904	30 May 1905
5	George Kerr (1853–1930)		Leader of the Queensland Parliamentary Labor Party (1904–1907); Member for Barcoo (1893–1909)	1 year and 1 day	
6	Mat Reid (1856–1947)		Member for Toowong (1893–1896); Member for Enoggera (1899–1902)	30 May 1905	8 November 1909
6	Mat Reid (1856–1947)		Member for Toowong (1893–1896); Member for Enoggera (1899–1902)	4 years and 163 days	
7	David Bowman (1860–1916)		Leader of the Queensland Parliamentary Labor Party (1907–1912); Leader of the Opposition in Queensland (1908–1912); Member for Warrego (1899–1902); Member for Fortitude Valley (1904–1916)	8 November 1909	30 September 1912
7	David Bowman (1860–1916)		Leader of the Queensland Parliamentary Labor Party (1907–1912); Leader of the Opposition in Queensland (1908–1912); Member for Warrego (1899–1902); Member for Fortitude Valley (1904–1916)	2 years and 328 days	
8	T. J. Ryan (1876–1921)		Leader of the Queensland Parliamentary Labor Party (1912–1919); Premier of Queensland (1915–1919); Leader of the Opposition in Queensland (1912–1915); Member for Barcoo (1909–1919)	30 September 1912	1 March 1916
8	T. J. Ryan (1876–1921)		Leader of the Queensland Parliamentary Labor Party (1912–1919); Premier of Queensland (1915–1919); Leader of the Opposition in Queensland (1912–1915); Member for Barcoo (1909–1919)	3 years and 154 days	
9	Billy Demaine (1859–1939)		Member of the Queensland Legislative Council (1917–1922); Maryborough City Councillor (1896–1900, 1924–1939); Mayor of Maryborough (1933–1939); Member for Maryborough (1937–1938)	1 March 1916	21 February 1938
9	Billy Demaine (1859–1939)		Member of the Queensland Legislative Council (1917–1922); Maryborough City Councillor (1896–1900, 1924–1939); Mayor of Maryborough (1933–1939); Member for Maryborough (1937–1938)	21 years and 358 days	
10	Clarrie Fallon (1890–1950)		Queensland Secretary of the Australian Workers' Union (1933–1950); National General Secretary of the Australian Workers' Union (1941–1943); National President of the Labor Party (1938–1944)	21 February 1938	11 January 1950
10	Clarrie Fallon (1890–1950)		Queensland Secretary of the Australian Workers' Union (1933–1950); National General Secretary of the Australian Workers' Union (1941–1943); National President of the Labor Party (1938–1944)	11 years and 325 days	
11	Harry Boland (1891–1956)		Queensland President of the Australian Workers' Union (1947–1951); Queensland Secretary of the Australian Workers' Union (1950–1956)	20 February 1950	25 July 1956
11	Harry Boland (1891–1956)		Queensland President of the Australian Workers' Union (1947–1951); Queensland Secretary of the Australian Workers' Union (1950–1956)	6 years and 157 days	
12	Joe Bukowski (1901–1960)		Queensland President of the Australian Workers' Union (1951–1960)	25 July 1956	19 December 1958
12	Joe Bukowski (1901–1960)		Queensland President of the Australian Workers' Union (1951–1960)	2 years and 148 days	
13	George Whiteside (1902–1976)		Queensland Secretary of the Federated Engine Drivers' and Firemen's Association (1946–1962); Senator for Queensland (1962–1963)	19 December 1958	February; 1963
13	George Whiteside (1902–1976)		Queensland Secretary of the Federated Engine Drivers' and Firemen's Association (1946–1962); Senator for Queensland (1962–1963)	4 years and 45 days	

== Election results ==
=== State elections ===
Queensland Legislative Assembly
Election	Leader	Votes	%	Seats	+/–	Position	Status
1893	Thomas Glassey	25,984	33.32	16 / 72	▲16	▲2nd	Opposition
1896	Thomas Glassey	28,581	34.97	20 / 72	▲4	2nd	Opposition
1899	Thomas Glassey	33,756	35.47	21 / 72	▲1	2nd	Opposition
1902	William Browne	39,579	39.33	25 / 72	▲4	2nd	Opposition
1904	George Kerr	28,961	36.05	34 / 72	▲9	▲1st	Opposition
1907	David Bowman	52,079	26.39	18 / 72	▼16	▼3rd	Opposition
1908	David Bowman	55,771	29.80	22 / 72	▲4	3rd	Opposition
1909	David Bowman	77,712	36.85	27 / 72	▲5	▲2nd	Opposition
1912	David Bowman	100,878	46.70	25 / 72	▼2	2nd	Opposition
1915	T. J. Ryan	136,419	52.06	45 / 72	▲20	▲1st	Majority
1918	T. J. Ryan	180,709	53.68	48 / 72	▲3	1st	Majority
1920	Ted Theodore	168,455	47.77	38 / 72	▼7	1st	Majority
1923	Ted Theodore	175,659	48.13	43 / 72	▲5	1st	Majority
1926	William McCormack	189,968	47.96	43 / 72	0	1st	Majority
1929	William McCormack	173,242	40.16	27 / 72	▼16	▼2nd	Opposition
1932	William Forgan Smith	225,270	49.89	33 / 62	▲6	▲1st	Majority
1935	William Forgan Smith	247,135	53.43	46 / 62	▲13	1st	Majority
1938	William Forgan Smith	250,943	47.17	44 / 62	▼2	1st	Majority
1941	William Forgan Smith	267,206	51.41	41 / 62	▼3	1st	Majority
1944	Frank Arthur Cooper	224,888	44.67	37 / 62	▼4	1st	Majority
1947	Ned Hanlon	272,103	43.58	35 / 62	▼2	1st	Majority
1950	Ned Hanlon	295,138	46.87	42 / 75	▲7	1st	Majority
1953	Vince Gair	323,882	53.21	50 / 75	▲8	1st	Majority
1956	Vince Gair	335,311	51.22	49 / 75	▼1	1st	Majority
1957	Jack Duggan	201,971	28.90	20 / 75	▼29	▼2nd	Opposition
1960	Jack Duggan	296,430	39.89	25 / 78	▲5	2nd	Opposition
1963	Jack Duggan	337,928	43.83	26 / 78	▲1	▲1st	Opposition
1966	Jack Duggan	350,254	43.84	26 / 78	0	▼2nd	Opposition
1969	Jack Houston	383,388	44.99	31 / 78	▲5	▲1st	Opposition
1972	Jack Houston	424,002	46.75	33 / 82	▲2	1st	Opposition
1974	Perc Tucker	376,187	36.03	11 / 82	▼22	▼3rd	Opposition
1977	Tom Burns	466,021	42.83	23 / 82	▲12	3rd	Opposition
1980	Ed Casey	487,493	41.49	25 / 82	▲2	▲2nd	Opposition
1983	Keith Wright	579,363	43.98	32 / 82	▲7	2nd	Opposition
1986	Nev Warburton	577,062	41.35	30 / 89	▼2	2nd	Opposition
1989	Wayne Goss	792,466	50.32	54 / 89	▲24	▲1st	Majority
1992	Wayne Goss	850,480	48.73	54 / 89	0	1st	Majority
1995	Wayne Goss	773,585	42.89	45 / 89	▼9	1st	Majority
1998	Peter Beattie	773,585	38.86	44 / 89	▼1	1st	Minority
2001	Peter Beattie	1,007,737	48.93	66 / 89	▲22	1st	Majority
2004	Peter Beattie	1,011,630	47.01	63 / 89	▼3	1st	Majority
2006	Peter Beattie	1,032,617	46.92	59 / 89	▼4	1st	Majority
2009	Anna Bligh	1,002,415	42.25	51 / 89	▼8	1st	Majority
2012	Anna Bligh	652,092	26.66	7 / 89	▼44	▼2nd	Opposition
2015	Annastacia Palaszczuk	983,054	37.47	44 / 89	▲35	▲1st	Minority
2017	Annastacia Palaszczuk	957,890	35.43	48 / 93	▲4	1st	Majority
2020	Annastacia Palaszczuk	1,135,625	39.57	52 / 93	▲4	1st	Majority
2024	Steven Miles	1,011,252	32.56	36 / 93	▼16	▼2nd	Opposition

=== Federal elections ===
Australian House of Representatives
Election	Seats Won	±	Total votes	%	±	Leader
1901	3 / 9	▲3	21,264	34.80	▲34.80	No leader
1903	7 / 9	▲4	63,878	56.70	▲21.90	Chris Watson
1906	4 / 9	▼3	51,231	43.00	▼13.70	Chris Watson
1910	6 / 9	▲2	78,881	47.60	▲4.60	Andrew Fisher
1913	7 / 10	▲1	149,447	54.80	▲7.20	Andrew Fisher
1914	7 / 10	0	125,017	55.70	▲0.90	Andrew Fisher
1917	4 / 10	▼3	160,448	48.70	▼7.00	Frank Tudor
1919	3 / 10	▼1	149,588	46.80	▼1.90	Frank Tudor
1922	2 / 10	▼1	132,515	41.40	▼5.40	Matthew Charlton
1925	1 / 10	▼1	152,778	42.40	▲1.00	Matthew Charlton
1928	2 / 10	▲1	112,982	47.40	▲5.00	James Scullin
1929	3 / 10	▲1	173,417	39.80	▼7.60	James Scullin
1931	5 / 10	▲2	141,443	39.30	▼0.50	James Scullin
1934	5 / 10	0	235,904	46.80	▲7.50	James Scullin
1937	5 / 10	0	233,612	43.00	▼3.80	John Curtin
1940	6 / 10	▲1	255,063	46.10	▲3.10	John Curtin
1943	6 / 10	0	279,372	47.80	▲1.70	John Curtin
1946	5 / 10	▼1	256,370	43.10	▼4.70	Ben Chifley
1949	3 / 18	▼2	255,036	39.50	▼3.60	Ben Chifley
1951	4 / 18	▲1	257,099	41.00	▲1.50	Ben Chifley
1954	5 / 18	▲1	295,424	42.50	▲1.50	H.V. Evatt
1955	5 / 18	0	258,994	42.10	▼0.40	H.V. Evatt
1958	3 / 18	▼2	270,676	37.50	▼4.60	H.V. Evatt
1961	11 / 18	▲8	365,930	48.10	▲10.60	Arthur Calwell
1963	8 / 18	▼3	369,570	46.30	▼1.80	Arthur Calwell
1966	6 / 18	▼2	354,674	42.10	▼4.20	Arthur Calwell
1969	7 / 18	▲1	430,403	48.20	▲6.10	Gough Whitlam
1972	8 / 18	▲1	449,620	47.20	▼1.00	Gough Whitlam
1974	6 / 18	▼2	476,710	44.00	▼3.20	Gough Whitlam
1975	1 / 18	▼5	439,405	38.80	▼5.20	Gough Whitlam
1977	3 / 19	▲2	443,221	37.70	▼1.10	Gough Whitlam
1980	5 / 19	▲2	535,800	42.80	▲5.10	Bill Hayden
1983	10 / 19	▲5	621,146	46.10	▲3.30	Bob Hawke
1984	9 / 24	▼1	605,684	44.10	▼2.00	Bob Hawke
1987	13 / 24	▲4	683,640	45.00	▲0.90	Bob Hawke
1990	15 / 24	▲2	695,291	41.60	▼3.40	Bob Hawke
1993	13 / 25	▼2	739,862	40.50	▼1.10	Paul Keating
1996	2 / 26	▼11	639,510	33.20	▼7.30	Paul Keating
1998	8 / 27	▲6	719,743	36.10	▲2.90	Kim Beazley
2001	7 / 27	▼1	730,914	34.70	▼1.40	Kim Beazley
2004	6 / 28	▼1	765,507	34.78	▲0.08	Mark Latham
2007	15 / 29	▲9	1,020,665	42.91	▲8.13	Kevin Rudd
2010	8 / 30	▼7	800,712	33.58	▼9.33	Julia Gillard
2013	6 / 30	▼2	751,230	29.77	▼3.81	Kevin Rudd
2016	8 / 30	▲2	825,627	30.91	▲1.14	Bill Shorten
2019	6 / 30	▼2	754,792	26.68	▼4.23	Bill Shorten
2022	5 / 30	▼1	784,189	27.5	▲0.8	Anthony Albanese
2025	12 / 30	▲7	975,898	31.0	▲3.6	Anthony Albanese
