= Electoral results for the Division of Wide Bay =

Australian division election results

This is a list of electoral results for the Division of Wide Bay in Australian federal elections from the division's creation in 1901 until the present.

== Members ==
Member	Party	Term
Andrew Fisher	Labor	1901–1915
Edward Corser	Liberal	1915–1916
Edward Corser	Nationalist	1916–1928
Bernard Corser	Country	1928–1954
William Brand	Country	1954–1958
Henry Bandidt	Country	1958–1961
Brendan Hansen	Labor	1961–1974
Clarrie Millar	Country, National	1974–1990
Warren Truss	National	1990–2010
Warren Truss	Liberal National	2010–2016
Llew O'Brien	Liberal National	2016–present

== Election results ==
=== Elections in the 2020s ===
==== 2025 ====
2025 Australian federal election: Wide Bay
Party	Candidate	Votes	%	±%
Family First	Kirsti Kenningale			
Labor	Elliott Chalmers			
One Nation	Chad Burgess			
Liberal National	Llew O'Brien			
Independent	Casey Iddon			
Greens	Emma Buhse			
Trumpet of Patriots	Gabrial Pennicott			
Total formal votes				
Informal votes				
Turnout				

==== 2022 ====
2022 Australian federal election: Wide Bay
Party	Candidate	Votes	%	±%
Liberal National	Llew O'Brien	41,601	43.47	−3.62
Labor	Geoff Williams	20,345	21.26	−0.49
One Nation	Nathan Buckley	9,765	10.20	−0.63
Greens	Craig Armstrong	9,088	9.50	−0.44
United Australia	Tracy Bennett	4,406	4.60	+0.99
Independent	Kelli Jacobi	4,106	4.29	+4.29
Independent	Tim Jerome	2,737	2.86	−1.64
Informed Medical Options	Andrea Newland	2,097	2.19	+2.19
Australian Values	Daniel Williams	1,057	1.10	+1.10
Federation	John Woodward	501	0.52	+0.52
Total formal votes		95,703	93.58	−1.68
Informal votes		6,569	6.42	+1.68
Turnout		102,272	88.69	−2.98
Two-party-preferred result
Liberal National	Llew O'Brien	58,708	61.34	−1.81
Labor	Geoff Williams	36,995	38.66	+1.81
Liberal National hold		Swing	−1.81	

Alluvial diagram for preference flows in the seat of Wide Bay in the 2022 federal election. indicates at what stage the winning candidate had over 50% of the votes and was declared the winner.

=== Elections in the 2010s ===
==== 2019 ====
2019 Australian federal election: Wide Bay
Party	Candidate	Votes	%	±%
Liberal National	Llew O'Brien	44,204	47.09	+3.23
Labor	Jason Scanes	20,418	21.75	−0.81
One Nation	Aaron Vico	10,166	10.83	−4.73
Greens	Daniel Bryar	9,330	9.94	+1.74
Independent	Tim Jerome	4,220	4.50	+4.50
United Australia	Andrew Schebella	3,385	3.61	+3.61
Conservative National	Jasmine Smith	2,149	2.29	+2.29
Total formal votes		93,872	95.26	+0.26
Informal votes		4,667	4.74	−0.26
Turnout		98,539	91.67	−0.11
Two-party-preferred result
Liberal National	Llew O'Brien	59,279	63.15	+4.96
Labor	Jason Scanes	34,593	36.85	−4.96
Liberal National hold		Swing	+4.96	

==== 2016 ====
2016 Australian federal election: Wide Bay
Party	Candidate	Votes	%	±%
Liberal National	Llew O'Brien	39,373	43.80	−5.07
Labor	Lucy Stanton	20,301	22.58	+1.87
One Nation	Elise Cottam	14,022	15.60	+15.60
Greens	Bron Marsh	7,355	8.18	+1.63
Glenn Lazarus Team	Jannean Dean	4,082	4.54	+4.54
Family First	Bruce Mayer	2,399	2.67	+1.17
Katter's Australian	Barry Cook	2,357	2.62	−3.26
Total formal votes		89,889	95.00	−0.32
Informal votes		4,728	5.00	+0.32
Turnout		94,617	91.99	−2.22
Two-party-preferred result
Liberal National	Llew O'Brien	52,264	58.14	−5.02
Labor	Lucy Stanton	37,625	41.86	+5.02
Liberal National hold		Swing	−5.02	

==== 2013 ====
2013 Australian federal election: Wide Bay
Party	Candidate	Votes	%	±%
Liberal National	Warren Truss	41,767	48.87	−9.99
Labor	Lucy Stanton	17,697	20.71	−3.39
Palmer United	Stephen Anderson	13,574	15.88	+15.88
Greens	Joy Ringrose	5,596	6.55	−4.45
Katter's Australian	Gordon Dale	5,022	5.88	+5.88
Family First	John Chapman	1,286	1.50	−2.24
Rise Up Australia	Grace Dickins	517	0.60	+0.60
Total formal votes		85,459	95.32	+0.57
Informal votes		4,199	4.68	−0.57
Turnout		89,658	94.25	+1.35
Two-party-preferred result
Liberal National	Warren Truss	53,975	63.16	−2.45
Labor	Lucy Stanton	31,484	36.84	+2.45
Liberal National hold		Swing	−2.45	

==== 2010 ====
2010 Australian federal election: Wide Bay
Party	Candidate	Votes	%	±%
Liberal National	Warren Truss	47,977	58.86	+10.25
Labor	Nikolee Ansell	19,645	24.10	−6.87
Greens	Jim McDonald	8,967	11.00	+2.96
Family First	Ken Herschell	3,049	3.74	+0.29
One Nation	Santo Ferraro	1,875	2.30	+1.09
Total formal votes		81,513	94.75	−1.25
Informal votes		4,519	5.25	+1.25
Turnout		86,032	92.87	−1.66
Two-party-preferred result
Liberal National	Warren Truss	53,484	65.61	+7.22
Labor	Nikolee Ansell	28,029	34.39	−7.22
Liberal National hold		Swing	+7.22	

=== Elections in the 2000s ===
==== 2007 ====
2007 Australian federal election: Wide Bay
Party	Candidate	Votes	%	±%
National	Warren Truss	39,177	48.59	+20.76
Labor	Tony Lawrence	24,758	30.70	+5.19
Greens	Katherine Webb	6,615	8.20	+1.19
Independent	Cate Molloy	5,576	6.92	+6.92
Family First	John Chapman	2,792	3.46	−0.13
One Nation	Martin Essenberg	996	1.24	−2.90
Democrats	Terry Shaw	719	0.89	−0.85
Total formal votes		80,633	96.02	+0.95
Informal votes		3,343	3.98	−0.95
Turnout		83,976	94.41	−0.55
Two-party-preferred result
National	Warren Truss	47,149	58.47	−3.74
Labor	Tony Lawrence	33,484	41.53	+3.74
National hold		Swing	−3.74	

==== 2004 ====
2004 Australian federal election: Wide Bay
Party	Candidate	Votes	%	±%
National	Warren Truss	38,544	47.08	+13.51
Labor	Sean Ambrose	21,031	25.69	−0.97
Independent	Lars Hedberg	9,980	12.19	+12.19
One Nation	Wesley Robinson	4,048	4.94	−6.21
Greens	Ian Richards	3,624	4.43	+2.32
Family First	Glen Wilson	2,899	3.54	+3.54
Democrats	Darryl Weir	935	1.14	−1.04
Independent	Cy D'Oliviera	816	1.00	+1.00
Total formal votes		81,877	95.22	+0.44
Informal votes		4,112	4.78	−0.44
Turnout		85,989	94.63	−0.16
Two-party-preferred result
National	Warren Truss	51,489	62.89	+2.99
Labor	Sean Ambrose	30,388	37.11	−2.99
National hold		Swing	+2.99	

==== 2001 ====
2001 Australian federal election: Wide Bay
Party	Candidate	Votes	%	±%
National	Warren Truss	33,124	45.15	+13.69
Labor	Russ Tremlin	19,733	26.90	−1.53
One Nation	Jim Dwyer	8,176	11.15	−15.19
Independent	Graeme Wicks	3,380	4.61	+4.61
Independent	David Dalgleish	3,192	4.35	+4.35
Independent	Tony Pitt	2,650	3.61	+3.61
Greens	Paul Jansen	1,385	1.89	+0.61
Democrats	Althea Smith	1,230	1.68	−0.49
Citizens Electoral Council	Maurice Hetherington	489	0.67	+0.67
Total formal votes		73,359	94.43	−2.30
Informal votes		4,329	5.57	+2.30
Turnout		77,688	96.04	
Two-party-preferred result
National	Warren Truss	44,548	60.73	+7.87
Labor	Russ Tremlin	28,811	39.27	−7.87
National hold		Swing	+7.87	

=== Elections in the 1990s ===
==== 1998 ====
1998 Australian federal election: Wide Bay
Party	Candidate	Votes	%	±%
National	Warren Truss	22,569	31.46	−27.78
Labor	Russ Tremlin	20,391	28.42	+1.05
One Nation	Graeme Wicks	18,891	26.33	+26.33
Liberal	Desley Fraser	5,937	8.28	+7.79
Democrats	Phil Rodhouse	1,552	2.16	−4.75
Independent	Bob Postle	1,480	2.06	+2.06
Greens	Richard Nielsen	917	1.28	+1.21
Total formal votes		71,737	96.73	−0.41
Informal votes		2,427	3.27	+0.41
Turnout		74,164	95.07	−0.85
Two-party-preferred result
National	Warren Truss	37,923	52.86	−15.32
Labor	Russ Tremlin	33,814	47.14	+15.32
National hold		Swing	−15.32	

==== 1996 ====
1996 Australian federal election: Wide Bay
Party	Candidate	Votes	%	±%
National	Warren Truss	43,670	59.55	+16.88
Labor	Alan Holmes	19,390	26.44	−7.55
Democrats	Pamela South	5,415	7.38	+3.78
Independent	John Francis	2,891	3.94	+3.94
Indigenous Peoples	Charlie Watson	1,064	1.45	+1.45
One Australia	Wayne Skilton	908	1.24	+1.24
Total formal votes		73,338	97.09	−0.60
Informal votes		2,201	2.91	+0.60
Turnout		75,539	95.92	+0.00
Two-party-preferred result
National	Warren Truss	50,157	68.53	+9.74
Labor	Alan Holmes	23,037	31.47	−9.74
National hold		Swing	+9.74	

==== 1993 ====
1993 Australian federal election: Wide Bay
Party	Candidate	Votes	%	±%
National	Warren Truss	33,255	44.07	−3.76
Labor	Judy Caplick	24,861	32.94	−3.53
Liberal	Trevor Hartshorne	6,519	8.64	+8.05
Confederate Action	Andrew Baker	4,279	5.67	+5.67
Democrats	Marie Woodley	2,700	3.58	−9.22
Greens	Lily Podger	2,083	2.76	+2.76
Independent	Ray Smith	1,770	2.35	+2.35
Total formal votes		75,467	97.69	+0.20
Informal votes		1,786	2.31	−0.20
Turnout		77,253	95.92	
Two-party-preferred result
National	Warren Truss	45,043	59.71	+4.12
Labor	Judy Caplick	30,390	40.29	−4.12
National hold		Swing	+4.12	

==== 1990 ====
1990 Australian federal election: Wide Bay
Party	Candidate	Votes	%	±%
National	Warren Truss	32,498	47.3	−3.2
Labor	Andrew Foley	25,347	36.9	−0.6
Democrats	Bryan Sandall	9,108	13.3	+8.8
Independent	John Zschech	1,695	2.5	+2.5
Total formal votes		68,648	97.5	
Informal votes		1,738	2.5	
Turnout		70,386	95.6	
Two-party-preferred result
National	Warren Truss	37,613	54.9	−3.9
Labor	Andrew Foley	30,885	45.1	+3.9
National hold		Swing	−3.9	

=== Elections in the 1980s ===
==== 1987 ====
1987 Australian federal election: Wide Bay
Party	Candidate	Votes	%	±%
National	Clarrie Millar	30,699	50.5	−8.6
Labor	Andrew Foley	22,815	37.5	+1.6
Liberal	Cam Primavera	4,616	7.6	+7.6
Democrats	Ray Barry	2,714	4.5	−0.5
Total formal votes		60,844	96.7	
Informal votes		2,072	3.3	
Turnout		62,916	93.7	
Two-party-preferred result
National	Clarrie Millar	35,755	58.8	−3.0
Labor	Andrew Foley	25,087	41.2	+3.0
National hold		Swing	−3.0	

==== 1984 ====
1984 Australian federal election: Wide Bay
Party	Candidate	Votes	%	±%
National	Clarrie Millar	32,656	59.1	+4.2
Labor	Fred Hoberg	19,833	35.9	−2.7
Democrats	Glen Spicer	2,745	5.0	+1.1
Total formal votes		55,234	94.9	
Informal votes		2,942	5.1	
Turnout		58,176	94.4	
Two-party-preferred result
National	Clarrie Millar	34,110	61.8	+3.9
Labor	Fred Hoberg	21,124	38.2	−3.9
National hold		Swing	+3.9	

==== 1983 ====
1983 Australian federal election: Wide Bay
Party	Candidate	Votes	%	±%
National	Clarrie Millar	35,472	48.9	−1.5
Labor	James Finemore	32,362	44.6	+4.2
Democrats	Mervyn Worth	2,850	3.9	−2.8
Progress	Raymond Bird	1,813	2.5	+0.0
Total formal votes		72,497	98.9	
Informal votes		806	1.1	
Turnout		73,303	94.1	
Two-party-preferred result
National	Clarrie Millar	37,602	51.9	−2.5
Labor	James Finemore	34,895	48.1	+2.5
National hold		Swing	−2.5	

==== 1980 ====
1980 Australian federal election: Wide Bay
Party	Candidate	Votes	%	±%
National Country	Clarrie Millar	33,377	50.4	−2.8
Labor	James Finemore	26,708	40.4	+3.6
Democrats	Geoffrey Schuh	4,414	6.7	−3.3
Progress	Raymond Bird	1,675	2.5	+2.5
Total formal votes		66,174	98.5	
Informal votes		997	1.5	
Turnout		67,171	95.3	
Two-party-preferred result
National Country	Clarrie Millar		54.4	−3.8
Labor	James Finemore		45.6	+3.8
National Country hold		Swing	−3.8	

=== Elections in the 1970s ===
==== 1977 ====
1977 Australian federal election: Wide Bay
Party	Candidate	Votes	%	±%
National Country	Clarrie Millar	33,252	53.2	−4.5
Labor	Frederick Faircloth	23,276	36.8	−2.5
Democrats	Douglas Mackenzie	6,321	10.0	+10.0
Total formal votes		63,252	99.0	
Informal votes		637	1.0	
Turnout		63,889	95.9	
Two-party-preferred result
National Country	Clarrie Millar		58.2	−1.1
Labor	Frederick Faircloth		41.8	+1.1
National Country hold		Swing	−1.1	

==== 1975 ====
1975 Australian federal election: Wide Bay
Party	Candidate	Votes	%	±%
National Country	Clarrie Millar	34,143	57.7	+14.0
Labor	Brendan Hansen	23,286	39.3	−6.6
Workers	Gerrit Alberts	1,759	3.0	+3.0
Total formal votes		59,188	99.0	
Informal votes		598	1.0	
Turnout		59,786	96.6	
Two-party-preferred result
National Country	Clarrie Millar		59.3	+5.8
Labor	Brendan Hansen		40.7	−5.8
National Country hold		Swing	+5.8	

==== 1974 ====
1974 Australian federal election: Wide Bay
Party	Candidate	Votes	%	±%
Labor	Brendan Hansen	26,127	45.9	−6.3
Country	Clarrie Millar	24,875	43.7	+1.8
Liberal	Ian Theodore	5,920	10.4	+10.4
Total formal votes		56,922	99.1	
Informal votes		508	0.9	
Turnout		57,430	97.2	
Two-party-preferred result
Country	Clarrie Millar	30,463	53.5	+6.8
Labor	Brendan Hansen	26,459	46.5	−6.8
Country gain from Labor		Swing	+6.8	

==== 1972 ====
1972 Australian federal election: Wide Bay
Party	Candidate	Votes	%	±%
Labor	Brendan Hansen	26,572	52.2	−2.9
Country	George Crawford	21,336	41.9	+0.7
Democratic Labor	Alan Birchley	2,751	5.4	+1.7
National Socialist	Les Leisemann	203	0.4	+0.4
Total formal votes		50,862	98.6	
Informal votes		717	1.4	
Turnout		51,579	96.6	
Two-party-preferred result
Labor	Brendan Hansen		53.3	−2.5
Country	George Crawford		46.7	+2.5
Labor hold		Swing	−2.5	

=== Elections in the 1960s ===
==== 1969 ====
1969 Australian federal election: Wide Bay
Party	Candidate	Votes	%	±%
Labor	Brendan Hansen	27,962	55.1	+7.0
Country	Paul Neville	20,935	41.2	−5.2
Democratic Labor	Laurence Kehoe	1,865	3.7	−1.8
Total formal votes		50,762	99.2	
Informal votes		399	0.8	
Turnout		51,161	96.7	
Two-party-preferred result
Labor	Brendan Hansen		55.8	+6.6
Country	Paul Neville		44.2	−6.6
Labor hold		Swing	+6.6	

==== 1966 ====
1966 Australian federal election: Wide Bay
Party	Candidate	Votes	%	±%
Labor	Brendan Hansen	23,459	54.9	−1.1
Country	Albert White	16,936	39.6	−0.4
Democratic Labor	William Hutchinson	2,347	5.5	+3.2
Total formal votes		42,742	98.3	
Informal votes		739	1.7	
Turnout		43,481	96.7	
Two-party-preferred result
Labor	Brendan Hansen		56.0	−1.3
Country	Albert White		44.0	+1.3
Labor hold		Swing	−1.3	

==== 1963 ====
1963 Australian federal election: Wide Bay
Party	Candidate	Votes	%	±%
Labor	Brendan Hansen	23,182	56.0	+2.6
Country	Albert White	16,568	40.0	−0.1
Democratic Labor	Rogers Judge	935	2.3	−2.0
Social Credit	Geoffrey Nichols	700	1.7	+1.7
Total formal votes		41,385	98.2	
Informal votes		738	1.8	
Turnout		42,123	96.7	
Two-party-preferred result
Labor	Brendan Hansen		57.3	+2.1
Country	Albert White		42.7	−2.1
Labor hold		Swing	+2.1	

==== 1961 ====
1961 Australian federal election: Wide Bay
Party	Candidate	Votes	%	±%
Labor	Brendan Hansen	21,808	53.4	+12.4
Country	Henry Bandidt	16,578	40.6	−7.1
Queensland Labor	Edward McDonnell	1,747	4.3	−7.0
Independent	James Dunn	730	1.8	+1.8
Total formal votes		40,863	98.3	
Informal votes		718	1.7	
Turnout		41,581	96.0	
Two-party-preferred result
Labor	Brendan Hansen		55.2	+9.5
Country	Henry Bandidt		44.8	−9.5
Labor gain from Country		Swing	+9.5	

=== Elections in the 1950s ===
==== 1958 ====
1958 Australian federal election: Wide Bay
Party	Candidate	Votes	%	±%
Country	Henry Bandidt	19,184	47.7	−7.5
Labor	Brendan Hansen	16,498	41.0	−3.8
Queensland Labor	Edward McDonnell	4,526	11.3	+11.3
Total formal votes		40,208	98.3	
Informal votes		697	1.7	
Turnout		40,905	97.0	
Two-party-preferred result
Country	Henry Bandidt	21,815	54.3	−0.9
Labor	Brendan Hansen	18,393	45.7	+0.9
Country hold		Swing	−0.9	

==== 1955 ====
1955 Australian federal election: Wide Bay
Party	Candidate	Votes	%	±%
Country	William Brand	21,859	55.2	+2.4
Labor	Matthew Tallon	17,724	44.8	−1.3
Total formal votes		39,583	98.6	
Informal votes		553	1.4	
Turnout		40,136	96.0	
Country hold		Swing	+1.9	

==== 1954 ====
1954 Australian federal election: Wide Bay
Party	Candidate	Votes	%	±%
Country	William Brand	22,493	54.1	−2.8
Labor	Frank Forde	18,648	44.8	+1.7
Communist	Frank Falls	442	1.1	+1.1
Total formal votes		41,583	99.1	
Informal votes		379	0.9	
Turnout		41,962	97.4	
Two-party-preferred result
Country	William Brand		54.2	−2.7
Labor	Frank Forde		45.8	+2.7
Country hold		Swing	−2.7	

==== 1951 ====
1951 Australian federal election: Wide Bay
Party	Candidate	Votes	%	±%
Country	Bernard Corser	22,895	56.9	+0.4
Labor	Thomas Wallace	17,337	43.1	+15.1
Total formal votes		40,232	98.5	
Informal votes		594	1.5	
Turnout		40,826	97.1	
Country hold		Swing	−7.4	

=== Elections in the 1940s ===
==== 1949 ====
1949 Australian federal election: Wide Bay
Party	Candidate	Votes	%	±%
Country	Bernard Corser	22,037	56.5	+9.0
Labor	Samuel Round	10,941	28.0	−7.9
Independent	Robert McDowell	6,037	15.5	+15.5
Total formal votes		39,015	98.6	
Informal votes		572	1.4	
Turnout		39,587	96.7	
Two-party-preferred result
Country	Bernard Corser		64.3	+8.9
Labor	Samuel Round		35.7	−8.9
Country hold		Swing	+8.9	

==== 1946 ====
1946 Australian federal election: Wide Bay
Party	Candidate	Votes	%	±%
Country	Bernard Corser	31,027	54.3	+1.5
Labor	George Watson	16,071	28.1	−6.6
Services	Eric Paterson	7,866	13.8	+13.8
Communist	Max Julius	2,142	3.8	+3.8
Total formal votes		57,106	98.1	
Informal votes		1,091	1.9	
Turnout		58,197	93.4	
Two-party-preferred result
Country	Bernard Corser		65.1	+8.6
Labor	George Watson		34.9	−8.6
Country hold		Swing	+8.6	

==== 1943 ====
1943 Australian federal election: Wide Bay
Party	Candidate	Votes	%	±%
Country	Bernard Corser	20,662	38.5	−2.1
Labor	George Watson	18,638	34.7	+5.4
Country	James Heading	7,678	14.3	+14.3
Independent	Henry Madden	3,750	7.0	+7.0
Independent	Clive Lambourne	2,988	5.6	+5.6
Total formal votes		53,716	97.7	
Informal votes		1,237	2.3	
Turnout		54,953	95.0	
Two-party-preferred result
Country	Bernard Corser	30,342	56.5	−2.4
Labor	George Watson	23,374	43.5	+2.4
Country hold		Swing	−2.4	

==== 1940 ====
1940 Australian federal election: Wide Bay
Party	Candidate	Votes	%	±%
Country	Bernard Corser	28,693	54.9	+17.1
Labor	Samuel Round	15,305	29.3	+6.7
Protestant Labour	John Rex	8,300	15.9	+15.9
Total formal votes		52,298	98.5	
Informal votes		825	1.5	
Turnout		53,123	94.7	
Two-party-preferred result
Country	Bernard Corser		58.9	+8.4
Labor	Samuel Round		41.1	+41.1
Country hold		Swing	+8.4	

=== Elections in the 1930s ===
==== 1937 ====
1937 Australian federal election: Wide Bay
Party	Candidate	Votes	%	±%
Social Credit	Geoffrey Nichols	20,356	39.6	+27.9
Country	Bernard Corser	19,437	37.8	−15.9
Labor	George Watson	11,644	22.6	−9.8
Total formal votes		51,437	98.2	
Informal votes		942	1.8	
Turnout		52,379	95.5	
Two-party-preferred result
Country	Bernard Corser	25,991	50.5	−9.3
Social Credit	Geoffrey Nichols	25,446	49.5	+49.5
Country hold		Swing	−9.3	

==== 1934 ====
1934 Australian federal election: Wide Bay
Party	Candidate	Votes	%	±%
Country	Bernard Corser	26,254	53.7	−46.3
Labor	George Webb	15,857	32.4	+32.4
Social Credit	Geoffrey Nichols	5,723	11.7	+11.7
Communist	Colin Hennessy	1,085	2.2	+2.2
Total formal votes		48,919	97.6	
Informal votes		1,196	2.4	
Turnout		50,115	95.2	
Two-party-preferred result
Country	Bernard Corser		59.8	−40.2
Labor	George Webb		40.2	+40.2
Country hold		Swing	−40.2	

==== 1931 ====
1931 Australian federal election: Wide Bay
Party	Candidate	Votes	%	±%
Country	Bernard Corser	unopposed		
Country hold		Swing		

=== Elections in the 1920s ===
==== 1929 ====
1929 Australian federal election: Wide Bay
Party	Candidate	Votes	%	±%
Country	Bernard Corser	29,249	67.2	−32.8
Labor	John O'Keefe	14,307	32.8	+32.8
Total formal votes		43,556	95.6	
Informal votes		2,023	4.4	
Turnout		45,59	95.1	
Country hold		Swing	−32.8	

==== 1928 ====
1928 Australian federal election: Wide Bay
Party	Candidate	Votes	%	±%
Country	Bernard Corser	unopposed		
Country hold		Swing		

==== 1928 by-election ====
1928 Wide Bay by-election
Party	Candidate	Votes	%	±%
Country	Bernard Corser	unopposed		
Country gain from Nationalist		Swing		

==== 1925 ====
1925 Australian federal election: Wide Bay
Party	Candidate	Votes	%	±%
Nationalist	Edward Corser	25,877	64.5	+26.1
Labor	Andrew Thompson	14,231	35.5	+1.5
Total formal votes		40,108	96.7	
Informal votes		1,348	3.3	
Turnout		41,456	91.8	
Nationalist hold		Swing	+4.0	

==== 1922 ====
1922 Australian federal election: Wide Bay
Party	Candidate	Votes	%	±%
Nationalist	Edward Corser	13,069	38.4	−20.8
Labor	Joseph Johnston	11,580	34.0	−6.8
Country	James Heading	9,427	27.7	+27.7
Total formal votes		34,076	94.9	
Informal votes		1,830	5.1	
Turnout		35,906	84.1	
Two-party-preferred result
Nationalist	Edward Corser	20,633	60.5	+1.3
Labor	Joseph Johnston	13,443	39.5	−1.3
Nationalist hold		Swing	+1.3	

=== Elections in the 1910s ===
==== 1919 ====
1919 Australian federal election: Wide Bay
Party	Candidate	Votes	%	±%
Nationalist	Edward Corser	16,272	54.3	+1.4
Labor	Frederick Martyn	13,685	45.7	−1.4
Total formal votes		29,957	98.2	
Informal votes		534	1.8	
Turnout		30,491	87.2	
Nationalist hold		Swing	+1.4	

==== 1917 ====
1917 Australian federal election: Wide Bay
Party	Candidate	Votes	%	±%
Nationalist	Edward Corser	15,991	52.9	+52.9
Labor	Frederick Martyn	14,250	47.1	−17.2
Total formal votes		30,241	98.3	
Informal votes		525	1.7	
Turnout		30,766	91.7	
Nationalist hold		Swing	+17.2	

==== 1915 by-election ====
1915 Wide Bay by-election
Party	Candidate	Votes	%	±%
Liberal	Edward Corser	14,027	50.2	+50.2
Labor	Andrew Thompson	13,941	49.8	−14.5
Total formal votes		27,968	99.3	
Informal votes		202	0.7	
Turnout		28,170	82.0	
Liberal gain from Labor		Swing	+14.5	

==== 1914 ====
1914 Australian federal election: Wide Bay
Party	Candidate	Votes	%	±%
Labor	Andrew Fisher	16,494	64.3	+8.7
Queensland Farmers	John Austin	9,155	35.7	+35.7
Total formal votes		25,649	97.0	
Informal votes		788	3.0	
Turnout		26,437	78.1	
Labor hold		Swing	+8.7	

==== 1913 ====
1913 Australian federal election: Wide Bay
Party	Candidate	Votes	%	±%
Labor	Andrew Fisher	15,702	55.6	−3.3
Liberal	Arnold Wienholt	12,543	44.4	+3.3
Total formal votes		28,245	98.4	
Informal votes		464	1.6	
Turnout		28,709	84.0	
Labor hold		Swing	−3.3	

==== 1910 ====
1910 Australian federal election: Wide Bay
Party	Candidate	Votes	%	±%
Labour	Andrew Fisher	12,154	54.1	−0.4
Liberal	Jacob Stumm	10,303	45.9	+0.4
Total formal votes		22,457	98.3	
Informal votes		380	1.7	
Turnout		22,837	71.4	
Labour hold		Swing	−0.4	

=== Elections in the 1900s ===
==== 1906 ====
1906 Australian federal election: Wide Bay
Party	Candidate	Votes	%	±%
Labour	Andrew Fisher	8,118	54.5	−6.7
Anti-Socialist	Jasper Harvey	6,784	45.5	+6.7
Total formal votes		14,902	97.5	
Informal votes		389	2.5	
Turnout		15,291	52.7	
Labour hold		Swing	−6.7	

==== 1903 ====
1903 Australian federal election: Wide Bay
Party	Candidate	Votes	%	±%
Labour	Andrew Fisher	10,622	61.2	+5.8
Protectionist	George Stupart	6,730	38.8	−5.8
Total formal votes		17,352	98.0	
Informal votes		346	2.0	
Turnout		17,698	67.3	
Labour hold		Swing	+5.8	

==== 1901 ====
1901 Australian federal election: Wide Bay
Party	Candidate	Votes	%	±%
Labour	Andrew Fisher	4,910	55.4	+55.4
Protectionist	John Annear	3,955	44.6	+44.6
Total formal votes		8,865	98.6	
Informal votes		122	1.4	
Turnout		8,987	71.2	
Labour win		(new seat)		
