= Electoral results for the district of Burrum =

Queensland, Australia, district election results

This is a list of electoral results for the electoral district of Burrum in Queensland state elections.

== Members for Burrum ==
The following people were elected in the seat of Burrum:

Member	Party	Term
Charles Powers	Opposition	1888–1893
Nicholas Tooth	Ministerial	1893–1902
George Martin	Labor	1902–1905
Colin Rankin	Ministerial	1905–1918
Colin Rankin	Liberal	1905–1918
Albert Whitford	Labor	1918–1920
William Brand	Country	1920–1932
William Brand	CPNP	1920–1932

== Election results ==
=== Elections in the 1920s ===
1929 Queensland state election: Burrum
Party	Candidate	Votes	%	±%
CPNP	William Brand	3,754	60.2	+5.2
Labor	Timothy Hanley	2,479	39.8	−5.2
Total formal votes		6,233	99.4	+0.5
Informal votes		38	0.6	−0.5
Turnout		6,271	92.3	+2.4
CPNP hold		Swing	+5.2	

1926 Queensland state election: Burrum
Party	Candidate	Votes	%	±%
CPNP	William Brand	3,311	55.0	+4.4
Labor	John Laurison	2,713	45.0	−4.4
Total formal votes		6,024	98.9	−0.4
Informal votes		65	1.1	+0.4
Turnout		6,089	89.9	+6.1
CPNP hold		Swing	+4.4	

1923 Queensland state election: Burrum
Party	Candidate	Votes	%	±%
Country	William Brand	2,860	50.6	−7.1
Labor	Montague Parker	2,796	49.4	+7.1
Total formal votes		5,656	99.3	−0.2
Informal votes		37	0.7	+0.2
Turnout		5,693	83.8	+0.6
Country hold		Swing	−7.1	

1920 Queensland state election: Burrum
Party	Candidate	Votes	%	±%
Country	William Brand	2,252	57.7	+57.7
Labor	Albert Whitford	1,652	42.3	−9.3
Total formal votes		3,904	99.5	+1.9
Informal votes		20	0.5	−1.9
Turnout		3,924	83.2	−0.8
Country gain from Labor		Swing	N/A	

=== Elections in the 1910s ===
1918 Queensland state election: Burrum
Party	Candidate	Votes	%	±%
Labor	Albert Whitford	2,060	51.6	+5.0
National	Colin Rankin	1,936	48.4	−5.0
Total formal votes		3,996	97.6	−1.2
Informal votes		100	2.4	+1.2
Turnout		4,096	84.0	−6.4
Labor gain from National		Swing	+5.0	

1915 Queensland state election: Burrum
Party	Candidate	Votes	%	±%
Liberal	Colin Rankin	1,993	53.4	−5.0
Labor	Albert Whitford	1,741	46.6	+5.0
Total formal votes		3,734	98.8	−0.3
Informal votes		46	1.2	+0.3
Turnout		3,780	90.4	+19.1
Liberal hold		Swing	−5.0	

1912 Queensland state election: Burrum
Party	Candidate	Votes	%	±%
Liberal	Colin Rankin	1,623	58.4	
Labor	Albert Whitford	1,157	41.6	
Total formal votes		2,780	99.1	
Informal votes		26	0.9	
Turnout		2,806	71.3	
Liberal hold		Swing		
