= Albert Whitford =

Albert Whitford may refer to:

- Albert Whitford (astronomer) (Albert Edward Whitford, 1905–2002), American physicist and astronomer
- Albert Whitford (politician) (Albert Edward Victor Whitford, 1877–1924), member of the Queensland Legislative Assembly
