= Pialba Shire Council =

The Pialba Shire Council was a local government in Queensland, Australia that existed from 1905 to 1917.

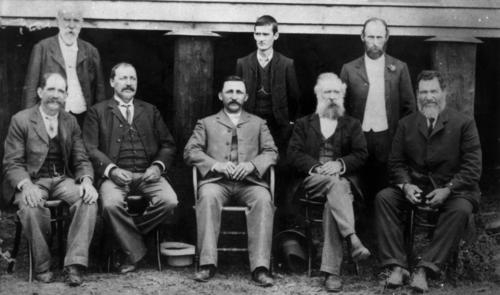
Pialba Shire Council in 1907

The council's headquarters, the Pialba Shire Hall, is now known as the Pialba Memorial Hall, and is on the Fraser Coast Local Heritage Register.

The council had two divisions which each elected three councillors. The six councillors then elected their chairman, the first of whom was Hans Fevre.

In August 1905 the council appointed its first Shire Clerk, Nicholas Tooth, a former MP and Mayor of the neighboring Maryborough council.

The later years of the council’s existence coincided with the construction of the Urangan Pier (1913-1917). The connection between the histories and legacies of the council and the Urangan Pier is the subject of the book Pialba and the Pier by Fraser Coast Mayor George Seymour.

The final meeting of the Pialba Shire Council was held on 4 April 1917. The area of the Pialba Shire Council was then grouped together with the area of the also abolished Howard Shire Council and part of the abolished Antigua Shire Council as well as part of the Maryborough City Council to form the new Burrum Shire Council (which covered a different area to the Burrum Shire Council that existed prior to 1905).
