= Brooklyn House, Howard =

Coordinates: 25.3140°S 152.5652°E

Brooklyn House is a heritage-listed residence at 23 William Street, Howard, Fraser Coast Region, Queensland, Australia.

It is associated with Member of the Queensland Legislative Assembly Colin Rankin and his daughter Australian Senator Annabelle Rankin.
