= Annabelle Rankin =

Australian politician

The Honourable Dame Annabelle Rankin DBE
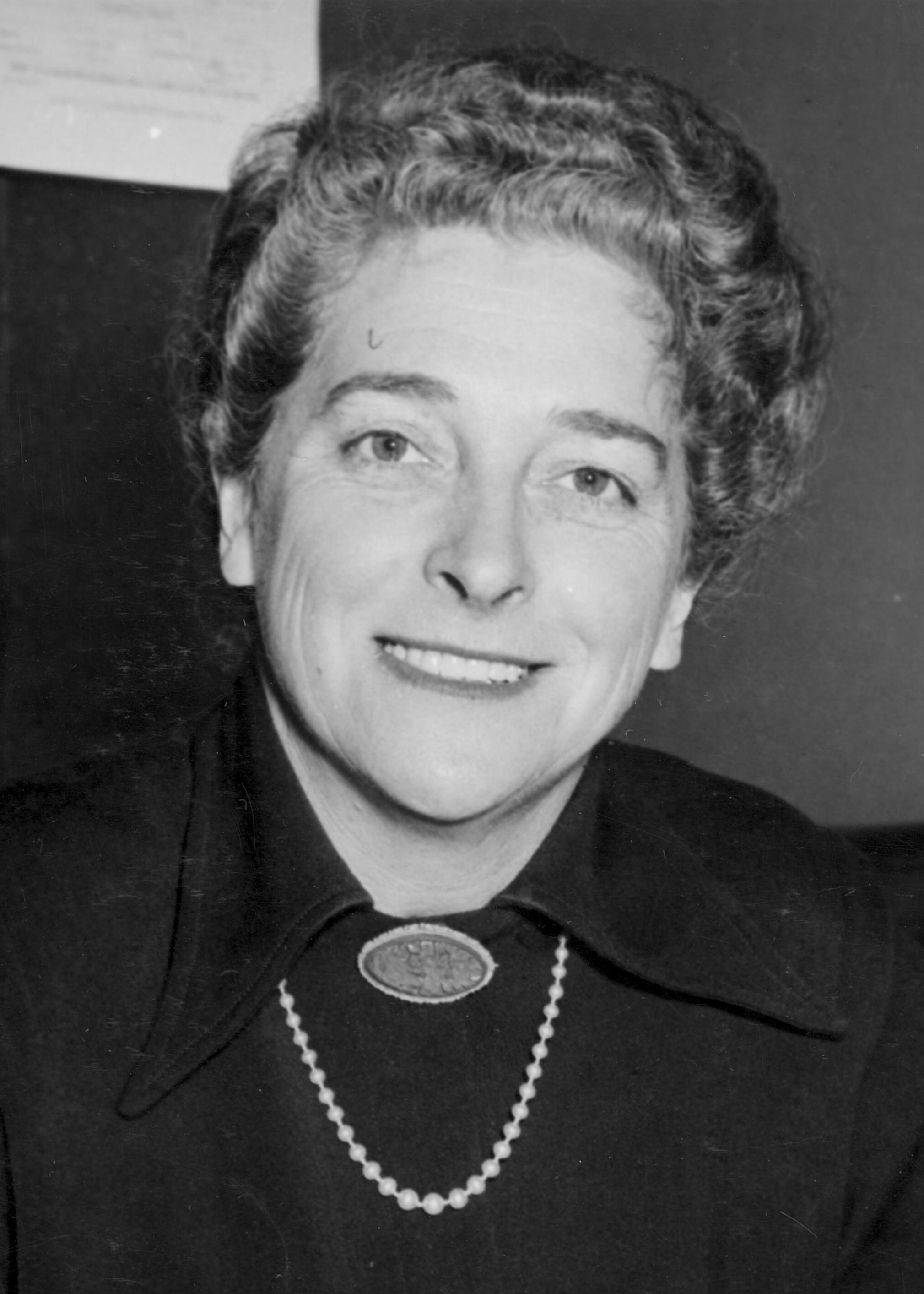

High Commissioner of Australia to New Zealand
- In office 18 March 1971 – 12 June 1974
- Prime Minister: William McMahon; Gough Whitlam
- Preceded by: Ted Hicks
- Succeeded by: Brian Clarence Hill

Minister for Housing
- In office 26 January 1966 – 22 March 1971
- Prime Minister: Harold Holt; John McEwen; John Gorton; William McMahon
- Preceded by: Les Bury
- Succeeded by: Kevin Cairns

Government Whip in the Senate
- In office 11 June 1951 – 8 March 1966
- Prime Minister: Robert Menzies
- Preceded by: Reg Wright
- Succeeded by: Malcolm Scott

Senator for Queensland
- In office 1 July 1947 – 24 May 1971
- Succeeded by: Neville Bonner

Personal details
- Born: Annabelle Jane Mary Rankin; 28 July 1908 South Brisbane, Queensland, Australia
- Died: 30 August 1986 (aged 78) South Brisbane, Queensland, Australia
- Party: Liberal
- Relations: Colin Rankin (father)

Dame Annabelle Jane Mary Rankin DBE (28 July 1908 – 30 August 1986) was an Australian politician and diplomat. She was the first woman from Queensland elected to parliament, the first woman federal departmental minister, and the first Australian woman to be appointed head of a foreign mission.

Rankin was born in Brisbane, the daughter of state MP Colin Rankin. A member of the Liberal Party, she was elected to the Senate at the 1946 federal election, taking her seat the following year. She was the second woman elected to the Senate, after Dorothy Tangney. Rankin was the Liberal Party's chief whip from 1947 to 1950 and from 1951 to 1966; she remains the longest-serving whip in the party's history, in either chamber of parliament. In 1966, she was made Minister for Housing in the Holt government, becoming the first woman to hold a ministerial portfolio. She held that position until her retirement from politics in 1971. As High Commissioner to New Zealand from 1971 to 1974, she was the first woman to head an Australian mission overseas.

== Early life ==
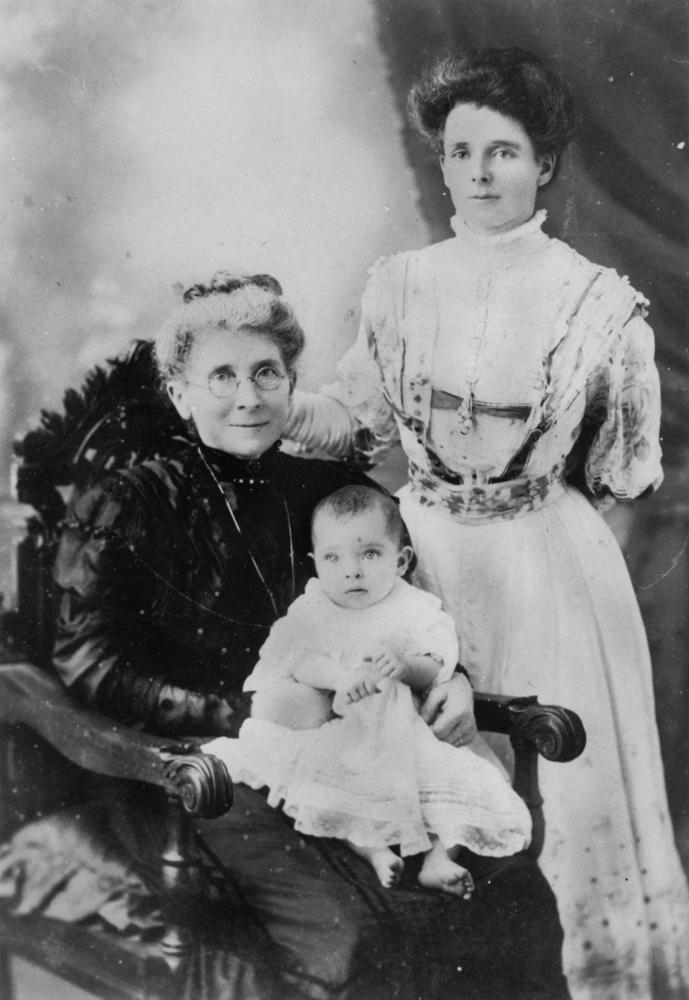
Rankin as a small child, with her mother and grandmother

Rankin was born on 28 July 1908 in South Brisbane, Queensland. She was the older of two daughters born to Annabelle Davidson Rankin (née Thomson) and Colin Dunlop Wilson Rankin. Her father, born in Scotland, was a sugar grower and Boer War veteran who served in the Queensland Legislative Assembly (1905–1918).

Rankin grew up on her father's sugarcane farm on the Isis River near the small town of Childers. In 1919, her father replaced his deceased brother as managing director of Queensland Collieries Company, necessitating a move to Howard. The family lived in Brooklyn House, which is now heritage-listed. Rankin attended the local state schools in Childers and Howard before completing her education as a boarder at the Glennie Memorial School in Toowoomba.

As an unmarried woman from a wealthy family, Rankin was not expected to enter the workforce. She involved herself in various community organisations, teaching Sunday school and founding a local unit of the Girl Guides. She was encouraged by her father to travel overseas, visiting China and Japan soon after leaving school. She visited Europe in 1936, working in the slums of London and with refugees from the Spanish Civil War; while in Gibraltar she witnessed the bombing of La Línea de la Concepción.

After her father's death in 1940, Rankin began working as a clerk for the Union Trustee Company of Australia. She was the commandant of a Brisbane-based Voluntary Aid Detachment during the war. She was also state secretary of the Girl Guides in 1942 and assistant state commissioner of the Young Women's Christian Association (YWCA) the following year. She was responsible for the organisation's work around the welfare of servicewomen, in which capacity she travelled to military bases in North Queensland. In 1946, she was offered a position in Greece with the United Nations Relief and Rehabilitation Administration, but declined in order to enter politics in Australia.

== Politics ==
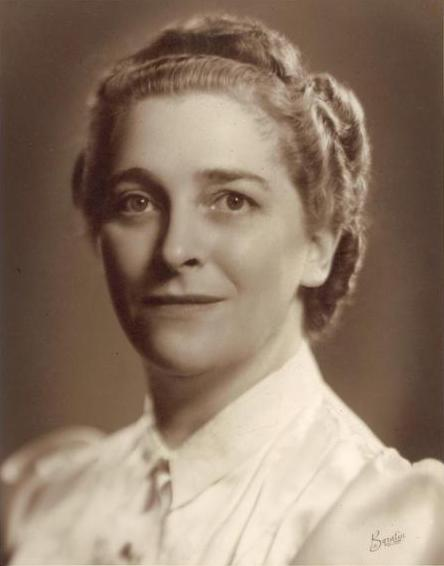
Rankin in the 1940s

In July 1946, Rankin won preselection for the Senate on the ticket of the Queensland People's Party, the contemporary state affiliate of the Liberal Party. Her selection ended the political career of Senate veteran Harry Foll. Rankin's first campaign speech in Maryborough reportedly "attracted one of the largest crowds ever to attend a political meeting in that town, the number including almost twice as many women as men". At the 1946 federal election she was elected to a term beginning in July 1947. She was the first Queensland woman elected to federal parliament, the second woman elected to the Senate after Dorothy Tangney, and the second woman from the Liberal Party elected to federal parliament after Enid Lyons.

Due to consecutive landslide defeats and the block voting system in use at the time, the Coalition between the Liberal Party and Country Party was left with only three senators after the 1946 election, all from Queensland. Walter Cooper became Leader of the Opposition in the Senate with Neil O'Sullivan as his deputy. Rankin became the Opposition Whip, the first woman to serve as a whip in federal parliament. Because of these very low numbers, the duties of the whip's position were virtually non-existent. This led to one commentator remarking: "Senator Rankin should have an easy job, unless the Leader and Deputy-Leader fall down on theirs".

Rankin was a prominent member of the Australian Women's Movement Against Socialisation (AWMAS), formed by Millicent Preston-Stanley to oppose the Chifley government's proposed nationalisation of the banks.

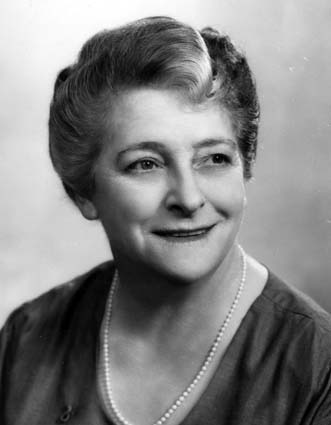
Rankin in 1967

On 26 January 1966, Prime Minister Harold Holt appointed her Minister for Housing in his first ministry, responsible for the Department of Housing. She was the second woman to reach ministerial rank in the Federal Parliament. She resigned from the Senate in 1971 and was made High Commissioner to New Zealand, a post she held to 1974. Following her retirement she returned to Brisbane where she continued to be involved in voluntary organisations.

Rankin is the first woman to be Mother of the Senate, an informal title given to the senator with the longest continuous service. She held the title from 1968 to her retirement in 1971, together with Fathers of the Senate Justin O’Byrne and Bert Hendrickson.

== Death ==
Rankin died in Brisbane aged 78, on 30 August 1986. She was cremated following a State funeral at St John's Anglican Cathedral in Brisbane.

== Honours ==
Annabelle Rankin was appointed a Dame Commander of the Order of the British Empire (DBE) on 13 June 1957 for political and public services. In 1977 Rankin was made a Life Member of the Queensland Branch of the Children's Book Council of Australia.

== Legacy ==
The Electoral Division of Rankin, which came into effect at the 1984 election, is named in her honour. The Dame Annabelle Rankin Award was inaugurated by the Queensland Branch of the Children's Book Council of Australia in her memory.

== See also ==
- List of the first women holders of political offices in Oceania

== Notes ==
Political offices
Preceded by Les Bury	Minister for Housing; 1966–1971	Succeeded by Kevin Cairns
Diplomatic posts
Preceded by Ted Hicks	Australian High Commissioner to New Zealand; 1971 – 1974	Succeeded by Brian Clarence Hill
