= Eskdale, Maryborough =

Eskdale
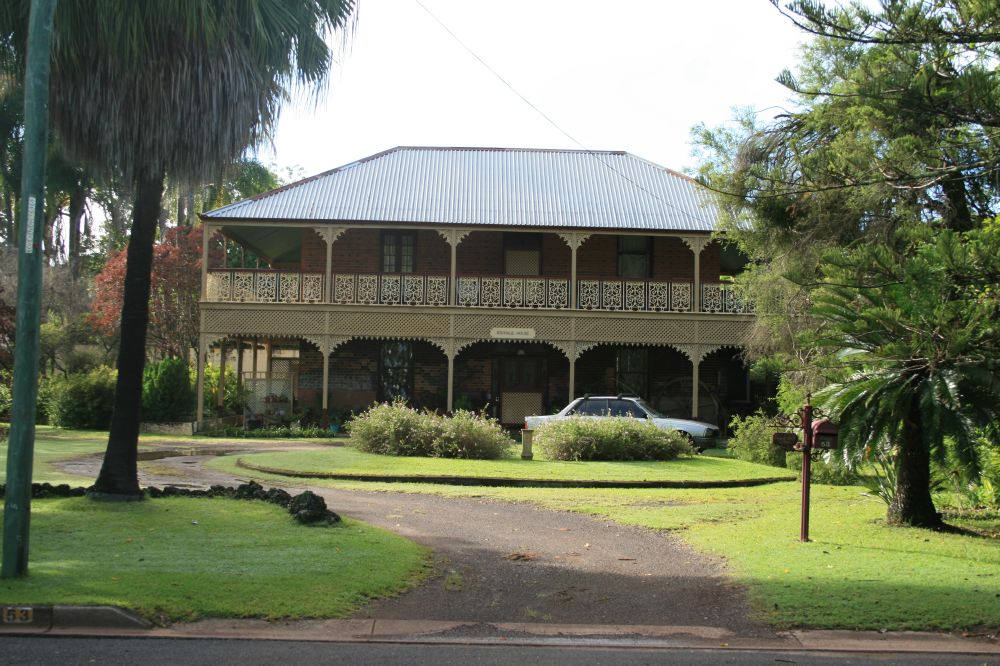
- Eskdale, from NW, 2009

- Location within Queensland Location within Australia
- 25.5381°S 152.6879°E
- Location: 53 Pallas Street, Maryborough, Fraser Coast Region, Queensland, Australia

History
- Design period: 1840s–1860s (mid-19th century)
- Built: c. 1864–1920s
- Built for: James Dowzer

Site notes
- Architectural styles: Victorian Filigree, Queenslander

Queensland Heritage Register
- Official name: Eskdale
- Type: state heritage (built, landscape)
- Designated: 21 October 1992
- Reference no.: 600706
- Significant period: 1860s–1920s (fabric, historical)
- Significant components: pathway/walkway, carriage way/drive, residential accommodation – main house, tank – water (underground), garden – bed/s, trees/plantings, lawn/s, conservatory / glasshouse / greenhouse, service wing, garden/grounds, lead light/s, garden edging/balustrades/planter boxes

Eskdale is a heritage-listed detached house at 53 Pallas Street, Maryborough, Fraser Coast Region, Queensland, Australia. It was built from c. 1864 to 1920s. It was added to the Queensland Heritage Register on 21 October 1992.

== History ==
Eskdale was constructed in about 1864 for the Mayor of Maryborough, James Dowzer. A tender notice in the Maryborough Chronicle of 22 August 1864 reads: 'Tenders are require on or before the 24th instant for the Brick and Stone Work of a Twelve-roomed House - Plans and specifications to be seen at Messrs Dowzer & Purser's.' No architect is specified and it is likely that Dowzer designed the house himself.

The original township of Maryborough was situated, not in its current place, but on the north of the Mary River, after wharves were established in 1847–8 providing transport for wool from sheep stations on the Burnett River. In 1850 Surveyor, Hugh Roland Labatt arrived in Maryborough with instructions to "examine the River Mary...to suggest ...the best site or sites for the laying out of the town, having regard to the convenience of shipping on one hand and internal communication on the other...also...point out the spots desirable as reserves for public building, church, quay and for places for public recreation." The site recommended by Labatt was not where settlement was established but further east and from the early 1850s this is where the growing town developed.

James Dowzer and John Pursers both of Maryborough purchased Suburban Allotment 2 of Section 45, measuring five acres according to a New South Wales land purchase order. This was the land on which James Dowzer constructed a large two storeyed brick house as his residence, later known as Eskdale. Tenders were called in the Maryborough Chronicle for the brick and stone work of a 12 roomed house. It is thought that Dowzer designed his own residence as he is thought to have also designed the Church of England rectory in 1856.

Dowzer was born in 1826 at Clongall, County of Carlow, Ireland. In March 1853 he sailed for Queensland aboard the John Fielden and initially gained an appointment in the Ipswich Police Force. After leaving Ipswich, he arrived in Maryborough in November 1854 where he established a local business as a saddler and storekeeper in the fledgling town. He continued in business until about 1865, and was elected as the third Mayor of Maryborough in 1862. Little documentary evidence has been discovered about the origin of Eskdale, although 1864 seems to be the year in which it was built. Clay was apparently carried to the site and bricks were made at the rear of the property. Hand made iron nails were used in the construction of the European beech floor, and hand made brass nails were used in the construction of the doors. Internal joinery was made using local cedar.

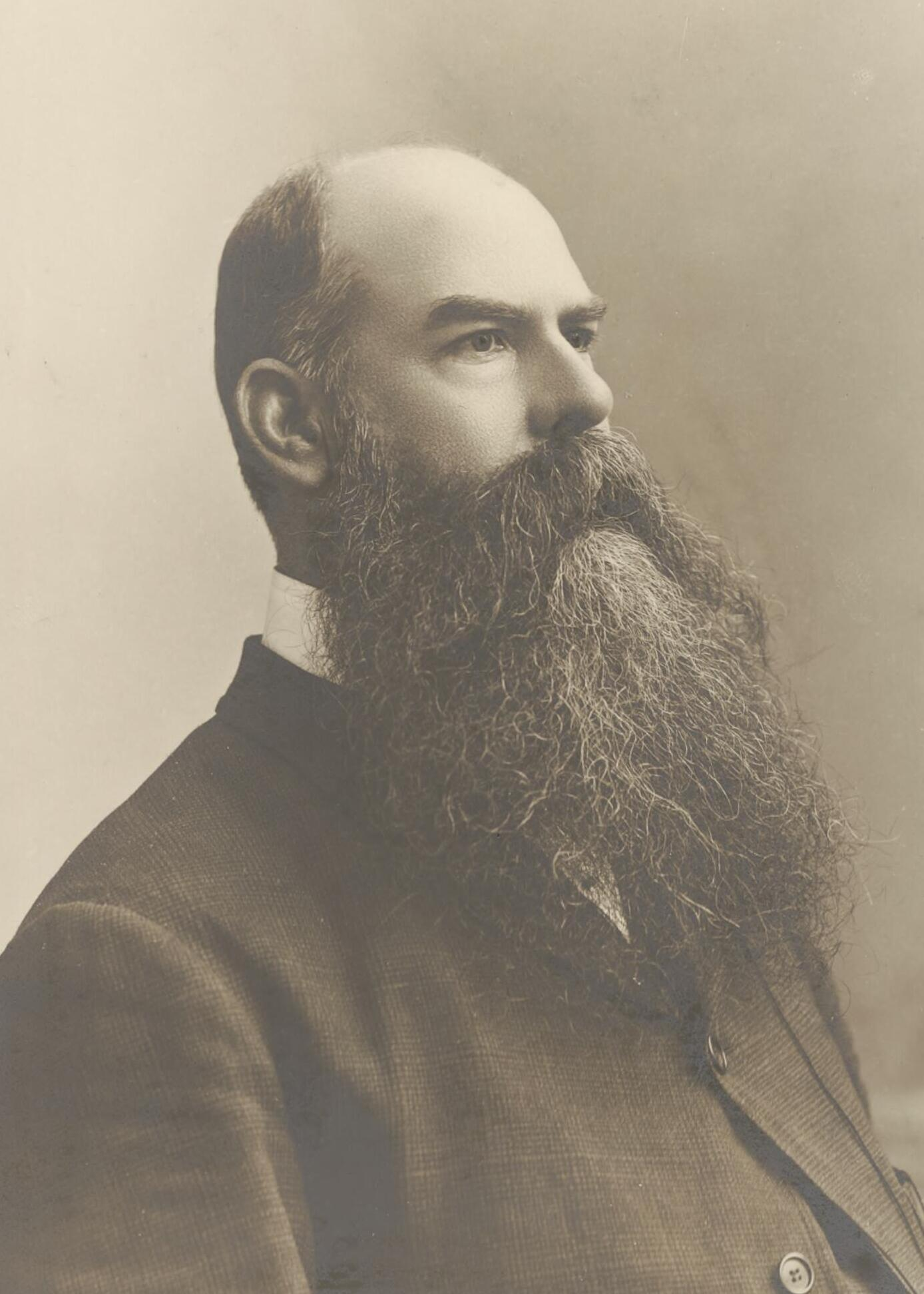
Edward Bernard Corser, circa 1910

In 1868 James Dowzer retired to a dairy farm near Tiaro and Eskdale was acquired by solicitor Edward Corser, who had arrived in Brisbane in 1863 and moved to Maryborough the following year. The house was reportedly not yet finished when the Corser family moved in, and they named it as a reminder of Eskdale in the Lake District of Northern England. Corser died in 1874, and his son, Edward Bernard Corser, inherited the property. E. B. Corser was a prominent local merchant, establishing the business of Corser and Co., and later a successful politician, serving in both the Legislative Assembly of Queensland and Australian House of Representatives.

E. B. Corser died at home at Eskdale while still a serving federal MP in 1928, and Eskdale was transferred to one of his sons, Edward Stewart Corser. E. S. Corser retained ownership until 1961, and it remained in the Corser family until October 1975 when it was bought by Peter and Jacqueline Holtorf.

The Holtorfs used the residence as their family home until 1999 when they converted the house into a Bed and Breakfast. The original section of the house has been authentically restored and is used for guests.

The house originally stood on five acres of land on which there were three tennis courts, stables and gymnasium all of which were demolished due to subdivision. Of the original property the following buildings (apart from Eskdale House) are still in existence: 345 Ann Street (Stewart Corser's House – 'Charlcombe'), 352 Ann Street (The Gardener's Residence) and 47 Pallas Street (Herbert Corser's house – now 'Rhymney House').

A number of changes have also been made to the house itself. The lead light windows were installed around 1920 along with the pressed metal ceilings. The original roof was slate and the verandah roof was iron with alternate red and white panels. The slate roof was destroyed by a hail storm in 1966 and at the time the three chimney stacks were demolished to roof level, so that a new iron roof could cover them. The verandah roof pitch was also made steeper, so that the iron panels could be placed in a straight line.

The decorative cast iron baluster panels on the upper level of the verandahs were likely to have been designed and manufactured in Maryborough. This particular design used on Eskdale is featured in Brian Turner's book, Australia's Iron Lace (p 97), and is referred to as "Maryborough iron lace patterns". A foundry had operated in Maryborough from 1909 until 1981 run by the Daniels family and it '...produced cast iron panels of its own regional design.'

== Description ==
Eskdale is a substantial two storeyed brick house with stone foundations located on Pallas Street, Maryborough facing another early Maryborough house, Oonooraba, at 50 Pallas Street. The house demonstrates the principal characteristics of the Colonial Georgian style of architecture which is noted for its gentle symmetry and simple rectangular shapes with conservative detailing.

The external walls of 18-inch (460 mm) thick brick in English bond construction. The building has a hipped roof clad with corrugated iron sheeting. The house is lined on three sides with wide verandahs on both levels. The verandahs are incorporated under the main roof of the building and are supported on single stop chamfered timber posts with decorative cast iron brackets and, on the upper floor, cast iron balustrade panels. A valance of lattice marks the first floor level on the face of the verandah. The front facade of the building is symmetrically arranged and two large timber sash windows flank a central doorway framing double timber doors.

The front entrance leads into a hall with a central arch way and stairway. The walls are painted a soft green with decorative stencils lining the cornices and chair rails. The stencils have been reproduced from late 19th century styles. The front door is framed by lead-light windows, a fanlight above and rectangular panels on either side as well as two panels in the door itself. Another lead-light window is visible on the landing of the first flight of stairs. The hall leads off to rooms on either side and then through to an extension at the rear.

The hall with archway and interior decoration is replicated on the upper floor in the same position. The door to the front verandah has a simple fanlight with textured glass and features a green shamrock at the base of the window. All joists, cross bracing, lintels, doors, architraves and the staircase are of local red cedar.

On the northern side of the ground floor hall is a large living room. The wide timber (hoop pine) floor boards are exposed and polished, the walls rendered and painted dark red and the ceiling is lined with decorative pressed metal of the 1920s era. There are two doors accessing the hall at either end of the room. A large timber-framed sash window faces onto the front verandah and two similar windows line the northern side of the room facing the side verandah. This fenestration pattern also occurs in the rooms on the southern side of the house. A large fireplace with timber manell-piece is located in the centre of the rear wall.

On the other side of the hall is the dining room at the front and the kitchen at the rear. The dining room contains built-in bookcases of cedar with glass panel doors.

The house is set in established gardens with mature trees and still features some of the early outdoor structures and landscapes. The circular driveway at the front of the house is marked by the raised circular lawn with lantana hedge. Evidence of the former sweep of the driveway can be seen in the slight depression of the grounds to the north-west of the house. A landscaped garden on the northern side of the house consists of geometric garden beds set in concrete with concrete paths dating from about 1915. This area is lined by mature palms along its rear edge. A shed stands a short distance to the rear of this garden and includes some 19th century decoration, namely cast iron brackets. This was once the glass house and now stands as a timber-framed structure with weatherboard cladding and a corrugated iron roof. There is also an underground brick water tank, 20 feet (6.1 m) deep, the top of which is visible on the back lawn. This water tank is fed by another tank in the centre of the roof of the house not visible from the ground. This roof tank catches the rain water which is then diverted into the underground tank. Similar tank constructions can be seen at nearby Baddow House and they date from the time of construction.

== Heritage listing ==
Eskdale was listed on the Queensland Heritage Register on 21 October 1992 having satisfied the following criteria.

The place is important in demonstrating the evolution or pattern of Queensland's history.

Eskdale, a substantial two storeyed brick house dating from about 1864, demonstrates the growth of Maryborough in the 1860s, after new wealth was generated by the nearby Gympie goldfields. It also reflects the trend of pioneering individuals who established themselves as community leaders in early townships to build residences reflective of their social status.

The place is important in demonstrating the principal characteristics of a particular class of cultural places.

The building is an intact example of a substantial 1860s two-storeyed residence in regional Queensland. The surrounding grounds and its various structures and landscapes are also important in demonstrating the design and workings of an early Queensland regional residence.

The place is important because of its aesthetic significance.

The building has aesthetic value as a substantial residence with attractive decorative features and balanced design, within a garden setting.

The place has a special association with the life or work of a particular person, group or organisation of importance in Queensland's history.

Eskdale has special associations with both James Dowzer and Edward Bernard Corser who are of importance to Queensland's history.
