= Division of Wide Bay =

Australian federal electoral division

Coordinates: 25.913°S 152.559°E

Wide Bay Australian House of Representatives Division
- Interactive map of boundaries since the 2019 federal election
- Created: 1901
- MP: Llew O'Brien
- Party: National (Note: Member of the Liberal National Party of Queensland sitting with the federal parliamentary National Party.)
- Namesake: Wide Bay, Queensland
- Electors: 123,237 (2025)
- Area: 14,227 km^{2} (5,493.1 sq mi)
- Demographic: Rural and provincial

The Division of Wide Bay is an Australian electoral division in the state of Queensland. The current MP is Llew O'Brien of the National Party.

== Geography ==
Since 1984, federal electoral division boundaries in Australia have been determined at redistributions by a redistribution committee appointed by the Australian Electoral Commission. Redistributions occur for the boundaries of divisions in a particular state, and they occur every seven years, or sooner if a state's representation entitlement changes or when divisions of a state are malapportioned.

== History ==
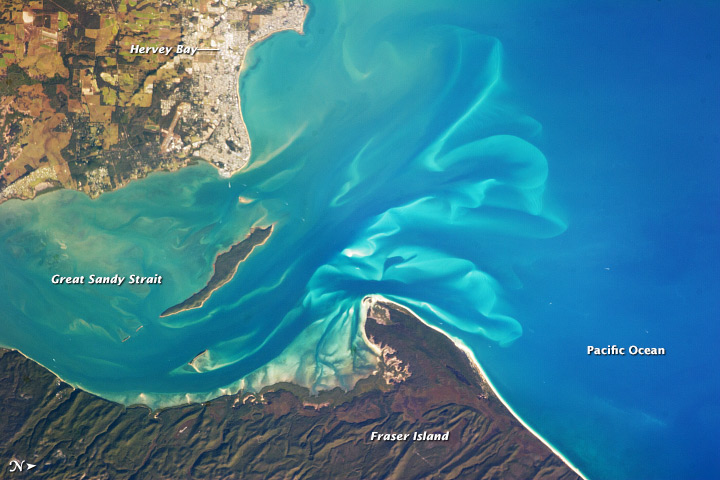
Wide Bay, a region in Queensland from which the division takes its name

The division was proclaimed in 1900, and was one of the original 65 divisions to be contested at the first federal election. Wide Bay is located in south east Queensland and includes the cities of Maryborough, Gympie, Noosa, all of K'gari (formerly Fraser Island), and inland areas extending west to Murgon.

Notable representatives have included three time Prime Minister Andrew Fisher, who was the seat's first member. However, it has been a conservative seat for most of its history; only one other Labor member has ever won it. Warren Truss, former leader of the National Party and Deputy Prime Minister of Australia, held the seat from 1990 to 2016.

== Members ==
Image	Member	Party	Term	Notes
	Andrew Fisher (1862–1928)	Labor	30 March 1901 – 26 October 1915	Previously held the Legislative Assembly of Queensland seat of Gympie. Served as minister under Watson. Served as Opposition Leader from 1909 to 1910, and from 1913 to 1914. Served as Prime Minister from 1908 to 1909, 1910 to 1913 and 1914 to 1915. Resigned to become the High Commissioner to the United Kingdom
	Edward Corser (1852–1928)	Liberal	11 December 1915 – 17 February 1917	Previously held the Legislative Assembly of Queensland seat of Maryborough. Died in office. Son was Bernard Corser
	Edward Corser (1852–1928)	Nationalist	17 February 1917 – 31 July 1928	Previously held the Legislative Assembly of Queensland seat of Maryborough. Died in office. Son was Bernard Corser
	Bernard Corser (1882–1967)	Country	3 September 1928 – 21 April 1954	Previously held the Legislative Assembly of Queensland seat of Burnett. Retired. Father was Edward Corser
	William Brand (1888–1979)	Country	29 May 1954 – 14 October 1958	Previously held the Legislative Assembly of Queensland seat of Isis. Retired
	Henry Bandidt (1906–1990)	Country	22 November 1958 – 9 December 1961	Lost seat
	Brendan Hansen (1922–1999)	Labor	9 December 1961 – 18 May 1974	Served as Chief Government Whip in the House under Whitlam. Lost seat. Later elected to the Legislative Assembly of Queensland seat of Maryborough in 1977
	Clarrie Millar (1925–2017)	Country	18 May 1974 – 2 May 1975	Retired
	Clarrie Millar (1925–2017)	National Country	2 May 1975 – 16 October 1982	Retired
	Clarrie Millar (1925–2017)	Nationals	16 October 1982 – 19 February 1990	Retired
	Warren Truss (1948–)	Nationals	24 March 1990 – 9 May 2016	Served as minister under Howard, Abbott and Turnbull. Served as Deputy Prime Minister under Abbott and Turnbull. Retired
	Llew O'Brien (1972–)	Nationals	2 July 2016 – 10 February 2020	Incumbent
	Llew O'Brien (1972–)	Liberal National (Note: O'Brien left the Nationals partyroom on 10 February 2020, but did not sit as an independent and continued to support the Coalition government. He was readmitted to the Nationals partyroom on 7 December 2020.)	10 February 2020 – 7 December 2020	Incumbent
	Llew O'Brien (1972–)	National	7 December 2020 – present	Incumbent

== Election results ==
2025 Australian federal election: Wide Bay
Party	Candidate	Votes	%	±%
Liberal National	Llew O'Brien	41,055	39.08	−4.39
Labor	Elliott Chalmers	27,271	25.96	+4.70
One Nation	Chad Burgess	12,646	12.04	+1.84
Greens	Emma Buhse	9,080	8.64	−0.86
Family First	Kirsti Kenningale	5,394	5.13	+5.13
Independent	Casey Iddon	5,090	4.84	+4.84
Trumpet of Patriots	Gabrial Pennicott	4,522	4.30	+3.78
Total formal votes		105,058	95.54	+1.96
Informal votes		4,908	4.46	−1.96
Turnout		109,966	89.29	+0.60
Two-party-preferred result
Liberal National	Llew O'Brien	60,546	57.63	−3.71
Labor	Elliott Chalmers	44,512	42.37	+3.71
Liberal National hold		Swing	−3.71	
