= Colin Rankin =

Australian politician (1869–1940)

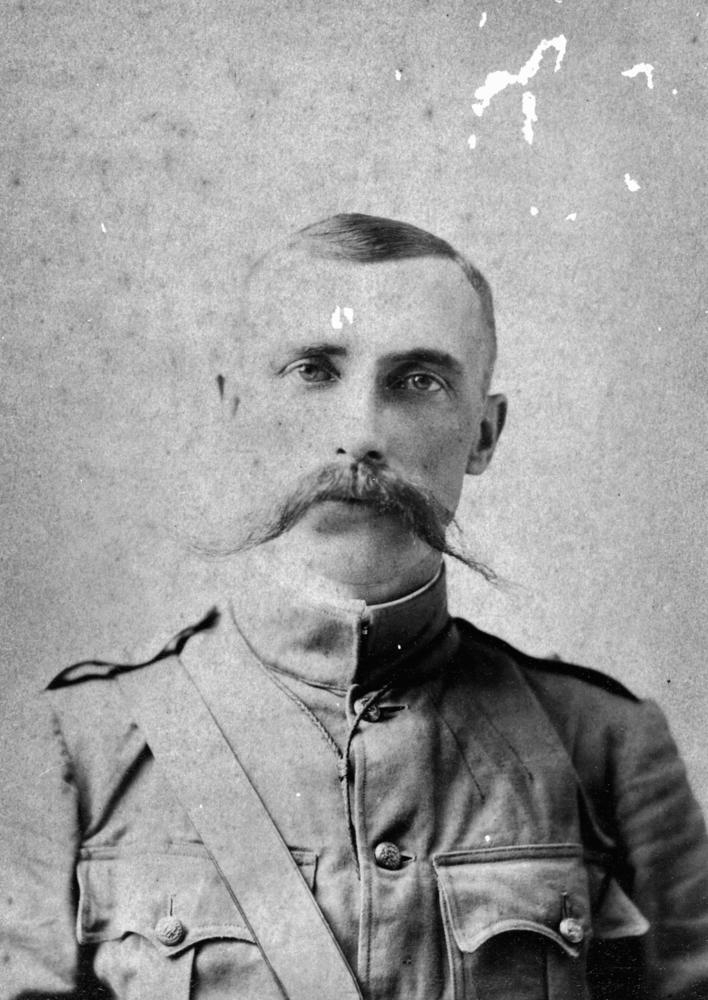

Member of the Queensland Legislative Assembly for Burrum
- In office 17 June 1905 – 16 March 1918
- Preceded by: George Martin
- Succeeded by: Albert Whitford

Personal details
- Born: 20 January 1869 Galston, Ayrshire, Scotland
- Died: 2 November 1940 (aged 71) Brisbane, Queensland, Australia
- Resting place: Howard Cemetery
- Party: Ministerial
- Other party: Kidstonites, Liberals, Opposition
- Spouse: Annabelle Davidson Thompson (m. 1906)
- Children: Dame Annabelle Rankin
- Occupation: Soldier, sugarcane farmer, Company director

Military service
- Branch/service: Queensland Defence Force; Citizen Military Forces
- Years of service: 1886–1917
- Rank: Colonel
- Commands: 11th Brigade (1916); Wide Bay Infantry Regiment (1906–14)
- Battles/wars: Second Boer War; First World War
- Awards: Colonial Auxiliary Forces Officers' Decoration

Colin Dunlop Wilson Rankin, VD (20 January 1869 – 2 November 1940) was a Scottish-born Australian soldier, politician, cane farmer and company director.

== Early life ==
Colin Dunlop Wilson Rankin was born on 20 January 1869 at Galston, Ayrshire, Scotland, the second son of William Rankin, colliery manager, and his wife Jane, née Anderson. He was educated at Galston Public School and Kilmarnock Academy.

Rankin accompanied his family to Queensland when his father became manager of the Queensland Collieries Co. Ltd. at Howard (near Maryborough) in 1884. Rankin joined its staff and from 1886 the Queensland Defence Force. By 1890 he was assistant company manager, grew sugar at Tigh-na-Bienne at Isis, Queensland (near Bundaberg, north of Howard), and became a clerk and valuator with the Isis Divisional Board (1890–1899).

== Family life ==
Rankin married Annabelle Davidson Thomson on 5 September 1906 at St Stephen's Presbyterian Church, Maryborough; they settled on his plantation. They had two daughters, Annabelle (born 1908) and Jean. Annabelle became the first woman to enter the Parliament of Australia from Queensland.

The family lived in Brooklyn House in Howard (now heritage-listed).

== Boer War ==
A major when the South African War broke out, Rankin volunteered for service and on 13 January 1900 sailed with the Second Queensland Contingent. He was appointed second-in-command of the First Australian Regiment of Mounted Infantry and saw action at Diamond Hill, Riet Vlei and elsewhere. Invalided to England, Rankin returned to Queensland in March 1901. In 1903 he was promoted lieutenant colonel of the Wide Bay Infantry Regiment, assuming command in 1906.

== Politics ==
Rankin tried to enter the Queensland Legislative Assembly by contesting the Burrum in the 1899 Queensland colonial election.

When the Shire of Howard was formed in 1903, he was elected as a council member and as shire chairman.

In the 1904 election, Rankin stood unsuccessfully again in Burrum.

On 14 May 1905, George Martin, the Labour member for Burrum, died. Standing as an independent candidate, Rankin won the resulting by-election on 17 June 1905 and entered the Queensland Legislative Assembly. He held the seat through the 1907, 1908, 1909, 1912, and 1915 state elections.

Rankin promoted rural interests during his thirteen years in parliament. He became a council-member of the Australian Sugar Producers' Union. His membership of the Farmers' Parliamentary Union (Country Liberal Party from 1913), however, exacerbated disunity among government ranks. After unsuccessfully challenging Denham's leadership, Rankin was Secretary for Railways from 6 April 1915 to 1 June 1915, and then became deputy leader of the Liberal Opposition when Labor won the May election.

His time in the legislative assembly when he lost Burrum in the 1918 Queensland state election on 16 March 1918 to Labour candidate Albert Whitford.

== First World War ==
During the First World War Rankin served briefly in 1915 with the Australian Imperial Force in Egypt before appointment to command the 11th Brigade in the newly formed 3rd Division, as temporary brigadier general from 1 May 1916. On Salisbury Plain in England, he was dismissed by Major General John Monash as "incapable". He returned home in November, and retired with the honorary rank of colonel in February 1917.

== Later life ==
In 1919, when his brother, William Charles Rankin, died he succeeded him as general manager of the Queensland Collieries.

As managing director in 1924–1940, Rankin continued a tradition of paternal despotism. He had found the company in poor shape with a falling output and inadequate coal reserves; charges have also been made of 'intense exploitation, sub-standard conditions and hard-fistedness'. He courageously took out new leases in the Burrum district and opened new mines which helped the company to weather the Depression of the 1930s.

Rankin died in a private hospital in Brisbane on 2 November 1940, survived by his wife and two daughters, and was buried with Anglican rites in Howard Cemetery. One of his daughters, Annabelle Rankin, later served as a senator in federal parliament between 1947 and 1971.

== Bibliography ==
- Murray, P.L. (1911). "Official Records of the Australian Military Contingents to the War in South Africa". Melbourne: Albert J. Mullett, Government Printer.
- W. J. E. Watson, 100 Years in Coal (Maryborough, 1963)
- E. Ross, A History of the Miners' Federation of Australia (Sydney, 1970)
- D. J. Murphy, T. J. Ryan (Brisbane, 1975)
- W. Browne, A Woman of Distinction (Brisbane, 1981)
- R. L. Whitmore, Coal in Queensland (Brisbane, 1985)
- P. Thomas, The Coalminers of Queensland, Volume 1 (Ipswich, 1986)
- Queensland Government Mining Journal, 15 November 1940, p. 284
- Queensland Times (Ipswich), 3 September 1907, 18 February 1910
- Queenslander, 15 September 1906, 27 December 1913, 20 August 1915, 17 May 1919, 13 December 1919
- Brisbane Sunday Mail, 3 November 1940
- State Library of Queensland
- Raymond L. Whitmore, "Rankin, Colin Dunlop Wilson (1869–1940)", Australian Dictionary of Biography, Volume 11, Melbourne University Press, 1988, pp. 330–331.

Parliament of Queensland
Preceded by George Martin	Member for Burrum; 1905–1918	Succeeded by Albert Whitford
