= George Martin (Queensland politician) =

Australian politician (1858–1905)

Member of the Queensland Legislative Assembly for Burrum
- In office 11 March 1902 – 14 May 1905
- Preceded by: Nicholas Tooth
- Succeeded by: Colin Rankin

Personal details
- Born: George Martin; 1858 Clarence, New South Wales, Australia
- Died: 14 May 1905 (aged 46 or 47) Childers, Queensland, Australia
- Resting place: Apple Tree Creek Cemetery
- Party: Labour
- Spouse: Annie Brown (m.1887)
- Occupation: Farmer, auctioneer

George Martin (1858 – 14 May 1905) was an auctioneer and member of the Queensland Legislative Assembly.

== Early days ==
Martin was born in Clarence, New South Wales, to parents George Martin and his wife Mary (née McPhee). He spent many years in Ballina where he worked as a farmer and also auctioneer. He moved to Childers around 1900 and continued in those trades.

== Political career ==
Martin, representing the Labour Party, was the member for Burrum in the Queensland Legislative Assembly from 1902 until his death three years later.

He was also an alderman in Ballina for many years and Mayor of the town twice.

== Personal life ==
In 1887, Martin married Annie Brown in Ballina and together had two daughters.

A member of the Order of Oddfellows, he died in 1905 and was buried in Apple Tree Creek Cemetery.

Parliament of Queensland
Preceded by Nicholas Tooth	Member for Burrum; 1902–1905	Succeeded by Colin Rankin
