= Brendan Hansen (politician) =

Australian politician (1922–1999)

Brendan Hansen OAM
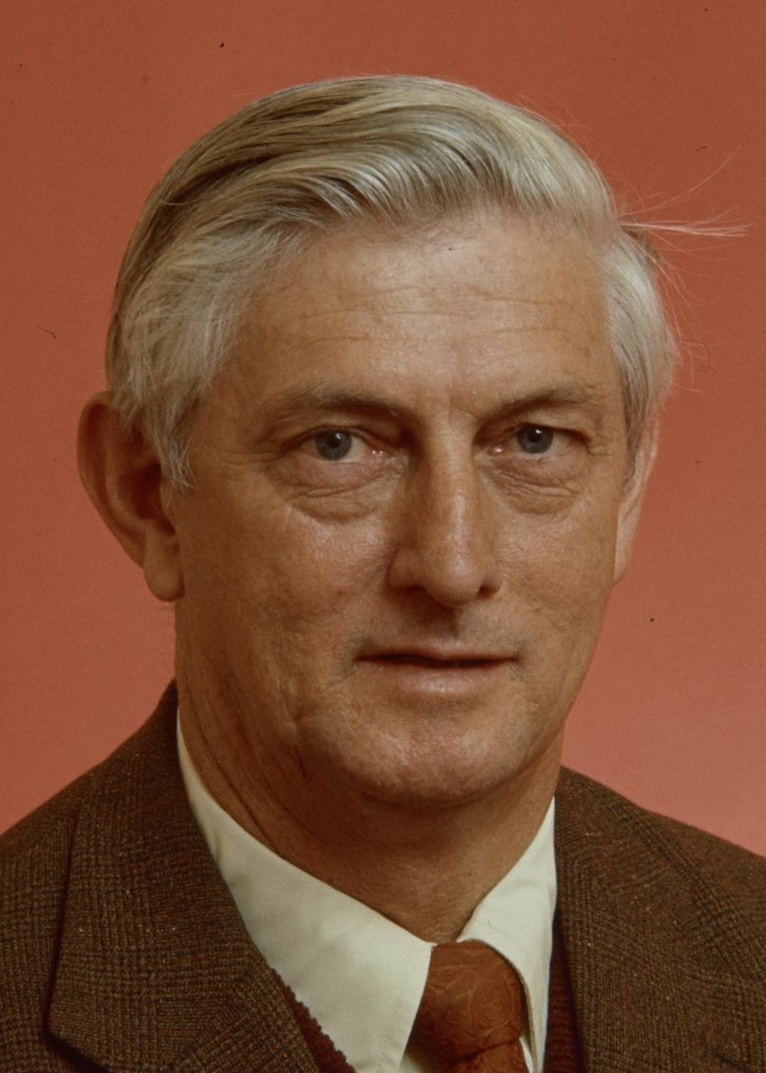

Member of the Australian Parliament for Wide Bay
- In office 9 December 1961 – 18 May 1974
- Preceded by: Henry Bandidt
- Succeeded by: Clarrie Millar

Member of the Queensland Legislative Assembly for Maryborough
- In office 12 November 1977 – 22 October 1983
- Preceded by: Gilbert Alison
- Succeeded by: Gilbert Alison

Personal details
- Born: 21 August 1922 Maryborough, Queensland, Australia
- Died: 19 December 1999 (aged 77) Maryborough, Queensland, Australia
- Resting place: Maryborough Cemetery
- Party: Australian Labor Party
- Spouse: Moira O'Sullivan (m.1960)
- Relations: Mary Hansen (daughter)
- Occupation: Shipwright

Brendan Percival Hansen OAM (21 August 1922 – 19 December 1999) was an Australian politician and trade unionist. He served as Member of Parliament for Wide Bay from 1961 to 1974 and as Member of the Legislative Assembly of Queensland for Maryborough in the Queensland Parliament from 1977 to 1983, representing the Australian Labor Party (ALP).

== Early life ==
Brendan Percival Hansen was born on 21 August 1922 in Maryborough, Queensland, Australia, the eldest son of Percy Hansen and Mary Ann (née Rowley). His father, a shipwright by trade, had been Secretary of the Shipwrights Union in Brisbane and Maryborough, and was involved in the founding of the Queensland Council of Unions.

Hansen was educated at the Granville State School and Christian Brothers College, Maryborough before becoming a shipwright and loftsman at the Walkers Limited shipyard in Maryborough. He joined the Labor Party in 1950 and served as Secretary of the party's Granville branch.

== Politics ==
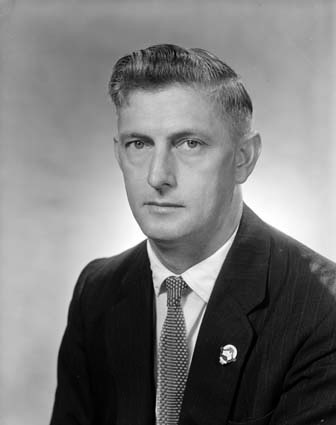
Hansen in 1962

Hansen served as President of the Maryborough sub-branch of the Federated Shipwrights' and Ship Constructors' Association of Australia and as an alderman on Maryborough City Council before entering federal politics. In 1958, he ran for the Australian House of Representatives as the Labor candidate for Wide Bay, losing to Country Party candidate Henry Bandidt. However, he won a rematch against Bandidt in 1961. It was the first time Labor had won the seat, once held by former Labor leader Andrew Fisher, since 1915.

After the Whitlam government was elected in the 1972 federal election he acted as government whip until 1974, when he was defeated by the Country Party's Clarrie Millar. Hansen ran against Millar again in 1975, but was heavily defeated amidst a landslide victory for the Coalition. In 1977, he was elected to the Legislative Assembly of Queensland as the member for Maryborough, a position he held until he stood down at the 1983 Queensland state election.

== Death ==
Hansen died on 19 December 1999, aged 77. In January 2001, his award of the Medal of the Order of Australia was posthumously announced, with the citation "For service to the community of Maryborough, particularly through the Maryborough and District Housing Action group and the Scouting movement". He is buried in the Maryborough Cemetery.

== Legacy ==
Hansen was honoured with a park in his name in Granville, Maryborough, and a government building, the Brendan Hansen Building, in nearby Hervey Bay.

== Family ==
Brendan Hansen married Moira O'Sullivan in 1960 at St Mary's Catholic Church, Maryborough. Moira Hansen is a light opera singer who still remains active in the city's arts community. In 2025 she was awarded an Order of Australia medal in the King's Birthday Honours list. They had eight children, including musician Mary Hansen (1966–2002), a longtime member of the English-French band Stereolab.

Parliament of Australia
Preceded by Henry Bandidt	Member for Wide Bay; 1961–1974	Succeeded by Clarrie Millar
Parliament of Queensland
Preceded by Gilbert Alison	Member for Maryborough; 1977–1983	Succeeded by Gilbert Alison
