= Bernard Corser =

Australian politician (1882–1967)

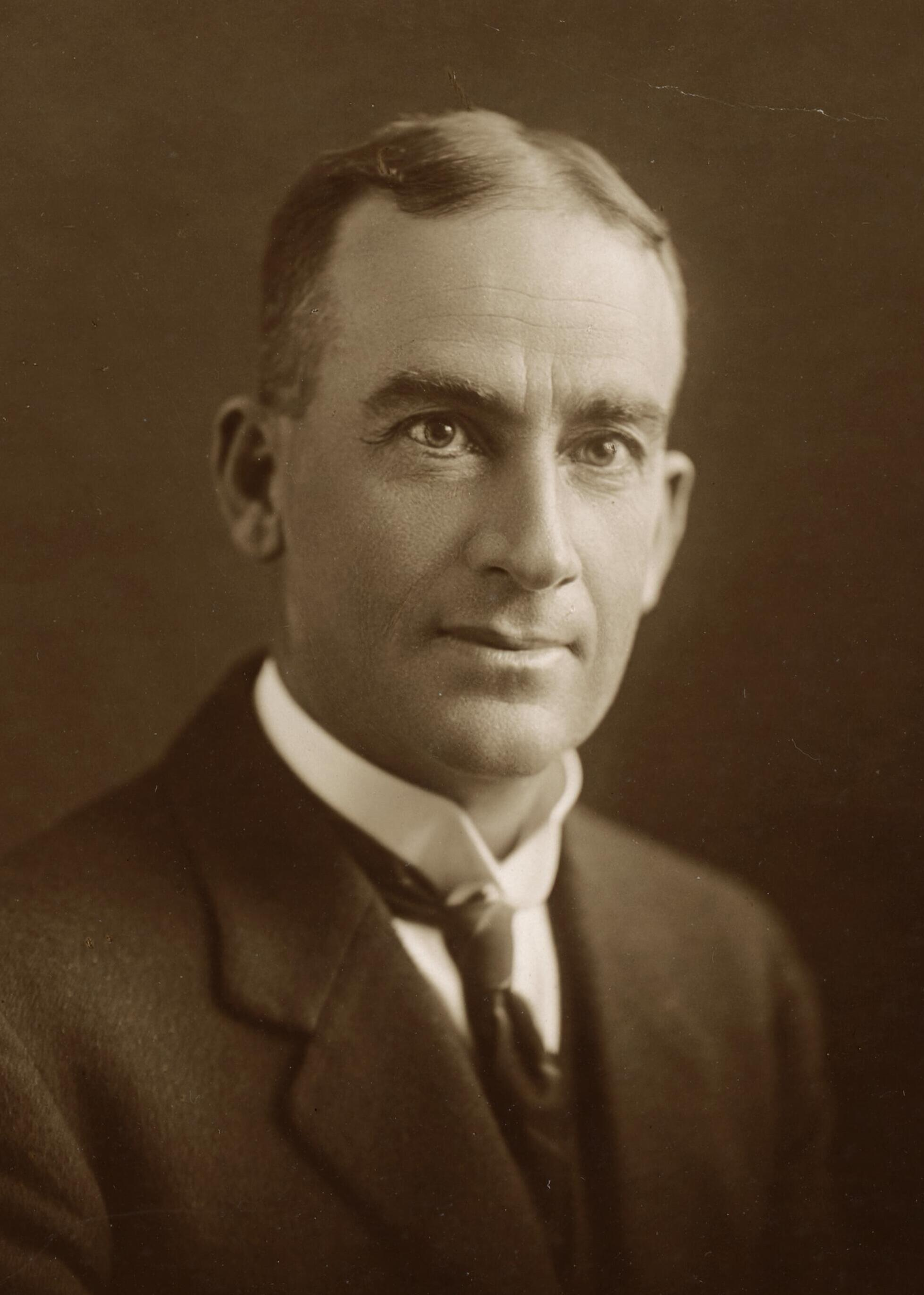

Member of the Australian Parliament for Wide Bay
- In office 3 September 1928 – 21 April 1954
- Preceded by: Edward Corser
- Succeeded by: William Brand

Member of the Queensland Legislative Assembly for Burnett
- In office 27 April 1912 – 16 August 1928
- Preceded by: Robert Hodge
- Succeeded by: Robert Boyd

Personal details
- Born: Bernard Henry Corser; 4 January 1882 Maryborough, Queensland, Australia
- Died: 15 December 1967 (aged 85) Sydney, New South Wales, Australia
- Resting place: Northern Suburbs Cemetery
- Party: Country Party
- Other political affiliations: Opposition, Ministerial, National Party, Country and Progressive National Party
- Spouse: Marie Glissan (m.1912 d.1964)
- Relations: Edward Corser (father)
- Occupation: Company director, Grazier

Bernard Henry Corser (4 January 1882 – 15 December 1967) was a politician in Queensland, Australia. He was a member of the Queensland Legislative Assembly from 1912 to 1928 and a member of the Australian House of Representatives from 1928 to 1954.

== Early life ==
Corser was born at Maryborough in 1882 to Edward Corser and Mary Jane (née Stewart). He was educated at Maryborough Christian Brothers' School, Riverview College, Sydney, and returned to Queensland to study at Queensland Agricultural College, Gatton.

== Politics ==
In 1912, he was elected to the Legislative Assembly of Queensland as the member for Burnett, joining the National Party on its formation in 1917. He held the seat until 1928.

By 1928, Corser had joined the Country Party and was elected to the Australian House of Representatives in a by-election for the seat of Wide Bay, which was caused by the death of his father, who was then the serving Nationalist MP.

In April 1939, the leader of the Country Party's senior Coalition partner the United Australia Party, Prime Minister Joseph Lyons, died, and the leader of the Country Party, Earle Page, became caretaker Prime Minister. The likely replacement for Lyons was Robert Menzies, but Page attacked him. Together with Arthur Fadden, Thomas Collins and Oliver Badman, Corser dissociated himself from Page, and when the latter resigned as leader, the four were barred from the party meeting that elected Page supporter Archie Cameron as leader. As a result, Corser and his colleagues rejected Cameron's leadership.

== Later life ==
Corser retired from politics in 1954 and became a grazier. He died in 1967 and was buried in Northern Suburbs Cemetery.

Parliament of Queensland
Preceded by Robert Hodge	Member for Burnett; 1912–1928	Succeeded by Robert Boyd
Parliament of Australia
Preceded by Edward Corser	Member for Wide Bay; 1928–1954	Succeeded by William Brand
