= Clarrie Millar =

Australian politician (1925–2017)

Clarrie Millar AM
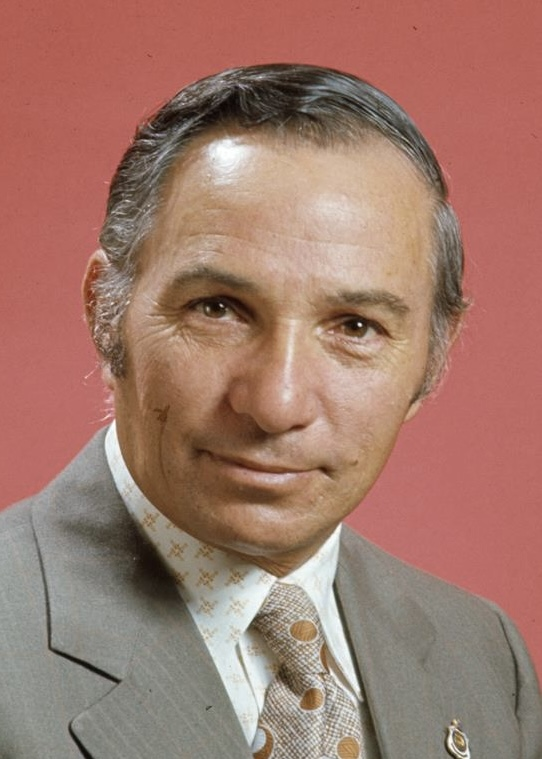
- Millar in 1974

Member of the Australian Parliament for Wide Bay
- In office 18 May 1974 – 19 February 1990
- Preceded by: Brendan Hansen
- Succeeded by: Warren Truss

Personal details
- Born: Percival Clarence Turbill; 15 June 1925 Adelaide, South Australia, Australia
- Died: 28 November 2017 (aged 92) Brisbane, Queensland, Australia
- Party: National Party of Australia
- Children: Lisa Millar
- Occupation: Public servant, farmer

Percival Clarence Millar AM (né Turbill; 15 June 1925 – 28 November 2017) was an Australian politician. He was a member of the National Party and served in the House of Representatives from 1974 to 1990, representing the Queensland seat of Wide Bay. Prior to entering politics he was a public servant, soldier and farmer.

== Early life ==
Millar was born on 15 June 1925 in Norwood, South Australia, the son of Elsie (née Klaebe) and Percival John Turbill. His father, a clerk, salesman and tram driver, died of tuberculosis in 1935. His mother subsequently married William Donald Millar and he was given his stepfather's surname.

As a child, Millar's family "followed an itinerant life across Victoria and Tasmania" in the aftermath of the Great Depression. He left school at the age of thirteen, by which time the family had settled in Hobart. As a teenager he worked as an assayer at the Rosebery zinc mines and as a salesman in a Hobart department store, before joining the Postmaster-General's Department in 1940. He worked for the department as a messenger boy, post office assistant, and junior assistant telegrapher.

== Military service ==
Millar enlisted in the Royal Australian Air Force (RAAF) in 1943, at the age of 18. He joined the Central Bureau as a radio operator conducting signals intelligence. He was initially stationed in Brisbane and later in the Northern Territory, where he intercepted the Japanese message of surrender in 1945. He was discharged from the RAAF in 1946 with the rank of leading aircraftman.

== Post-war work ==
After being discharged from the RAAF, Millar re-joined the Postmaster-General's Department in the telegraph section of the General Post Office in Sydney. He transferred to the Department of Immigration in 1948, then in 1950 left the public service and moved to Biloela, Queensland, where he operated a dairy farm alongside his brother and stepfather. The farm experienced financial difficulties and after five years Millar moved to Brisbane where he found work as a real estate agent. He subsequently returned to dairy farming at Kilkivan. He became "an innovative farmer, practising soil conservation and strip grazing, and improving his herd by artificial insemination", and also obtaining a pilot's licence.

== Politics ==
Millar was elected chairman of the Country Party's Kilkivan branch in 1974, having previously held office in state and federal electorate councils. He was elected to the House of Representatives at the 1974 federal election, defeating incumbent Australian Labor Party (ALP) MP Brendan Hansen in the seat of Wide Bay. He was re-elected on six further occasions, retiring at the 1990 election.

Millar served as chairman of committees from 1978 to 1983. As acting speaker he developed a reputation for impartiality, stemming from an adverse ruling he made against Prime Minister Malcolm Fraser in 1979, and was said to have "presided with competence, decorum, and fairness, seldom raising his voice". He was also a long-serving member of the Joint Statutory Committee on Public Works, including as deputy chair from 1985 to 1990.

In 1987, Millar was part of a group of Queensland National Party MPs that supported the party's withdrawal from the coalition with the Liberal Party. In the lead-up to the 1987 election he opposed efforts to re-form the coalition and called for the ouster of the party's leader Ian Sinclair, stating that "any leader who relegates his party to the position of mediocrity should resign". Millar nonetheless denied association with the Joh for Canberra movement that had prompted the split in the coalition and refused overtures to resign his seat in favour of Queensland premier Joh Bjelke-Petersen.

Together with Labor MP Tom Uren, Millar was the last World War II combat veteran to serve in the House, though Russ Gorman who was a non-combat WWII veteran would serve until 1996.

== Personal life ==
In 1948, Millar married Dorothy Cooper, with whom he had five children, including ABC journalist Lisa Millar. He died in Brisbane on 28 November 2017, aged 92.

Parliament of Australia
Preceded by Brendan Hansen	Member for Wide Bay; 1974–1990	Succeeded by Warren Truss
