= Henry Bandidt =

Australian politician (1906–1990)

Henry Bandidt MBE
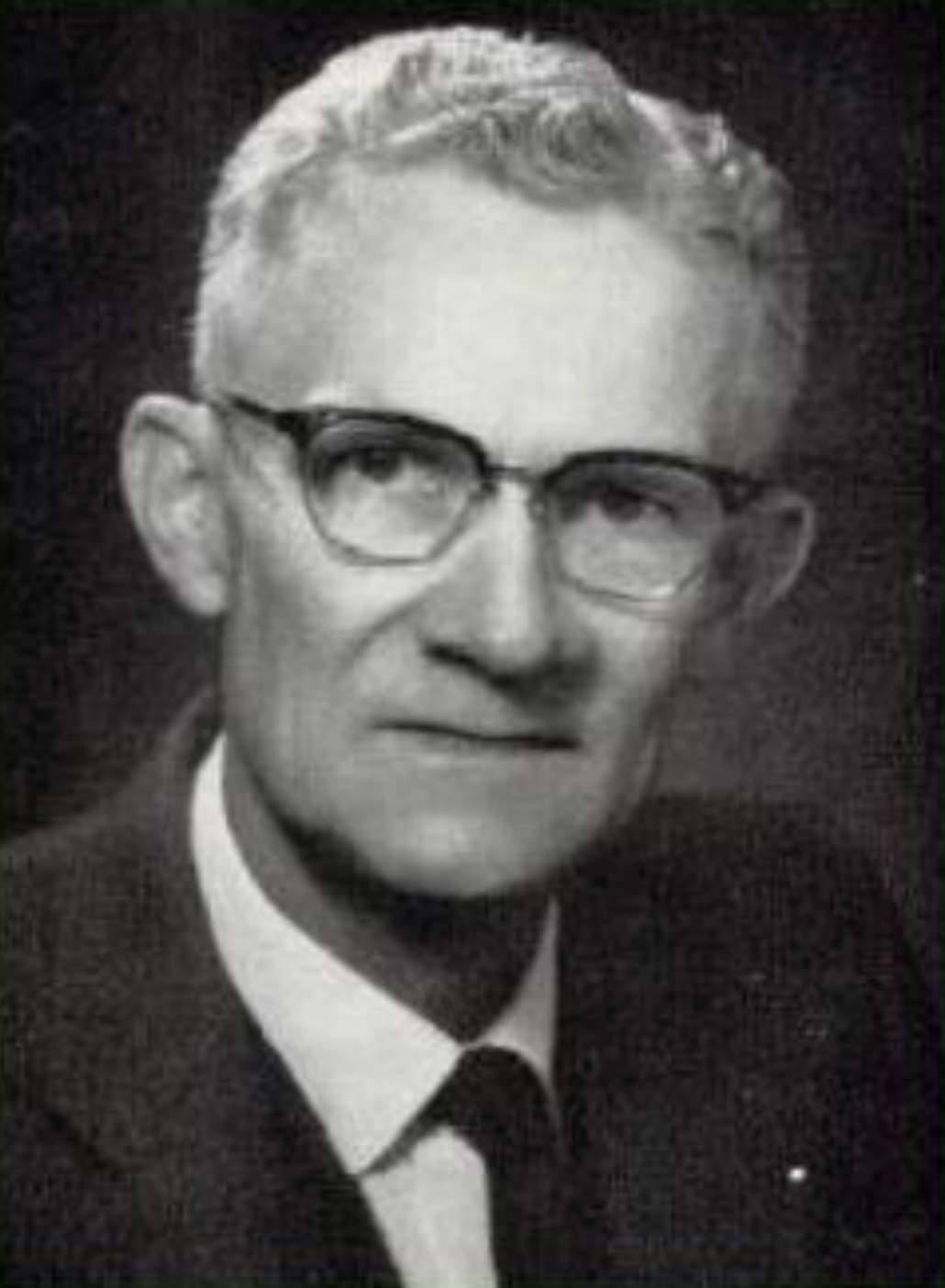

Member of the Australian Parliament for Wide Bay
- In office 22 November 1958 – 9 December 1961
- Preceded by: William Brand
- Succeeded by: Brendan Hansen

Personal details
- Born: 12 December 1906 Gatton, Queensland
- Died: 6 January 1990 (aged 83)
- Party: Australian Country Party
- Occupation: Farmer

Henry Norman Charles Bandidt, MBE (12 December 1906 – 6 January 1990) was an Australian politician. Born near Gatton, Queensland, he was educated at Ipswich Grammar School and the University of Queensland before becoming a solicitor in 1931. While at University, he resided at King's College, his first year being 1925. He was a dairy farmer, writer and lecturer, as well as an official with the Queensland branch of the Country Party. In 1958, he was elected to the Australian House of Representatives as the Country Party member for Wide Bay. He was defeated in 1961. Bandidt died in 1990.

Parliament of Australia
Preceded by William Brand	Member for Wide Bay; 1958 – 1961	Succeeded by Brendan Hansen
