= Electoral district of Burrum =

Former state electoral district of Queensland, Australia

Burrum Queensland—Legislative Assembly
- State: Queensland
- Created: 1888
- Abolished: 1932
- Demographic: Rural

Burrum was a Legislative Assembly electorate in the state of Queensland, Australia.

== History ==
Burrum was created by the Electoral Districts Act of 1887, taking effect at the 1888 elections. It was based on the rural area around Maryborough, Queensland.

Burrum was abolished at the 1932 elections, its area being incorporated into the Electoral district of Isis and Electoral district of Wide Bay.

== Members ==
The following people were elected in the seat of Burrum:

Member	Party	Term
Charles Powers	Opposition	1888–1893
Nicholas Tooth	Ministerial	1893–1902
George Martin	Labor	1902–1905
Colin Rankin	Ministerial	1905–1918
Colin Rankin	Liberal	1905–1918
Albert Whitford	Labor	1918–1920
William Brand	Country	1920–1932

== See also ==
- Electoral districts of Queensland
- Members of the Queensland Legislative Assembly by year
- Category:Members of the Queensland Legislative Assembly by name
