= 1915 Wide Bay by-election =

11 December 1915
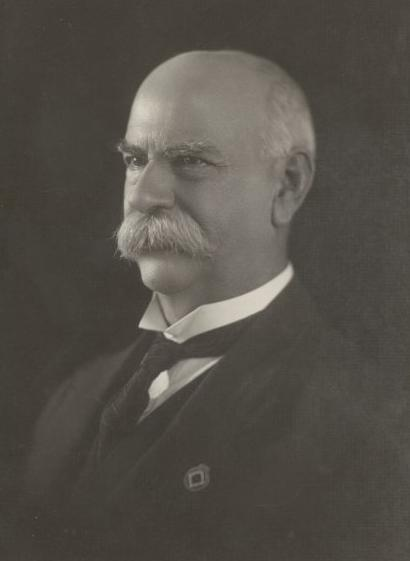
	First party	Second party
		ALP
Candidate	Edward Corser	Andrew Thompson
Party	Liberal	Labor
Popular vote	14,027	13,941
Percentage	50.15%	49.85%
Swing	▲50.15pp	▼14.46pp
MP before election
Andrew Fisher
Labor
Elected MP
Edward Corser
Liberal

A by-election was held for the Australian House of Representatives seat of Wide Bay on 11 December 1915. This was triggered by the resignation of former Labor Party Prime Minister and MP Andrew Fisher.

The by-election was won by Commonwealth Liberal Party candidate Edward Corser by 43 votes, after the party previously did not contest the seat at the 1914 federal election — instead, the seat was contested by independent candidate John Austin, on 35.7 percent of the vote. Labor lost 14.5 percent of its vote from just over a year earlier. Voting was not compulsory in 1915.

== Results ==
1915 Wide Bay by-election
Party	Candidate	Votes	%	±%
Liberal	Edward Corser	14,027	50.15	+50.15
Labor	Andrew Thompson	13,941	49.85	−14.46
Total formal votes		27,968	99.12	+2.02
Informal votes		248	0.88	−2.02
Registered electors		34,276		
Turnout		28,216	82.32	+4.21
Liberal gain from Labor				

== See also ==
- List of Australian federal by-elections
