= Edward Corser =

Australian politician (1852–1928)

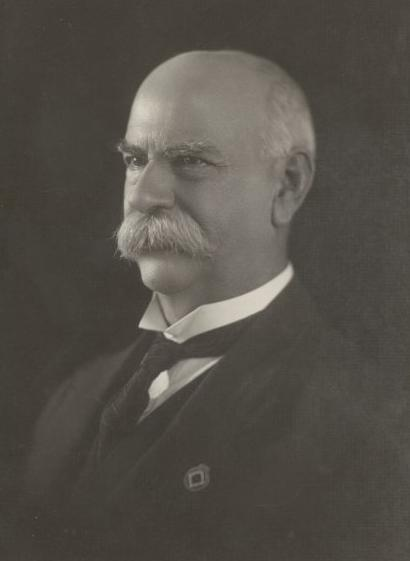

Member of the Australian Parliament for Wide Bay
- In office 11 December 1915 – 31 July 1928
- Preceded by: Andrew Fisher
- Succeeded by: Bernard Corser

Member of the Queensland Legislative Assembly for Maryborough
- In office 12 October 1909 – 21 May 1915 Serving with Charles Booker
- Preceded by: William Mitchell
- Succeeded by: Alfred Jones

Personal details
- Born: Edward Bernard Cresset Corser; 1852 Upton Cressett, Shropshire, England
- Died: 31 July 1928 (aged 75–76) Maryborough, Queensland, Australia
- Resting place: Maryborough Cemetery
- Party: Liberal (1915–17); Nationalist (1917–28)
- Other political affiliations: Ministerial
- Spouse: Mary Jane Brown (m.1877 d.1926)
- Relations: Bernard Corser (son)
- Occupation: Businessman

Edward Bernard Cresset Corser (1852 – 31 July 1928) was an Australian politician. He was a Liberal Party member of the Queensland Legislative Assembly for Maryborough from 1909 to 1915 and a Commonwealth Liberal Party and then Nationalist Party member of the Australian House of Representatives from 1915 until his death.

== Early life and business career ==
Corser was born at Upton Cressett, near Birmingham in England, and was educated in Worcester. He migrated to Brisbane, Queensland with his family in 1864 and worked for three years on the Maryborough Sugar Company's plantation. He then worked as a clerk for the Commercial Banking Company of Sydney, variously stationed in Maryborough, Brisbane and Gayndah, rising to become acting manager of the Gayndah branch at the age of 21. In 1872, he opened his own wholesale merchant business, Corser and Co. Ltd., which became a "large commercial establishment" at Maryborough selling wine, spirits and general merchandise, and continued to be managed by one of his sons after he entered politics.

Corser was a co-founder and president of the Maryborough Chamber of Commerce, a long-serving member and nine-year chairman of the Burrum Divisional Board, president of the Maryborough Harbour Board, president of the Western Railway Association, one of the original shareholders of the Maryborough Co-operative Dairy Association Ltd., and was a member and president of the Maryborough Grammar School board and local hospitals' committee. As a prominent local figure prior to his entry into politics, he championed the construction of the Nanango railway line, Gayndah railway line and the failed Port of Urangan project. He was a supporter of both Federation and the White Australia Policy and was a strong protectionist.

== Political career ==
In 1909, he was elected to the Legislative Assembly of Queensland as the member for the multi-member seat of Maryborough, and when it became a single-member seat in 1912 was re-elected by only 10 votes. A by-election was ordered, which he was eventually declared to have won by 2 votes; a further challenge did not proceed for procedural reasons. He was defeated at the 1915 state election. His son, Bernard Corser, sat in the Legislative Assembly along with him as the member for Burnett.

In 1915, as the candidate of the conservative Commonwealth Liberal Party, he transferred to federal Parliament by winning the 1915 Wide Bay by-election caused by the resignation of Labor Prime Minister Andrew Fisher. In 1917, together with the rest of his party, he became a Nationalist. He was re-elected with increasingly large majorities over time, and polled the largest majority of his career at his final election.

Corser died unexpectedly in his sleep at his family's Maryborough home, "Eskdale", in 1928 while still a serving MP. His funeral was held in St Mary's Church and he was buried in Maryborough Cemetery. His son, Bernard Corser, won the by-election for his seat; Bernard had previously served alongside his father in the Queensland Legislative Assembly.

Parliament of Australia
Preceded by Andrew Fisher	Member for Wide Bay; 1915–1928	Succeeded by Bernard Corser
Parliament of Queensland
Preceded by William Mitchell	Member for Maryborough; 1909–1915; Served alongside: Charles Booker	Succeeded by Alfred Jones
