= 1928 Wide Bay by-election =

31 July 1928
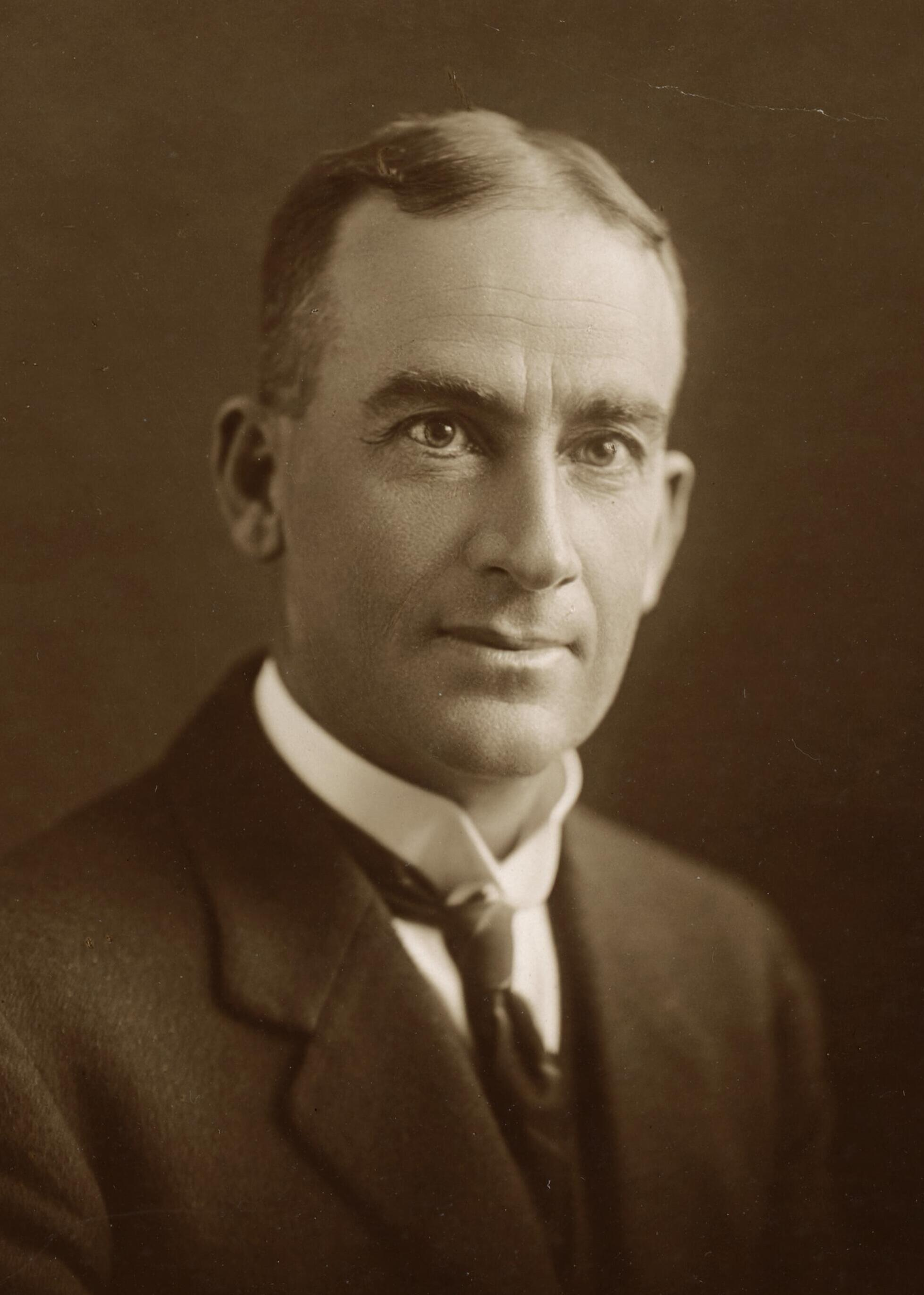
	First party
Candidate	Bernard Corser
Party	Country
Popular vote	unopposed
MP before election
Edward Corser
Nationalist
Elected MP
Bernard Corser
Country

A by-election for the Australian House of Representatives seat of Wide Bay was triggered by the death, on 31 July 1928, of Nationalist MP Edward Corser. However, by the close of nominations on 3 September only one candidate had nominated: Corser's son Bernard, who had the endorsement of the Nationalists' coalition partner the Country Party. Corser was thus declared elected unopposed. This is the only by-election at which a change of party status has not been contested.

== Results ==
Wide Bay by-election, 1928
Party	Candidate	Votes	%	±%
Country	Bernard Corser	unopposed		
Country gain from Nationalist		Swing		
