= Nicholas Tooth =

Australian politician (1844–1913)

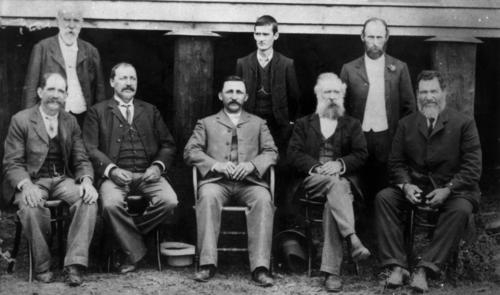
- First Pialba Shire Council c.1900–1908 – Nicholas Tooth is at the right on the rear row.

Member of the Queensland Legislative Assembly for Burrum
- In office 13 May 1893 – 11 March 1902
- Preceded by: Charles Powers
- Succeeded by: George Martin

Personal details
- Born: Nicholas Edward Nelson Tooth; 7 September 1844 Sydney, New South Wales, Australia
- Died: 17 August 1913 (aged 68) Maryborough, Queensland, Australia
- Resting place: Maryborough Cemetery
- Party: Ministerial
- Spouse: Charlotte Tomson (m.1868 d.1940)
- Occupation: Foundry owner

Nicholas Edward Nelson Tooth (7 September 1844 – 17 August 1913) was a foundry owner and member of the Queensland Legislative Assembly.

== Early days ==
Tooth was born at Sydney to John Tooth and his wife Elizabeth (née Newnham) and was educated at Castle's private school in Calder House, Sydney. He began his working career as a clerk with the Bank of New South Wales before unsuccessfully trying his hand at pastoral pursuits at Widgee Station. He then leased Kolan Station and was a stock-drover before becoming an agent and auctioneer in Maryborough.

For two years he was a farmer in Maryborough before joining Walkers Foundry as a clerk. He then became a senior partner at the Vulcan Foundry in Maryborough.

== Political career ==
After serving as an alderman in Maryborough including four stints as mayor in 1880–81, 1885–86, 1889, and 1891 he stood for the seat of Burrum in the Queensland Legislative Assembly in 1893, defeating the Labour candidate, Mr J Willard. He went on to hold the seat until 1902 when he was defeated by George Martin of the Labour Party.

In August 1905 the Pialba Shire Council appointed Tooth as its first Shire Clerk, a position he served in until his death in August 1913.

== Personal life ==
On 14 April 1868, Tooth married Charlotte Thomson (died 1940) and together had four sons and four daughters.

He was a Major in the Wide Bay and Burnett Infantry Regiment, a member of the Protestant Alliance Friendly Society, and was also a member of the Chamber of Commerce, the Hospital Board, the School of Arts, and the Pastoral and Agricultural Society.

Tooth died in 1913 and was buried in the Maryborough Cemetery.

Parliament of Queensland
Preceded by Charles Powers	Member for Burrum; 1893–1902	Succeeded by George Martin
