= Albert Whitford (politician) =

Australian politician (1877–1924)

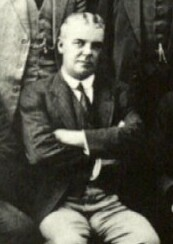

Member of the Queensland Legislative Assembly for Burrum
- In office 16 March 1918 – 9 October 1920
- Preceded by: Colin Rankin
- Succeeded by: William Brand

Personal details
- Born: Albert Edward Victor Whitford; 1877 Woolwich, England
- Died: 29 January 1924 (aged 46 or 47) Brisbane, Queensland, Australia
- Resting place: Toowong Cemetery
- Party: Labor
- Spouse: Ethel Maud Scott (m.1897)
- Occupation: Tailor

Albert Edward Victor Whitford (1877 – 29 January 1924) was a tailor and member of the Queensland Legislative Assembly. He was shot dead in Brisbane in 1924.

== Early days ==
Whitford was born in Woolwich, England, to parents Charles Whitford and his wife Dora (née Kelly). He was a tailor in Inverell in 1906 before heading to Childers in 1910 to continue his trade.

== Political career ==
Whitford, representing the Labor Party, first stood for the seat of Burrum in the Queensland Legislative Assembly at the 1912 state election only to be beaten by the sitting member, Colin Rankin. He was once again beaten by Rankin at the 1915 state election but finally won the seat in 1918. He held the seat until 1920.

== Personal life ==
In 1897, Whitford married Ethel Maud Scott and together had two sons and two daughters.

== Death ==
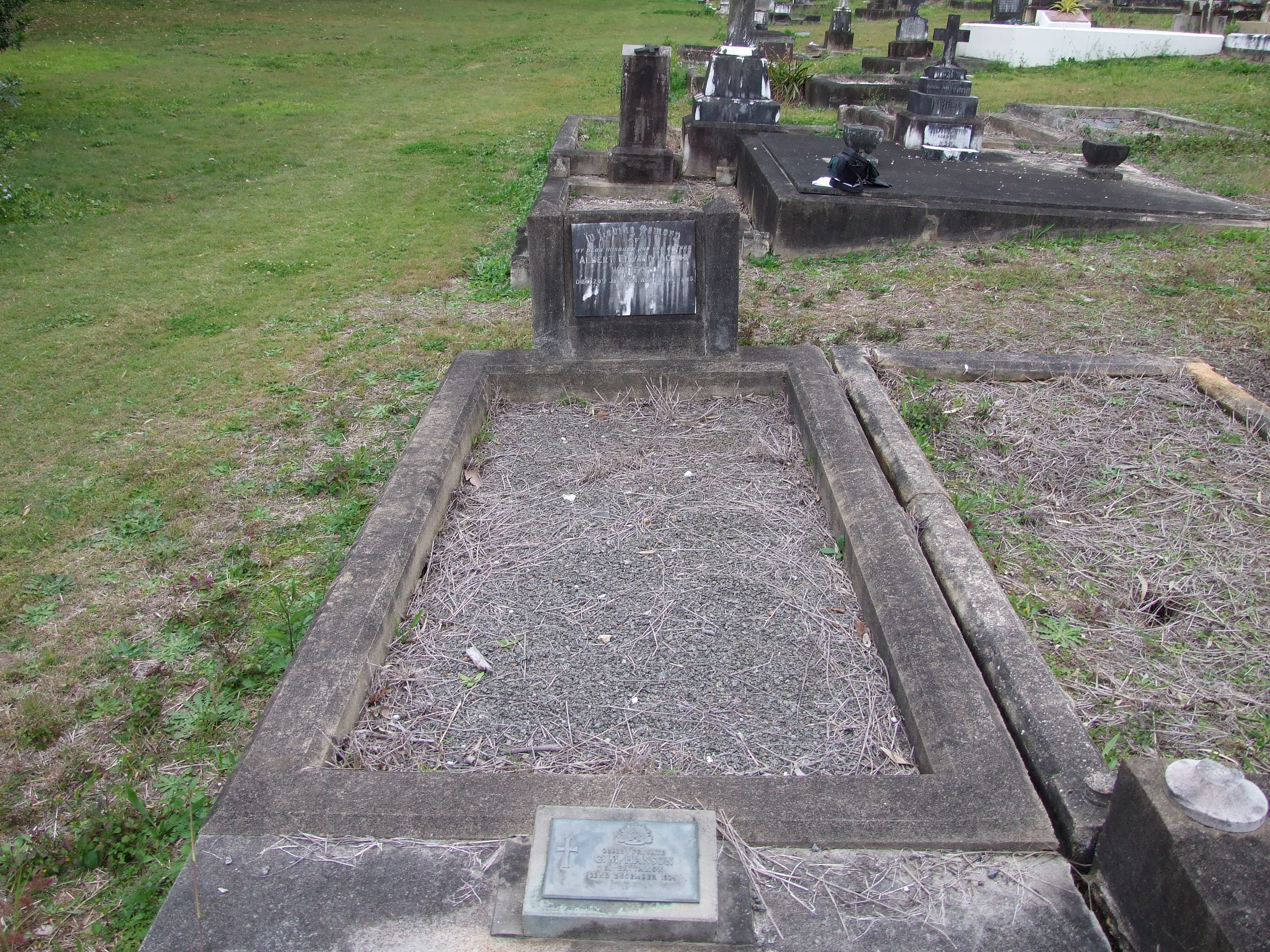
Albert Whitford's Grave at Toowong Cemetery

The circumstances relating to the killing of Whitford were as follows, Whitford and his wife were at the Tivoli Theatre where they stayed until 7.50 pm. The gunman, later identified as James William Laydon, was also in attendance that night with his wife. Laydon was a returned serviceman who had returned from The Great War. Laydon confronted Whitford outside the theatre and Laydon said that he would fetch his wife, who had made some serious accusations to him about Whitford. Whitford wanting to avoid a scene declared he had an appointment, said he would see Laydon later. Whitford and his wife made off across the road and Laydon called out, "Whitford, you're a mongrel." Laydon followed Whitford across Albert Square to the corner of the Square and Adelaide Street, and then shot Whitford once in the neck and once in the forehead, and when Whitford fell to the ground, stood over him and fired three more shots killing him instantly. The gunman then coolly waited until police took him into custody and charged him with murder.

A Police constable told the court that Laydon said to him, "I shot him. What would you have done if he had taken your wife to a brothel while you were at the war?" Laydon, it also was said, remarked to the police, "I was taught at the war to kill my enemies; I killed many there that never did me any harm." Justice O'Sullivan in summing up commented on the fact that no evidence had been brought forward to prove the allegations. "It was a slur on a dead man, who is not here to disprove it. If there was anything in it some evidence could have been brought forward to prove it."

Whitford was buried in the Toowong Cemetery, a mere nineteen hours after he was murdered.

Laydon was given a life sentence with hard labour. Laydon appealed his sentence and was finally released on parole after serving seven years. For many years the R.S.S.I.L.A., had lobbied the Governments of the day reasons for the exercise of clemency in this case, and the Moore Government agreed to recommend that he should be released upon serving seven years.

Parliament of Queensland
Preceded by Colin Rankin	Member for Burrum; 1918–1920	Succeeded by William Brand
