= William Brand =

Australian politician (1888–1979)

Sir William Brand CBE
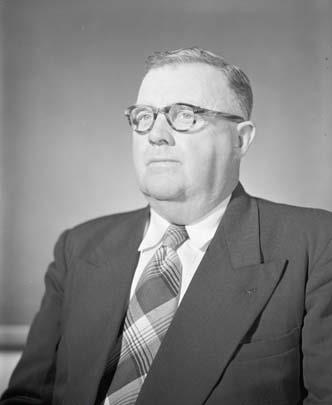
- William Brand in 1956

Member of the Australian Parliament for Wide Bay
- In office 29 May 1954 – 14 October 1958
- Preceded by: Bernard Corser
- Succeeded by: Henry Bandidt

Member of the Queensland Legislative Assembly for Burrum
- In office 9 October 1920 – 11 June 1932
- Preceded by: Albert Whitford

Member of the Queensland Legislative Assembly for Isis
- In office 11 June 1932 – 29 April 1950
- Succeeded by: Jack Pizzey

Personal details
- Born: 22 August 1888 Childers, Queensland
- Died: 26 October 1979 (aged 91) Childers, Queensland
- Resting place: Apple Tree Creek Cemetery
- Party: Country Party
- Spouse: Myrtle Maud Kingston (m.1913 d.1984)
- Occupation: Sugarcane grower

Sir William Alfred Brand, CBE (22 August 1888 – 26 October 1979) was an Australian politician. Born in Childers, Queensland, he was educated at Apple Tree Creek State School before becoming a sugarcane grower. He became president of the Australian Sugar Growers Association in 1943.

In 1920, he was elected to the Legislative Assembly of Queensland as the Country Party member for Burrum, transferring to Isis in 1932. He was Deputy Leader of the Opposition from 1944 to 1947. He retired from the Assembly in 1950, but in 1954 was elected to the Australian House of Representatives as the Country Party member for Wide Bay, which he held until his retirement in 1958. Brand was knighted in 1965.

Brand died in 1979 and was buried in Apple Tree Creek Cemetery.

Parliament of Australia
Preceded by Bernard Corser	Member for Wide Bay; 1954–1958	Succeeded by Henry Bandidt
Parliament of Queensland
Preceded by Albert Whitford	Member for Burrum; 1920–1932	Abolished
New seat	Member for Isis; 1932–1950	Succeeded by Jack Pizzey
