= Members of the Queensland Legislative Assembly, 1902–1904 =

This is a list of members of the 14th Legislative Assembly of Queensland from 1902 to 1904, as elected at the 1902 state election held on 11 March 1902.

While only the Australian Labor Federation stood as a party, the fall of Philp's government and the rise of prominent Liberal Arthur Morgan in 1903 produced a realignment of non-Labour MLAs into liberal and conservative groupings.

Name	Party (pre-1903)	Party (post-1903)	Electorate	Term in office
Peter Airey	Labour	Labour	Flinders	1901–1907; 1908–1909
William Drayton Armstrong	Ministerial	Conservative	Lockyer	1893–1904; 1907–1918
George Barber	Labour	Labour	Bundaberg	1901–1935
Walter Barnes	Ministerial	Conservative	Bulimba	1901–1915; 1918–1933
Charles Hastings Barton^{[1]}	Labour	N/A	Maryborough	1902
Joshua Thomas Bell	Ministerial	Liberal	Dalby	1893–1911
James Blair	Opposition	Liberal	Ipswich	1902–1915
Jason Boles	Opposition	Liberal	Port Curtis	1893–1904
Thomas Bridges	Ministerial	Liberal	Nundah	1896–1907; 1909–1918
William Browne	Labour	Labour	Croydon	1893–1904
John Burrows	Labour	Labour	Charters Towers	1901–1907
John Cameron	Ministerial	Conservative	Brisbane North	1893–1896; 1901–1908
John Dunmore Campbell	Ministerial	Conservative	Moreton	1899–1909
Arthur Cooper	Ind. Min.	Liberal	Mitchell	1902–1905
Henri Cowap	Labour	Labour	Fitzroy	1902–1909
Alfred Cowley	Ministerial	Conservative	Herbert	1888–1907
James Cribb	Ministerial	Conservative	Bundamba	1893–1896; 1899–1915
Thomas Bridson Cribb	Ministerial	Conservative	Ipswich	1896–1904
David Dalrymple	Ministerial	Conservative	Mackay	1888–1904
Digby Denham^{[2]}	Ministerial	Liberal	Oxley	1902–1915
Thomas Dibley	Labour	Labour	Woolloongabba	1896–1907
John Dunsford	Labour	Labour	Charters Towers	1893–1905
John Fogarty	Opposition	Liberal	Drayton & Toowoomba	1893–1904
Edward Barrow Forrest	Ministerial	Conservative	Brisbane North	1899–1912
James Forsythe	Ministerial	Conservative	Carpentaria	1899–1907; 1909–1918
George Fox	Ministerial	Conservative	Normanby	1877–1878; 1901–1914
Justin Foxton	Ministerial	Conservative	Carnarvon	1883–1904
Henry Garde^{[1]}	Ministerial	Conservative	Maryborough	1902–1904
Kenneth Grant	Labour	Labour	Rockhampton	1902–1915
Samuel Grimes^{[2]}	Ministerial	N/A	Oxley	1878–1902
John Hamilton	Ministerial	Conservative	Cook	1878–1904
William Hamilton	Labour	Labour	Gregory	1899–1915
Patrick Hanran	Ministerial	Conservative	Townsville	1899–1909
Herbert Hardacre	Labour	Labour	Leichhardt	1893–1919
Arthur Hawthorn	Independent	Liberal	Enoggera	1902–1911
Robert Hodge	Farmers' Rep.	Liberal	Rosewood	1902–1904; 1909–1920
George Jackson	Labour	Labour	Kennedy	1893–1909
Charles Moffatt Jenkinson^{[3]}	Opposition	Independent	Fassifern	1898–1902; 1903–1909
Francis Kates^{[5]}	Ministerial	N/A	Cunningham	1878–1881; 1883–1888; 1899–1903
Francis Kenna	Labour	Labour	Bowen	1902–1909
William Kent	Ministerial	Conservative	Burnett	1899–1904
George Kerr	Labour	Labour	Barcoo	1893–1909
William Kidston	Labour	Labour	Rockhampton	1896–1911
Alec Lamont	Ministerial	Conservative	South Brisbane	1902–1904
John Leahy	Ministerial	Conservative	Bulloo	1893–1909
Patrick Leahy	Ministerial	Conservative	Warrego	1902–1908
Vincent Lesina	Labour	Labour	Clermont	1899–1912
George Lindley	Ind. Min.	Liberal	Wide Bay	1902–1907
James Lyons	Ministerial	Conservative	Cairns	1902–1904
Edward Macartney	Ministerial	Conservative	Toowong	1900–1908; 1909–1920
Frank McDonnell	Labour	Labour	Fortitude Valley	1896–1907
Donald MacKintosh	Ministerial	Liberal	Cambooya	1899–1915
John McMaster	Ministerial	Conservative	Fortitude Valley	1885–1899; 1901–1904; 1907–1908
George Martin	Labour	Labour	Burrum	1902–1905
William Maxwell	Labour	Labour	Burke	1899–1909
William Moore	Ministerial	Liberal	Murilla	1898–1904; 1907–1909
Arthur Morgan	Ministerial	Liberal	Warwick	1887–1896; 1898–1906
Daniel Mulcahy	Labour	Labour	Gympie	1901–1912
Thomas Murray-Prior^{[3]}	Opposition	N/A	Fassifern	1902
John Norman	Labour	Labour	Maryborough	1902–1907
William O'Connell^{[4]}	Ministerial	N/A	Musgrave	1888–1903
Walter Paget	Ministerial	Conservative	Mackay	1901–1915
Andrew Lang Petrie	Ministerial	Conservative	Toombul	1893–1926
Robert Philp	Ministerial	Conservative	Townsville	1886–1915
Thomas Plunkett	Opposition	Liberal	Albert	1888–1896; 1899–1908
Arthur Rutledge	Ministerial	Conservative	Maranoa	1878–1893; 1899–1904
George Ryland	Labour	Labour	Gympie	1899–1912
William Stephens	Ministerial	Conservative	South Brisbane	1888–1904; 1907–1908
James Stodart	Ministerial	Conservative	Logan	1896–1918
George Story	Ministerial	Conservative	Balonne	1896–1904
William Summerville	Labour	Independent	Stanley	1902–1904
William Thorn	Opposition	Independent	Aubigny	1894–1904; 1908–1912
James Tolmie	Ministerial	Liberal	Drayton & Toowoomba	1901–1907; 1909–1918
Henry Turner	Labour	Labour	North Rockhampton	1901, 1902–1907
Duncan Watson^{[5]}	Ministerial	Conservative	Cunningham	1903–1904
John White^{[4]}	Ministerial	Conservative	Musgrave	1903–1904; 1907–1915
Michael Woods	Labour	Labour	Woothakata	1902–1909

== See also ==
- 1902 Queensland state election
- Premier:

Robert Philp (Ministerial) (1899–1903)
Arthur Morgan (Liberal) (1903–1906)

== Notes ==
^{1} On 16 June 1902, Charles Hastings Barton, the newly elected Labour member for Maryborough, died before taking his seat. Ministerial candidate Henry Garde won the resulting by-election on 3 July 1902.
^{2} On 18 June 1902, Samuel Grimes, the Ministerial member for Oxley, died. Ministerial candidate Digby Denham won the resulting by-election on 3 July 1902.
^{3} On 11 December 1902, Thomas Murray-Prior, the Opposition member for Fassifern, died. Opposition candidate Charles Moffatt Jenkinson won the resulting by-election on 13 January 1903.
^{4} On 4 March 1903, William O'Connell, the Ministerial member for Musgrave, died. Ministerial candidate John White won the resulting by-election on 4 April 1903.
^{5} On 16 September 1903, Francis Kates, the Ministerial member for Cunningham, died. Ministerial candidate Duncan Watson won the resulting by-election on 29 October 1903.
