= Ilfracombe, Maryborough =

Ilfracombe
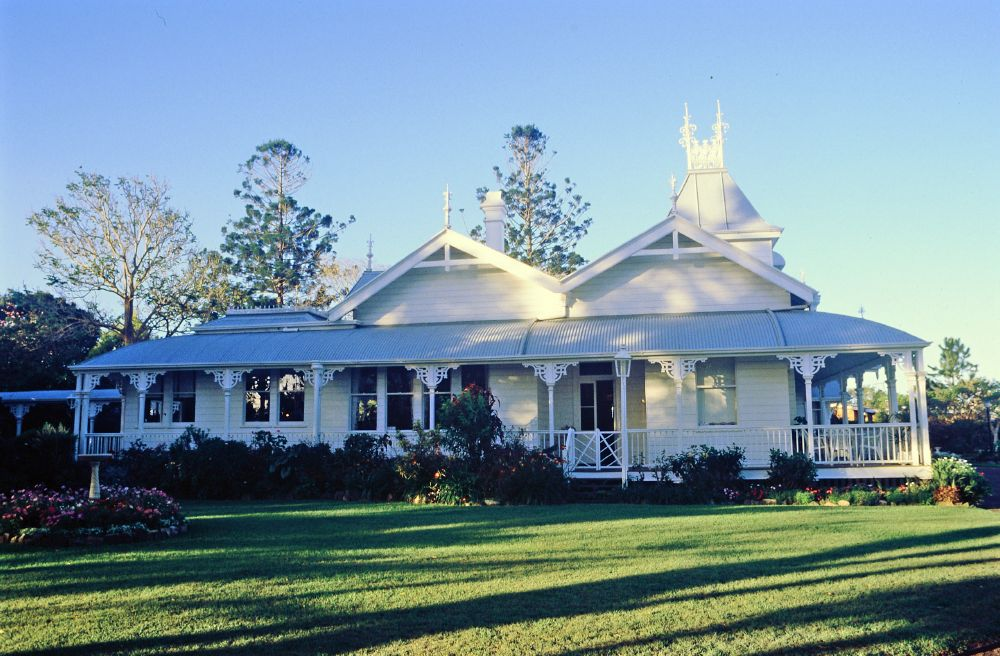
- Ilfracombe, 1997

- Location within Queensland Location within Australia
- 25.5276°S 152.7114°E
- Location: 335 Lennox Street, Maryborough, Fraser Coast Region, Queensland, Australia

History
- Design period: 1870s–1890s (late 19th century)
- Built: c. 1893–c. 1895

Queensland Heritage Register
- Official name: Ilfracombe, Blairholme, Lambert Hyne House
- Type: state heritage (landscape, built)
- Designated: 21 October 1992
- Reference no.: 600703
- Significant period: 1890s (fabric); 1890s–1930s (historical)
- Significant components: residential accommodation – main house, attic, glass – etched, decorative finishes, garden/grounds

Ilfracombe is a heritage-listed villa at 335 Lennox Street, Maryborough, Fraser Coast Region, Queensland, Australia. It was built from c. 1893 to c. 1895 for Margaret Blair. It is also known as Blairholme and Lambert Hyne House. It was added to the Queensland Heritage Register on 21 October 1992.

== History ==
Ilfracombe was constructed in the early 1890s as the residence of Andrew Wilson's sister-in-law, Margaret Blair and her family, adjacent to Wilson's own residence, Doon Villa.

The original township of Maryborough was situated, not in its current place, but on the north of the Mary River, after wharves were established in 1847–48 providing transport for wool from sheep stations on the Burnett River. In 1850 surveyor Hugh Roland Labatt arrived in Maryborough with instructions to "examine the River Mary ... to suggest ...t he best site or sites for the laying out of the town, having regard to the convenience of shipping on one hand and internal communication on the other ... also ... point out the spots desirable as reserves for public building, church, quay and for places for public recreation." The site recommended by Labatt was not where settlement was established but further east and from the early 1850s this is where the growing town developed. During the 1860s an 1870s, Maryborough flourished as the principal port of Gympie where gold was discovered in 1867.

Andrew Heron Wilson arrived in Maryborough in about 1866 and established the Maryborough Sawmills, where he worked for many years before joining in partnership R Hart and J Bartholemew, and constructing a larger sawmill for Wilson, Hart and Co., as the partnership was known, in 1881. He retired from milling after only two years at his new mill. Wilson was a large investor in Gympie gold mining and was a director of the Monkland South Glanmire Company and also of the Maryborough Building Society. He was a member of the Queensland Legislative Council from 19 September 1883 until his death on 29 August 1906.

In about 1882 Wilson acquired the property on which he constructed his residence, a large timber house, known as Doon Villa overlooking the Mary River. This was an impressive house and an early history of Maryborough considers it one of the residential jewels of Maryborough, and indeed of Queensland. Wilson planned an impressive garden around the house. He constructed a bowling green for use by a lawn bowls club at his home, the oldest in Queensland.

In 1889 Wilson and his wife went on an extended holiday, first to England and then to New Zealand, where they visited Mrs Wilson's sister, Margaret Blair and her children. Margaret Blair's husband, Robert, died on 18 February 1893 and his wife and children left New Zealand and went to live with the Wilsons at Doon Villa in Maryborough. Wilson is thought to have managed the construction of a new house, called Blairholme, for his wife's sister and her four children. Wilson purchased the land, being section 2 on Allotment 147, adjacent to Doon Villa's Sections 3 and 4, on which Blairholme was built in 1891 and the house is thought to have been built sometime after Mrs Blair's arrival in 1893. Wilson's involvement with the timber and iron industries in Maryborough may explain the absence of tender notices for the construction of the house, which has made identification of an architect difficult. It is suggested that the architect of Blairholme was from Rockhampton. By 1895 the house was completed and the Blair family were in residence.

The death of Andrew Wilson on 29 August 1906 resulted in his land being transferred to Queensland Trustees Limited as a condition of his will, although it appears that the Blair family remained in the house until 1935 when the allotments were subdivided and sold. Hugh Keys bought the property on which Blairholme stood and, two years later, on 8 March 1937, this property was transferred to James Richard Lambert Hyne, a member of another prominent local timber milling family company.

The Hyne family were descendant from Richard Matthews Hyne who arrived in Maryborough and established himself as the publican of the Royal Hotel in about 1873. Hyne realised that Maryborough was an emerging municipality as the port of the flourishing Wide Bay-Burnett region and Gympie goldfields. He became interested in establishing institutions in the town and helped improved health, education, welfare and recreational facilities in the area. Hyne was mayor of Maryborough for a year in 1878. The Hyne family have a long interest in the local timber milling industry and their family company continues to this day.

The Hyne family had a family home in Lennox Street called Ilfracombe and when they bought Blairholme the name was transferred from this earlier residence. On the death of his father the property was transferred to Warren Henry Hyne who retains the house. In 2012 ownership was transferred to Rod and Sue Grieves who are now reside there with their family. The building has been altered over its life with rear sections removed and replaced. Internally, many changes have been made including extending the kitchen area both into the space of the verandah and into an extension of the house.

== Description ==
Ilfracombe is a large one-storeyed timber constructed overlooking, to the east, a reach of the Mary River. Access to the house is via a laneway from the northern end of Lennox Street, with the building concealed from the street. Surrounding the house is a large garden which includes several established trees and plantings.

The house is a timber-framed building clad with horizontal timber weatherboards. The corrugated iron roof of the building, which incorporates an attic, is quite complex, reflecting the complexity of the internal planning. The roof scape comprises a number of asymmetrically arranged and variously sized gabled and hipped sections, with a steeply pitched mansard roof over the attic, which is surmounted with a decorative cast iron balustrade, with projecting finials from the corners. Surmounting the gabled ends are similar cast iron finials. The house is lined on three sides by bull-nosed verandahs although some of these have been infilled.

Generally the building has high quality joinery and craftsmanship; several projecting bay windows are filled with etched and coloured glass panels and the external joinery is of fine quality.

Internally the building generally has timber boarded floors, walls and ceilings. Occasionally the size or orientation of timber boarding varies indicating that much of the house may have been papered or otherwise lined internally when constructed. The interior is arranged around a central vestibule from which hallways lead to the principal entrance to the south and to the kitchen on the west. Many original features remain intact, including a fine anaglypta lined vaulted ceiling in the drawing room; internal doors and other joinery; a fine fireplace with painted tiles, despite many internal alterations.

== Heritage listing ==
Ilfracombe was listed on the Queensland Heritage Register on 21 October 1992 having satisfied the following criteria.

The place is important in demonstrating the evolution or pattern of Queensland's history.

Ilfracombe was constructed between 1893 and 1895 as the residence Margaret Blair, who was the sister-in-law of Andrew Heron Wilson on whose land the house was built, adjacent to his own residence. The house demonstrates the growth of Maryborough in the late nineteenth century and, in particular, this section of Maryborough which developed as a residential area for large timber homes overlooking a reach of the Mary River.

The place is important in demonstrating the principal characteristics of a particular class of cultural places.

The building is a fine and characteristic example of a large timber home built in Queensland in the late nineteenth century.

The place is important because of its aesthetic significance.

The building is a fine and characteristic example of a large timber home built in Queensland in the late nineteenth century.

The place has a special association with the life or work of a particular person, group or organisation of importance in Queensland's history.

The building is associated with prominent Maryborough families, the Wilsons and the Hynes.
