= John Norman (Australian politician) =

Australian politician

Member of the Queensland Legislative Assembly for Maryborough
- In office 11 Mar 1902 – 18 May 1907 Serving with Charles Barton, Henry Garde, William Mitchell
- Preceded by: John Bartholomew
- Succeeded by: John Adamson

Personal details
- Born: John Norman; 1855 Ayrshire, Scotland
- Died: 11 July 1912 (aged 56) Maryborough, Queensland, Australia
- Resting place: Maryborough Cemetery
- Party: Kidstonites
- Other political affiliations: Labour Party
- Spouse: Maggie Laurie
- Occupation: Tailor

John Norman (1855 - 11 July 1912) was a member of the Queensland Legislative Assembly.

== Biography ==
Norman was born at Ayrshire, Scotland, the son of John Norman and his wife Margaret (née Wallace). He did his apprenticeship as a tailor in Scotland and when he arrived in Australia in 1883 he opened a tailor's shop in Maryborough.

He was married to Maggie Laurie and together had five sons and four daughters. Norman died in July 1912 and his funeral proceeded from his former residence in Thomas Street, Tinana to the Maryborough Cemetery.

== Public career ==
Norman, a member of the Labour Party, was an alderman on the Maryborough City Council for ten years from 1891 and in 1901 was the mayor of Maryborough. He then stood for the two-member seat of Maryborough in the Queensland Legislative Assembly at the 1893 Queensland colonial election but was beaten by the Ministerialist John Annear and Oppositionist Charles Powers.

He next stood at the 1896 Queensland colonial election and again was beaten, this time by the Ministerialist pairing of John Annear and John Bartholomew. He did not stand in 1899 but three years later, at the 1902 Queensland state election, he and fellow Labour member Charles Barton won both positions as the members for Maryborough. He represented the electorate until 1907 when he stood as a Kidstonite at that year's state election but was beaten into fourth place.

Parliament of Queensland
Preceded by John Bartholomew	Member for Maryborough; 1902–1907; Served alongside: Charles Barton, Henry Garde, William Mitchell	Succeeded by John Adamson
