= Charles Nielson =

Australian politician

The Honourable Charles Nielson
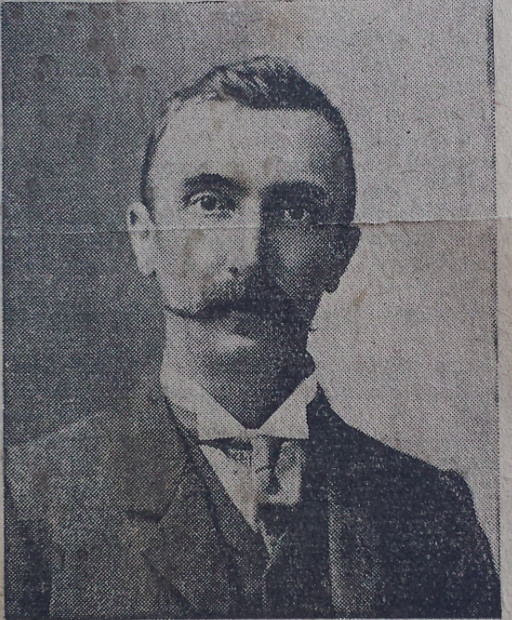

Member of the Queensland Legislative Assembly for Musgrave
- In office 27 August 1904 – 18 May 1907
- Preceded by: John White
- Succeeded by: John White

Member of the Queensland Legislative Council
- In office 14 September 1907 – 23 March 1922; Life councillorship

Personal details
- Born: Charles Frederick Nielson; 6 February 1871 Schleswig-Holstein, Prussia, German Empire
- Died: 15 August 1924 (aged 53) Gympie, Queensland, Australia
- Resting place: Bundaberg Cemetery
- Party: Labor (until 1907); Ministerialist (1907–1922)
- Spouse: Ellen Horniblow (m. 1898)
- Children: 3
- Education: Maryborough Grammar School
- Occupation: Solicitor; Politician

Charles Frederick Nielson (6 February 1871 – 15 August 1924) was a solicitor, and member of both the Queensland Legislative Council and Queensland Legislative Assembly.

== Early years ==
Nielson was born at Schleswig, Germany, to Peter Nielson and his wife, Magdalena (née Fredericksen). He started his schooling in Hamburg before his family migrated to Australia and he continued his education in Bundaberg and at Maryborough Grammar School before commencing practice as a solicitor.

== Business career ==
He was a partner in Hamilton and Nielson, Solicitors, and a director of several companies including the Bundaberg Foundry Co., the Blair Athol Coal and Timber Co., the Bundaberg Newspaper Co., and the Yeppoon Plantation Estate Co. Ltd.

== Political career ==
Representing the Labour Party, Nielson contested the seat of Musgrave at the 1902 state election, losing to the Ministerialist candidate, William O'Connell. After O'Connell died in 1903, Nielson contested the subsequent by-election, this time losing to the Opposition candidate, John White.

Nielson's third attempt at winning Musgrave came at the 1904 state election, this time defeating White. He held the seat for three years before White regained it at the 1907 state election. In September of that year, he was appointed by the Kidston Ministry to the Legislative Council and remained a member till the council was abolished in March 1922.

== Personal life ==
Nielson married Ellen Horniblow in 1898 and together they had three sons. He died at Gympie in 1924 and was buried in the Bundaberg Cemetery.

Parliament of Queensland
Preceded by John White	Member for Musgrave; 1904–1907	Succeeded by John White
