= Charles Barton (Queensland politician) =

Australian politician

Member of the Queensland Legislative Assembly for Maryborough
- In office 11 March 1902 – 16 June 1902 Serving with John Norman
- Preceded by: John Annear
- Succeeded by: Henry Garde

Personal details
- Born: Charles Hastings Barton; 1 January 1829 Geneva, Switzerland
- Died: 16 June 1902 (aged 73) Maryborough, Queensland, Australia
- Resting place: Maryborough Cemetery
- Party: Labour Party
- Spouse(s): Catherine Basedow, Elisabeth Basedow
- Relations: Geoffrey Barton (brother)
- Education: University of Oxford
- Occupation: School teacher

Charles Hastings Barton (1 January 1829 - 16 June 1902) was a member of the Queensland Legislative Assembly.

== Biography ==
Barton was born in Geneva, Switzerland, the son of Charles Cutts Barton and his wife Emillia Ann Barton (née Middleton). His brother was Geoffrey Barton, who was to become a Major-general in the British Army. He was educated at Eton College and Christ Church, Oxford, where he matriculated in 1848 and graduated B.A. in 1852.

In 1853 Barton emigrated to Adelaide, where he was a Bachelor of Arts tutor and took up sheep farming and winegrowing. He became editor and part-owner of the German-language weekly Süd-Australische Zeitung, and when that was taken over in 1863 to become the Australische Zeitung, co-founded the Tanunda Deutsche Zeitung with Friedrich Basedow, with assistance from Carl Muecke. In 1864 he took over the Northern Star, which he re-launched as The Kapunda Herald. Found insolvent, he fled his South Australian creditors, and in 1867 arrived in Queensland, where he was the editor and later, the lead-writer of the Maryborough Chronicle. He then was the classics and second master at Maryborough Boys Grammar School from 1881 until 1896.

Barton was married twice, firstly to Catharine M. Basedow whom he married at Tanunda in 1859 and together had a son and three daughters. She died in 1863; he then married Catherine's sister, Elisabeth Basedow, also in Tanunda and this marriage produced another two sons and five daughters. Barton died in Maryborough in June 1902 and his funeral proceeded from his Kent Street residence to the Maryborough Cemetery.

== Public career ==
Barton, representing the Labour Party, won one of the two positions for the two-member seat of Maryborough at the 1902 Queensland state election. He served alongside John Norman, also of the Labour Party. Barton died three months after the election and before he could take his seat in the House.

== Family ==
C. H. Barton married Catharine Magdalena Basedow (died 1863) in 1859. Their children were:

- Charles (1860– )
- Harriet Catharine (1861–1862)
- Emily Harriette (1862– )
- Catharine (1863–1863)

He married Anna Elisabeth Basedow in 1865

The Basedow sisters were daughters of Christian Friedrich Basedow (died 1886), who with his large family emigrated to South Australia on the Vesta, arriving in August 1856 and settled in Tanunda. Christian Friedrich may have been a brother of Martin Peter Friedrich Basedow MP.

Parliament of Queensland
Preceded by John Annear	Member for Maryborough; 1902; Served alongside: John Norman	Succeeded by John Norman
