= Henry James Hyne =

Australian businessman and politician

H.J. Hyne
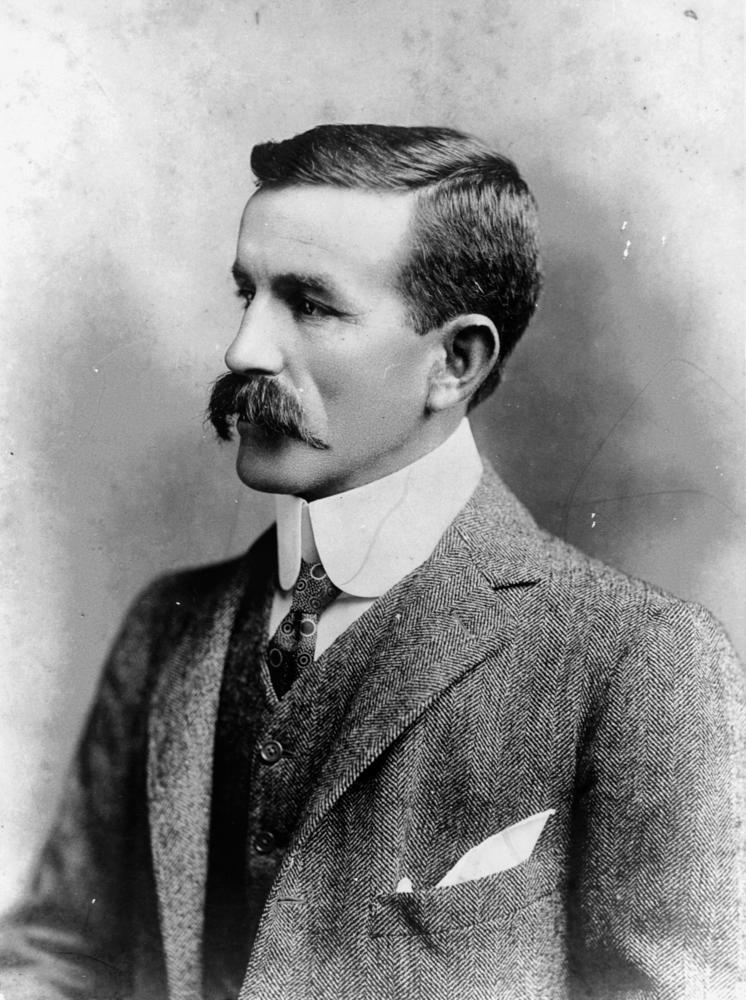
- Henry James Hyne, ca. 1901.
- Born: 1867
- Died: 1936 (aged 68–69)
- Occupations: Politician; Businessman

Henry James Hyne (1867–1936) was an Australian businessman and the mayor of Maryborough, Queensland from 1913 to 1918.

== Early life ==
Henry Hyne was born in 1867 in Queensland, the son of Richard Matthews Hyne and his wife Elizabeth (née Lambert). He was educated at the Maryborough Grammar School.

== Timber industry ==
He entered his father's sawmill business in 1888. After his father's death in 1902, he took over as general manager and ran the company (Hyne & Son) until 1929.

== Politics ==
He was mayor of the City of Maryborough from 1913 to 1918.

== Other ==
Henry Hyne owned the Ayrshire cattle stud, Coolreagh.

== Death ==
Henry Hyne died in 1936.
