= Charles McGhie =

Australian politician (1839–1917)

The Hon Charles McGhie
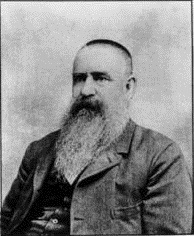

Member of the Queensland Legislative Council
- In office 4 May 1904 – 21 January 1917

Personal details
- Born: Charles Stewart McGhie; 17 May 1839 Wigtown, Dumfries and Galloway, Scotland
- Died: 21 January 1917 (aged 77) Maryborough, Queensland, Australia
- Resting place: Maryborough Cemetery
- Spouse: Maria Holmes (m.1866 d.1904)
- Occupation: Shipwright, newspaper proprietor, railway employee

Charles Stewart McGhie (17 May 1839 – 21 January 1917) was a shipwright, newspaper proprietor, and member of the Queensland Legislative Council.

== Early years ==
McGhie was born at Wigtown, Dumfries and Galloway, Scotland, in 1863 to William McGhie and his wife Elizabeth (née Stewart) and attended a local Government school. After spending his early manhood at sea, he settled in Queensland. On his arrival, he joined the Railways, which became his career for the next thirty years.

== Political life ==
McGhie became actively interested in politics and was one of the pioneers of the Labour movement in Maryborough becoming a partner in the local labour newspaper, The Alert. He was an alderman, serving for nine years and was mayor of Maryborough in 1898.

In 1899, he represented the Labour Party in standing for the two-member state seat of Maryborough, coming fourth behind the two Ministerialists, Annear and Bartholomew.

McGhie was appointed by the Morgan ministry to the Queensland Legislative council in May 1904, serving for over 12 years till his death in 1917.

== Personal life ==
McGhie married Maria Holmes in April 1866 and together they had nine children. Dying in 1917, his funeral proceeded from his residence in Ferry Street to the Maryborough Cemetery.
