= William Mitchell (Australian politician) =

Australian politician

Member of the Queensland Legislative Assembly for Maryborough
- In office 27 August 1904 – 2 Oct 1909 Serving with John Norman, John Adamson
- Preceded by: Henry Garde
- Succeeded by: Edward Corser

Personal details
- Born: William Mitchell; March 1850 Falkirk, Scotland
- Died: 21 May 1923 (aged 73) Maryborough, Queensland, Australia
- Resting place: Maryborough Cemetery
- Party: Labour Party
- Spouse: Helen Allen Roughead (d.1919)
- Occupation: Bookshop owner

William Mitchell (March 1850 - 21 May 1923) was a member of the Queensland Legislative Assembly.

== Biography ==
Mitchell was born at Falkirk, Scotland, the son of Robert Mitchell and his wife Mary (née Heggie). He was privately educated and also attended night school before beginning work at the Falkirk Iron Works at the age of 16. He then became a publisher and carried on this pursuit after he arrived in Queensland around 1882 before opening a bookshop in Maryborough.

He married Helen Allen Roughead (died 1919) in Falkirk and together had a son and two daughters. He died in Maryborough in May 1923 with his funeral proceeding from his residence in Ferry Street to the Maryborough Cemetery.

== Public career ==
After spending time as an alderman on Maryborough City Council, Mitchell, a member of the Labour Party stood for the seat of Maryborough at the 1899 Queensland colonial election but finished in last place behind the other four contestants. He ran again at the 1904 state election and this time, successfully as both he and fellow Labour candidate John Norman won positions in the two member electorate.

Mitchell remained the member for Maryborough until the state election of 1909 when both the Labour members lost their seat in parliament. He stood again in 1912 but lost to Edward Corser by three votes. Mitchell appealed the decision and another election was ordered for October that year. At the October election, the first count ended in a tied vote, with both Corser and Mitchell polling 1,792 votes. A recount was ordered and the result was Corser had won by two votes.

Parliament of Queensland
Preceded by Henry Garde	Member for Maryborough; 1904–1909; Served alongside: John Norman, John Adamson	Succeeded by Edward Corser
