= William Demaine =

Australian politician

The Hon William Demaine
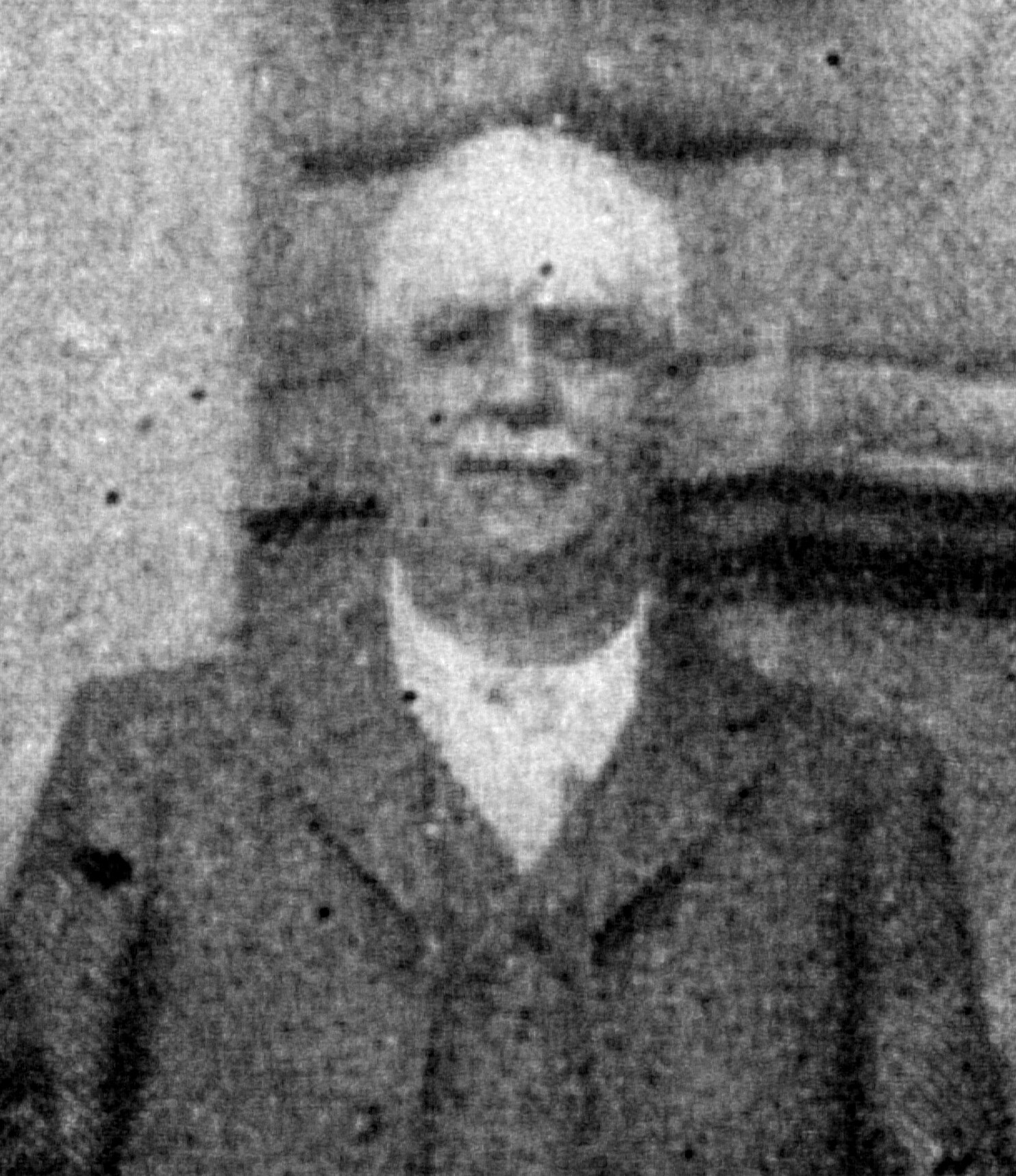
- William Halliwell Demaine at the Governor General's Conference, 1918

Member of the Queensland Legislative Council
- In office 10 October 1917 – 23 March 1922

Member of the Queensland Legislative Assembly for Maryborough
- In office 27 February 1937 – 2 April 1938
- Preceded by: James Stopford
- Succeeded by: David Farrell

Personal details
- Born: William Halliwell Demaine; 25 February 1859 Bradford, Yorkshire, England
- Died: 18 August 1939 (aged 80) Maryborough, Queensland, Australia
- Resting place: Maryborough Cemetery
- Party: Labor
- Spouse: Mary Susannah Preston (m.1880 d.1942)
- Occupation: Newspaper editor, trade union official

William Halliwell Demaine (25 February 1859 – 18 August 1939) was a newspaper editor, trade union official, and member of both the Queensland Legislative Council and the Queensland Legislative Assembly.

== Early life ==
Demaine was born at Bradford, Yorkshire, to parents Joseph Demaine, cabinetmaker, and Elizabeth (née Halliwell). At around age 15, he went with his family to Uruguay and Argentina where he worked as a printer, returning to England in 1879. He landed in Queensland in March 1880 and began work as a joiner for Fairlie & Sons and within two years had formed an Eight Hour Association and participated in a campaign to remove black labour from the sugar industry.

Leaving Fairlie & Sons in 1890, he set about forming the General Labourers' Union, which was later absorbed into the Australian Workers' Union and as Secretary of the Wide Bay and Burnett Branch of the Australian Labor Federation, he helped organize support for the shearers in the 1891 strike.

In 1892, Demaine represented the Maryborough Workers' Political Organization at the first Labor-in-Politics convention before being elected to the central political executive in 1892–94. Along with Charles McGhie, he founded the weekly newspaper Alert which he edited until his death. In 1901 he once again attended the Labor-in-Politics convention and until 1938, every convention thereafter. Elected president of the central political executive in 1916, he held the role unopposed for the next 22 years.

== Political career ==
When the Labour Party starting forming governments in Queensland, it found much of its legislation being blocked by a hostile Council, where members had been appointed for life by successive conservative governments. After a failed referendum in May 1917, Premier Ryan tried a new tactic, and later that year advised the Governor, Sir Hamilton John Goold-Adams, to appoint thirteen new members whose allegiance lay with Labour to the council.

Demaine was one of the 13 new members, and went on to serve for four and a half years until the council was abolished in March 1922. He was also an alderman on the Maryborough City Council on two separate occasions – 1896 to 1900 and 1924–1939, serving as mayor from 1933 until his death in 1939.

When James Stopford, the member for the state seat of Maryborough died in November 1936, Demaine, as the Labor candidate, easily won the resultant by-election held on 27 February 1937, becoming the oldest person to enter Queensland Parliament. He held the seat for just over a year before deciding not to stand at the 1938 state election.

== Personal life ==
At Bradford on 10 January 1880, Demaine married Mary Susannah Preston and together had nine children. Demaine died at Maryborough on 18 August 1939. He was awarded a state funeral, and buried in Maryborough Cemetery.

Parliament of Queensland
Preceded by James Stopford	Member for Maryborough; 1937–1938	Succeeded by David Farrell
