= John Adamson (Queensland politician) =

Australian politician

John Adamson CBE
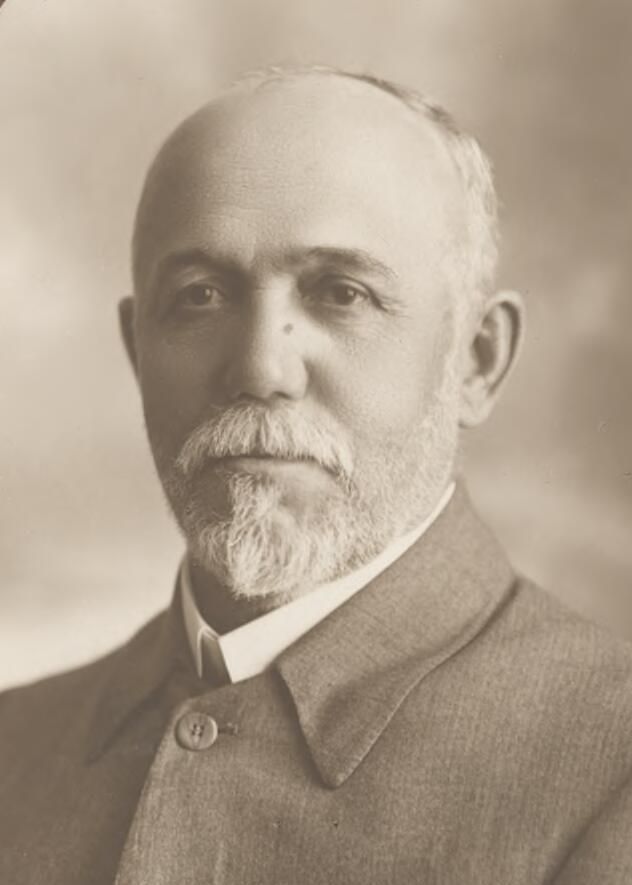

Senator for Queensland
- In office 1 July 1920 – 2 May 1922
- Succeeded by: John MacDonald

Member of the Queensland Legislative Assembly for Maryborough
- In office 18 May 1907 – 2 October 1909 Serving with William Mitchell
- Preceded by: John Norman
- Succeeded by: Charles Booker

Member of the Queensland Legislative Assembly for Rockhampton
- In office 25 February 1911 – 21 March 1917 Serving with Kenneth Grant
- Preceded by: William Kidston
- Succeeded by: Frank Forde

Personal details
- Born: John Adamson; 18 February 1857 Tudhoe, Durham, England
- Died: 2 May 1922 (aged 65) Hendra, Queensland, Australia
- Resting place: Toowong Cemetery
- Party: Labor (1907–17); National (state) (1917–22); Nationalist (federal) (1917–22)
- Spouse: Caroline Jones (m.1884 d.1932)
- Occupation: Shoemaker, Blacksmith, Religious minister

John Adamson CBE (18 February 1857 – 2 May 1922) was an English-born Australian politician.

== Early life ==
Born in Durham, he received a primary education before becoming a shoemaker, blacksmith and lay preacher. He migrated to Australia in 1878, becoming a Methodist minister in Queensland.

== Politics ==
At the 1907 election, Adamson was elected to the Legislative Assembly of Queensland as the Labour member for Maryborough, serving until 2 October 1909 (the 1909 election).

On 25 February 1911, he was elected as the member for Rockhampton, serving until 21 March 1917. He was Secretary for Railways from 1 June 1915 to 2 October 1916. Adamson left the Labor Party in the wake of the 1916 split over conscription, joining the National Party.

In 1919, he was part of the formation of a brief-lived state National Labor Party and then he was elected to the Australian Senate as a Nationalist Senator for Queensland. He served in the Senate from 1 July 1920 until his death on 2 May 1922. Following his death, the Queensland Government (then controlled by the Australian Labor Party) appointed John MacDonald, a Labor member, as his replacement.

== Death ==
Adamson died in 1922 after he fell in front of a train at Hendra railway station. Reports at the time suggested suicide as he had been suffering from illness and depression for some time. He was accorded a state funeral which proceeded from the Albert Street Methodist Church to the Toowong Cemetery.

Parliament of Queensland
Preceded by John Norman	Member for Maryborough; 1907–1909; Served alongside: William Mitchell	Succeeded by Charles Booker
Preceded by William Kidston	Member for Rockhampton; 1911–1917; Served alongside: Kenneth Grant	Succeeded by Frank Forde
