= John White (Queensland politician) =

Australian politician

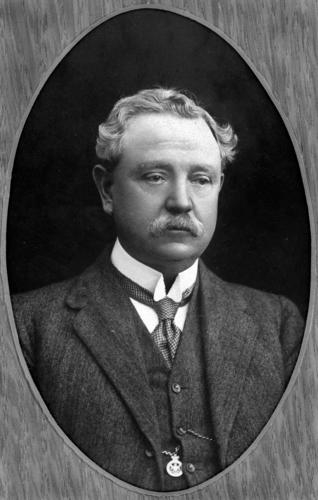

Member of the Queensland Legislative Assembly for Musgrave
- In office 4 April 1903 – 27 August 1904
- Preceded by: William O'Connell
- Succeeded by: Charles Nielson
- In office 18 May 1907 – 22 May 1915
- Preceded by: Charles Nielson
- Succeeded by: Thomas Armfield

Personal details
- Born: John White; 9 November 1853 Dumbarton, Scotland
- Died: 13 June 1922 (aged 68) Bundaberg, Queensland, Australia
- Resting place: Bundaberg Cemetery
- Party: Ministerialist
- Other political affiliations: Opposition
- Spouse: Maggie Frame (m.1877 d.1901)
- Occupation: Company director

John White (9 November 1853 – 13 June 1922) was a member of the Queensland Legislative Assembly.

== Early life ==
As the son of Alexander and his wife Ellen (née Anderson), White was born in Dumbarton, Scotland. He was a company director and was involved in several businesses.

On 10 April 1877, he married Maggie Frame (died 1901) and had one son and three daughters. White died in Bundaberg in June 1922 and was buried in the Bundaberg Cemetery.

== Public life ==
White, representing the Ministerialists, won the 1903 by-election for the seat of Musgrave in the Queensland Assembly, replacing William O'Connell who had died in March of that year. He only held the seat until the next year at the 1904 state election when he was defeated by Labour's Charles Nielson.

In 1907, White won back the seat against Nielson. He remained a member of Musgrave until 1915 when he was once again beaten, this time by Thomas Armfield of the Labor Party. He stood again at the 1918 state election but was once again defeated. During his time in the parliament, he was the Secretary for Agriculture and Stock in 1912–1915.

Parliament of Queensland
Preceded by William O'Connell	Member for Musgrave; 1903–1904	Succeeded by Charles Nielson
Preceded by Charles Nielson	Member for Musgrave; 1907–1915	Succeeded by Thomas Armfield
