= Royal Hotel, Maryborough =

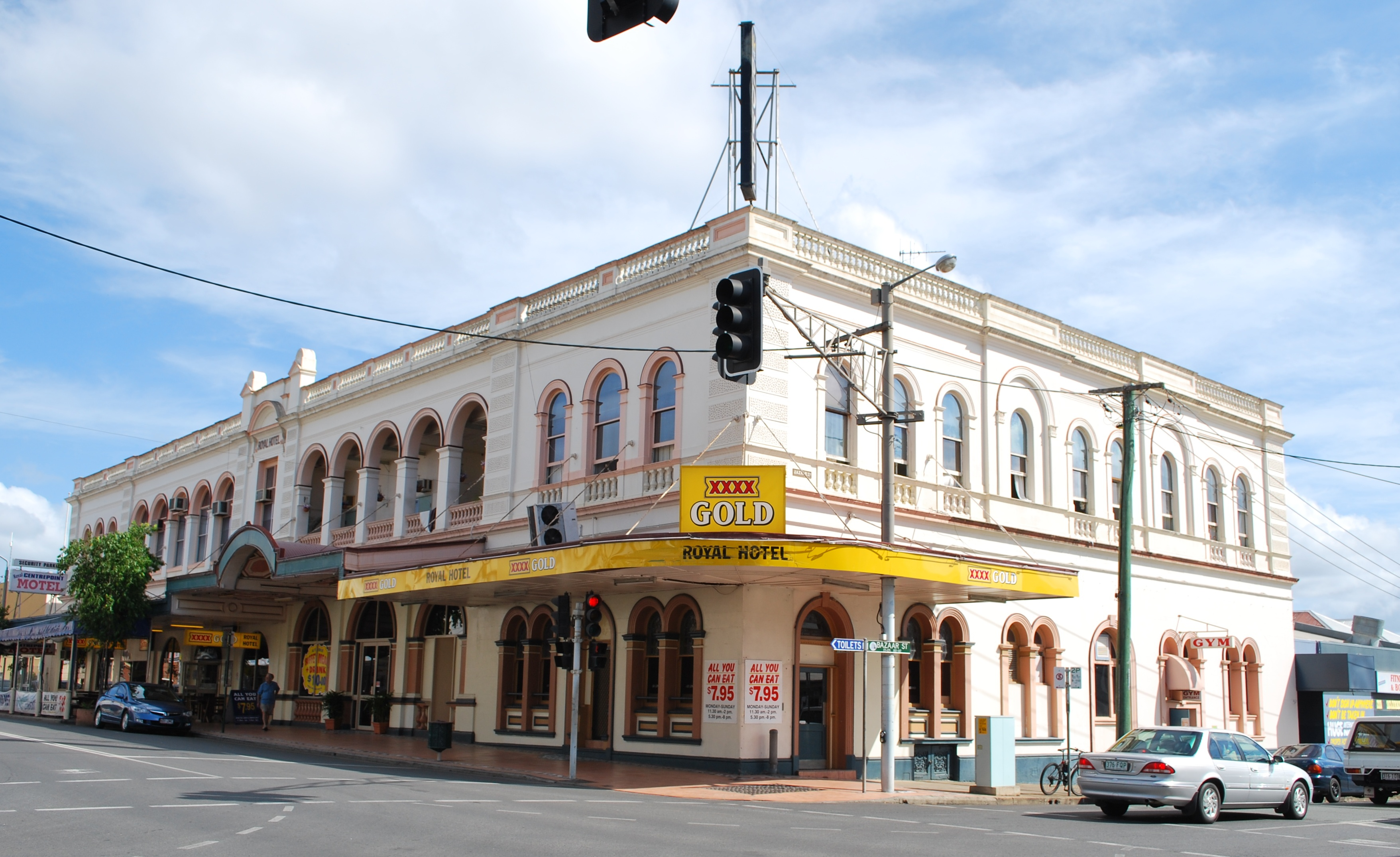
- Royal Hotel, 2008

- Location within Queensland
- 25.5389°S 152.7035°E
- Location: Kent Street, Maryborough, Fraser Coast Region, Queensland, Australia

History
- Design period: 1870s–1890s (late 19th century)
- Built: 1892–1930s

Site notes
- Architect: Eaton & Bates
- Architectural style: Classicism

Queensland Heritage Register
- Official name: Royal Hotel
- Type: state heritage (built)
- Designated: 21 October 1992
- Reference no.: 600700
- Significant period: 1890s, 1900s, 1930s (fabric); 1902–ongoing (historical use as hotel)
- Significant components: loggia/s, shop/s

Royal Hotel is a heritage-listed hotel on the corner of Kent Street and Bazaar Street, Maryborough, Fraser Coast Region, Queensland, Australia. It was designed by Eaton & Bates and built from 1892 to 1930s. It was added to the Queensland Heritage Register on 21 October 1992.

== History ==
The Royal Hotel in Maryborough is a substantial rendered brick building, constructed in 1902 to designs of Messrs Eaton and Bates, architects of Rockhampton. The present hotel was built for Richard Hyne, a local pioneer who developed many local manufacturing and community initiatives.

The original township of Maryborough was situated, not in its current place, but on the north of the Mary River, after wharves were established in 1847–1848, to provide transport for wool from sheep stations on the Burnett River. In 1852 the growing town was gradually transferred further north where ships were able to better navigate the river. Development followed and by March 1861, Maryborough was declared a municipality, the Borough of Maryborough.

One of the early settlers in the area, Mr ET Aldridge established a hotel, apparently first known as the Victoria but later named the Bush Inn, in the old town in 1848. In 1856, Aldridge moved the hotel to the south of the River in Kent Street, where the present Royal Hotel is situated, with the shifting of the focus of development. This was a large two storeyed timber building.

During the 1860s Maryborough flourished as a result of the gold discoveries in Gympie, for which it became the primary port. In 1870 a first floor timber balcony with cross-braced balustrade was added to the Bush Inn, which was to become known as the Royal Hotel in the next few years, by the owner, Mr Cooper. In 1873, Richard Hyne took over the licence.

Prior to establishing himself in Maryborough, Hyne engaged in various businesses in Gympie, including the running of the Mining Exchange Hotel. Astutely, he realised that Maryborough would become a permanent centre and port for the Wide Bay–Burnett district and moved to the town, where he immediately became involved with the running of the Bush Inn/Royal Hotel. Hyne was interested in establishing Maryborough as a major respected centre, and worked towards improving health, education, welfare and recreation facilities. He was mayor for a term in 1878.

Upon arriving in Maryborough, Hyne acquired the lease of the Royal Hotel in mid 1873 and purchased the hotel soon after. Hyne busied himself with improving the hotel, he added bathrooms and replaced the timber balustrading on the balconies with a cast iron balustrade and established a driveway where he planted several bunya pines in 1878. This former Royal Hotel did not occupy the site immediately adjacent to the corner, and a two storeyed masonry building was constructed by Hyne on this corner site in 1892–1893. This two storeyed building, which was to be incorporated into the current Royal Hotel, was designed by William Devon, a local architect as a shop for Hanleys, drapers in the town. Hanleys remained in the shop for about five years, when Finlaysons took over the lease until the shop became the public bar of the new Royal Hotel in 1902.

As the town continued to prosper, the Royal Hotel soon became the leading hotel establishment, and many important civic functions were held there. By 1900 the question of modernising the hotel arose. In a letter to Hyne from a relative in Glasgow, the latter suggests that plans be acquired for the best use of the site, with a corner bar, sitting rooms and an imposing front entrance, preferably further away from the public bar, as "this area is always objectionable to Ladies". Other suggestions included the filling in of the front with shops and the provision of accommodation for 40 on the first floor.

A decision was duly taken to rebuild the Royal Hotel, and a competition of Queensland architects was held, from which eight entries were received and Messrs Eaton and Bates were chosen. The design competition specified that the new hotel was to incorporate "the best features of the Oriental Hotel in Colombo and Shepheards Hotel in Cairo". Though the final design was obviously not as elaborate as either of the hotels cited, it does have many features which could be loosely described as having eastern origin, in particular the open entrance, first floor loggias and the stair hall with their openness, arcades and tiling. The drawings which survive from this competition, now in the hands of the Hyne family, are signed by Messrs Eaton, Bates and Garlick.

When constructed the Royal Hotel was described as one of the finest hotels north of Sydney and the most complete in Australia. It incorporated the building on the corner of Kent and Bazaar Streets and extended along Kent Street with the principal entrance on this facade. Through this was a large entrance vestibule, open to the street through wide archways, beyond which was the extravagant stair hall. A large dining room, to the right of the stair hall, extended through two stories, with a gallery encircling the room at the first floor level and a large clerestoried ceiling section. Elsewhere on the ground floor was a large billiard room, the bar area, on the corner of the streets, and sample rooms for the requirements of commercial travellers. The bar area incorporated a public bar, two parlours and two private bars, all of which could be served from the same counter. On the first floor accommodation facilities were provided, those facing Kent Street opening onto a long arched loggia. Shops were found on the ground floor of the Kent Street elevation.

The hotel was not fully completed when Richard Hyne died on 5 July 1902, but action had been taken by this stage to move to the new hotel.

Many parts of the hotel was refurbished during the 1930s. The lounge was renovated in 1932, under the supervision of local architect POE Hawkes, when a timber floor and wall panelling was introduced, and fibrous cement was used to clad the ceiling. A variety of locally grown hardwood timbers, including mountain ash, red gum, spotted gum and iron bark supplied by Hyne and Son timber merchants, were used to create the striking parquetry floor. Tenders were called, again by architect Philip Oliver Ellard Hawkes, on 21 September 1934 for the erection of a cantilevered awning clad with Wunderlich pressed metal panels to the front of the hotel, though this was not erected until 1939, when the shop fronts were modernised. This work was completed by local contractor, SV Stevens, and a stipulation of the contract was the employment of only local labour.

The hotel remained in the ownership of the Hyne family until 1960, when it was sold to another established Maryborough family, the Williams. The shops to the Kent Street elevation remain, and a family restaurant is situated in the entrance and dining room.

== Description ==
The Royal Hotel is a substantial two-storeyed rendered masonry building on a prominent intersection on the corner of Kent and Bazaar Streets, Maryborough. The hipped corrugated iron roof, featuring a prominent glazed roof lantern, is concealed by a rendered masonry parapet of Italianate balusters, punctuated by a series of moulded panels.

The principal facade, from Kent Street, is symmetrically composed around a central bay surmounted by a curved pediment above a moulded panel projecting above the parapet, emphasising the entrance. The symmetrical quality of the facade is offset by the addition of a cantilevered awning which features an arched detail, not over the principal entrance designated by the central bay, but over on an arched opening to the right of this. The central bay is flanked by a series of arcaded bays, divided by pilasters rendered to imitate vermiculated stonework. The ground floor features a series of large arched openings, some of which are balustraded, and flanking these are bipartite round headed arched windows to the public bar toward Bazaar Street, and modernised shop fronts in the other direction. The central bay is flanked on the first floor by five bay arched loggias terminated by the end wings of the building which feature three arched window openings, over an italianate baluster panel. The first floor loggia provides an indication of the original open character of the central section of the ground floor.

The cantilevered awning which is attached to the building with a series of iron tie-backs, has an elaborate soffit of coffered pressed metal panels and a reeded pressed metal fascia. The awning extends the whole distance of the Kent Street facade, is curved around the corner and extends only a short distance on the Bazaar Street facade. Surmounted on the Kent and Bazaar Street corner of the hotel is an illuminated sign supported on metal framework with lettering, "ROYAL".

Windows to the first floor nearest the corner of Kent and Bazaar Streets retain double hung sashes, though most other openings in the building have been glazed with aluminium-framed windows. Leadlight glazing survives on the upper sashes of several arched windows of the public bar. Window joinery to the Bazaar Street elevation is generally more intact. The building has a rear first floor verandah, access from which is gained by a straight timber stair.

The building is accessed via the centrally located principal entrance, originally an open loggia entrance vestibule, but now closed with glazing. This space features a fine tessellated and encaustic tiled floor, which continues in less decorative form into the entrance hall and dining room. The entrance hall is punctuated by an arcade supported on heavy masonry columns with stylised ionic capitals, initiating the stair and forming a walkway through the space, indicating the entrances to other rooms. The bifurcating dog leg stair features very fine cedar joinery of carved timber balusters joined by a carved panel below the handrail. Heavy columns flanking the stair are met by the expanding lower treads and the wreathed handrail.

The dining room, originally extending through two storeys with gallery above, is now ceiled at the first floor. The coved ceiling of the gallery space features a large central clerestory, now boarded below the windows. Reeded pilasters line the plaster walls, and access to the loggia is given through a number of half glazed french doors.

The upper floor has a number of accommodation rooms, all with access to the loggia or rear verandah. The timber framed and boarded rooms retain original detailing including four panel doors, with timber fretwork transoms above and timber skirting and architraves. A large clerestory in the corridor provides natural lighting.

The public bar and subsidiary ground floor rooms have been substantially altered. A one storeyed concrete block extension has been added to the south of the Bazaar Street elevation. To the rear of the early building is an area of partially surfaced car parking.

== Heritage listing ==
Royal Hotel was listed on the Queensland Heritage Register on 21 October 1992 having satisfied the following criteria.

The place is important in demonstrating the evolution or pattern of Queensland's history.

The Royal Hotel is important in demonstrating the pattern of development in Maryborough. A hotel has been on the site since the initial stages of the development of the new town of Maryborough, and the subsequent rebuildings indicate various phases of the town's prosperity.

The place is important in demonstrating the principal characteristics of a particular class of cultural places.

The hotel demonstrates the principal characteristics of a large hotel in a Queensland country town, designed to provide superior accommodation to attract travellers and local clientele. The hotel is influenced by eastern design traditions, appropriate in the sub-tropical climate of Maryborough.

The place is important because of its aesthetic significance.

The well composed exterior employing classically derived features and the finely detailed interior, of high quality planning, joinery, tiling and plaster work, contribute to an impressive building, of value for its aesthetic characteristics.

The place has a strong or special association with a particular community or cultural group for social, cultural or spiritual reasons.

The building is important to the local community and recognised as the premier hotel in Maryborough, and a centre of the town's social life since its construction in 1902.

The place has a special association with the life or work of a particular person, group or organisation of importance in Queensland's history.

The building is associated with the Hyne family, important pioneers of Maryborough and in particular with Mr RM Hyne, and also the Queensland architects, Eaton and Bates.
