= Richard Bingham Sheridan =

Australian politician (1822–1897)

Richard Sheridan
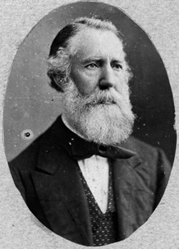

Member of the Queensland Legislative Assembly for Maryborough
- In office 17 October 1883 – 5 May 1888 Serving with John Hurley, John Annear
- Preceded by: Henry King
- Succeeded by: Richard Hyne

Personal details
- Born: Richard Bingham Sheridan; 1 August 1822 County Mayo, Ireland
- Died: 8 June 1897 (aged 74) Manly, New South Wales, Australia
- Resting place: Waverley Cemetery
- Spouse: Adele Eulalie Masse (m. 1845)
- Occupation: Public servant

Richard Bingham Sheridan (1 August 1822 – 8 June 1897) was a Queensland public servant, liberal-oriented Member of the Legislative Assembly of Queensland and government minister (minister without portfolio 1883–85 and later Post Master General in 1885).

== Early life ==
Sheridan was born at Castlebar, County Mayo, Ireland, the son of Henry S. Sheridan and his wife Margaret, née Martin. He arrived in New South Wales in 1842 and was initially employed near Twofold Bay, where he had the experience of being, on his own account, 'one of the first white men ever seen among the wild tribes'. Subsequently, he was until 1844 employed as a property manager for Captain William Oldrey of Broulee. He married on 18 November 1845, in Sydney, to Adele Eulalie Masse, a native of Mauritius.

== Public servant ==
Sheridan subsequently joined the Customs Department in Sydney in February 1846 but his illness made him be eventually transferred to Moreton Bay (Brisbane) in February 1853, where on 31 May, he became a member of the Steam Navigation Board. He later moved north to take up a position as a sub-collector of customs at Maryborough on 10 December 1859 and subsequently as a Water Police Magistrate and Immigration Agent. He thus held several key positions in the Wide Bay and Maryborough area in the period from 1859 to his retirement in about 1890.

== Volunteer roles ==
In 1873, Sheridan was appointed a foundation trustee and chairman of the Maryborough Botanic Gardens.

Sheridan was an honorary lieutenant colonel in the volunteer Queensland Defence Force.

== Politics ==
In the 1883 Queensland elections on 17 August 1883 Sheridan was elected to the Queensland Legislative Assembly in the seat of Maryborough, where he was an ally of Samuel Griffith. He was a Minister without portfolio from 13 November 1883 to 3 January 1885, after which he became briefly Postmaster-General of Queensland from 3 January 1885 to 17 February 1885. He held the seat until 5 May 1888.

== Later life ==
Sheridan retired to Brisbane but moved to Sydney in 1897, where he died at Manly on 8 June and was buried in Waverley Cemetery in accordance with his Catholic faith.

Sheridan was respected for his integrity and deep sense of fairness and humanity, and as such, he remained throughout his life a true pioneer of compassion in regard to the rights of Aboriginal people and always keenly alert to the shady sides of the infamous Melanesian labour trade. He thus protested in public against the Native Police system he would later raise his voice in defence of the rights of Melanesian labourers. In November 1873, he strongly criticised Maryborough hospital for refusing the treatment to a dying Aboriginal.

== See also ==
- Members of the Queensland Legislative Assembly, 1883–1888
- William Oldrey

Parliament of Queensland
Preceded by Henry King	Member for Maryborough; 1883–1888; Served alongside: John Hurley, John Annear	Succeeded by Richard Hyne
