= Henry Garde =

Australian politician

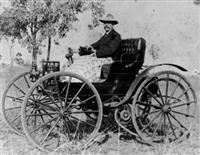
- Dr. H. C. Garde in his Holsman high wheeler, Maryborough, ca. 1908

Member of the Queensland Legislative Assembly for Maryborough
- In office 3 July 1902 – 27 August 1904 Serving with John Norman
- Preceded by: Charles Barton
- Succeeded by: William Mitchell

Personal details
- Born: Henry Croker Garde; 9 February 1855 Cloyne, County Cork, Ireland
- Died: 8 September 1932 (aged 77) Maryborough, Queensland, Australia
- Resting place: Maryborough Cemetery
- Party: Ministerialist
- Spouse: Ada Beatrice Hall (m.1886 d.1945)
- Education: Queen's University, Belfast
- Occupation: Surgeon

Henry Croker Garde (9 February 1855 – 9 August 1932) was a member of the Queensland Legislative Assembly.

== Biography ==
Garde was born in Cloyne, County Cork, the son of Thomas William Garde, who was the Church of England Rector in Cloyne, and his wife Sophia (née Colles). He was educated at Midleton College and then attended Queen's University, Belfast where he studied medicine and became a Licentiate of the Apothecaries' Hall of Ireland. In 1886, he qualified as a Fellow of the Royal College of Surgeons of Edinburgh gaining the gold medal for merit, achieving the highest pass in the examination.

After having been a ship's doctor for some time, he arrived in Maryborough, Queensland around 1879 and set up a private practice. In 1884 he was appointed the resident surgeon at the Maryborough General Hospital, remaining there until 1902. In 1911 he was once again appointed as the resident surgeon at the Maryborough General Hospital but took a leave of absence at the outbreak of World War I and joined the army. He was sent to Egypt with the rank of major and also served on hospital ships at Gallipoli. He returned to Maryborough in 1916 and resumed his post at the hospital before again resigning to once more go into private practice in 1918. He remained in the practice until ill-health forced his retirement from active work a few months before his death.

On 10 June 1886 Garde married Ada Beatrice Hall (died 1945) in Maryborough and together had a son and four daughters. He died in Maryborough in August 1932 with his funeral proceeding from his residence in John Street to the Maryborough Cemetery.

== Public career ==
Garde, representing the Ministerialists, won the by-election held in 1902 for the seat of Maryborough in the Queensland Legislative Assembly. The by-election was brought about by the death of Charles Barton who had died before taking his seat in parliament. Garde only represented the electorate for two years, being defeated at the 1904 state election by the Labour pairing of William Mitchell and John Norman.

Parliament of Queensland
Preceded by Charles Barton	Member for Maryborough; 1902–1904; Served alongside: John Norman	Succeeded by William Mitchell
