= Andrew Wilson (Australian politician) =

Australian politician

The Hon Andrew Wilson
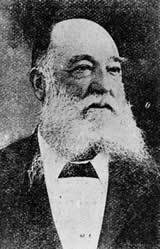

Member of the Queensland Legislative Council
- In office 19 September 1883 – 29 August 1906

Personal details
- Born: Andrew Heron Wilson; 24 August 1844 Ayr, Scotland
- Died: 29 August 1906 (aged 62) Maryborough, Queensland, Australia
- Resting place: Maryborough Cemetery
- Spouse: Jessie Adam (d. 1931)
- Occupation: Company director

Andrew Heron Wilson (24 August 1844 – 29 August 1906) was a politician in colonial Queensland, and a member of the Queensland Legislative Council.

== Early life ==
Wilson was son of Andrew Wilson and Grace (Heron) his wife, was born at Ayr, Scotland, and educated at the Ayr Academy. He emigrated to Queensland in 1864, and became a large saw-mill owner at Maryborough, Queensland. He was married at Cunning Park, Ayr, to Miss Jessie Adam.

== Politics ==
Wilson was called to the Legislative Council in 1883 where he served until his death in 1906.

== Published works ==
- Heron-Wilson, Andrew (1896), From Maryborough (Queensland) to and through New Zealand in 1891
- Heron-Wilson, Andrew (1899), From Queensland to England via China, Japan, Canada, and the United States in 1899, s.n
