= Charles Powers =

Australian politician (1853–1939)

The Right Honourable Sir Charles Powers KCMG
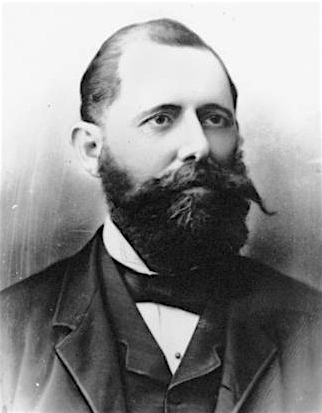
- Powers as Minister for Education in Queensland, c. 1889

Justice of the High Court of Australia
- In office 5 March 1913 – 22 July 1929
- Nominated by: Andrew Fisher
- Preceded by: none
- Succeeded by: H. V. Evatt

Member of the Queensland Legislative Assembly for Burrum
- In office 12 May 1888 – 29 April 1893
- Preceded by: New seat
- Succeeded by: Nicholas Tooth

Member of the Queensland Legislative Assembly for Maryborough
- In office 29 April 1893 – 21 March 1896 Serving with John Annear
- Preceded by: Richard Hyne
- Succeeded by: John Bartholomew

Personal details
- Born: Charles Powers; 3 March 1853 Brisbane, Colony of New South Wales
- Died: 24 April 1939 (aged 86) Melbourne, Victoria, Australia
- Resting place: Burwood Cemetery
- Party: Opposition
- Spouse: Kate Ann Thorburn (m.1878 d.1942)
- Occupation: High Court judge

Sir Charles Powers (3 March 1853 – 24 April 1939) was an Australian politician and judge who served as Justice of the High Court of Australia from 1913 to 1929.

== Early life ==
Powers was born in 1853 in Brisbane, Colony of New South Wales. He was educated at Ipswich Grammar School and Brisbane Grammar School captaining the Schools First XI. He was a talented sportsman, and at one point captained a state cricket team against a touring English side. After completing his articles of clerkship, Powers was admitted to practise law as a solicitor in 1876, after which he moved to Bundaberg to practise. In 1878, he married Kate Ann Thorburn, whose father was a solicitor from Victoria. Powers continued to work in Bundaberg until 1882.

== Politics ==
In 1883 Powers became the mayor of Maryborough.

In June 1888, Powers was elected to the Parliament of Queensland as a member of the Legislative Assembly of Queensland for Burrum. On 19 November 1889, Powers became Postmaster-General and Minister for Education in the ministry of Premier Boyd Dunlop Morehead, and he held these positions until resigning with his colleagues in August 1890. In 1891 he was a member of a Royal Commission which was established to investigate the possibility of establishing a university in Queensland.

Powers was admitted to practice as a barrister at the Queensland bar in 1894, although since he was still in parliament at the time, he did not actually practice. From 1894 to 1895, Powers was the leader of the opposition in Queensland. During this time, he put forward an electoral reform bill which provided for women's suffrage, and the abolition of plural voting, however the bill did not succeed. If it had, Queensland would have become the second Australian colony after South Australia to allow women to vote. An industrial relations bill brought by Powers also failed.

== Legal career ==
From 1899 to 1903, Powers served as the Crown Solicitor for Queensland, and in 1903, he was appointed as the first Commonwealth Crown Solicitor. During this time, he conducted several appeals on behalf of the recently formed federal government to the Privy Council, where he argued many significant constitutional issues. He played a key role in preparing the prosecution in the Coal Vend cases, arising out of prosecutions brought by then Attorney-General of Australia Billy Hughes against a coal industry cartel. The case was successful at first instance, but was lost on appeals to the full High Court and to the Privy Council.

Nevertheless, Hughes was pleased with Powers' work, and Hughes's opinion was undoubtedly influential when the Fisher government appointed Powers to the High Court of Australia in 1913. Powers was the only solicitor to be appointed, and remains the only Justice (with the exception of the initial three) to have not argued a case before the court. He was also the first Justice appointed without a university degree. Powers was one of two justices of the Court to have previously served in the Parliament of Queensland, along with Samuel Griffith.

The appointment of Powers, along with the concurrent appointment of Albert Piddington, was highly controversial. The press considered the two appointees to be insufficiently qualified, and both were criticised for their lack of expertise and experience. There was also controversy arising from Hughes' desire to appoint judges who would be sympathetic to interpreting the power of the Parliament of Australia broadly. Piddington caused the most public outrage for stating his sympathies in a telegram, although Powers had actually prepared many of the arguments Hughes would wish him to uphold on the bench.

While Piddington ultimately resigned, Powers persevered, and remained on the High Court. Later, in 1913, he was made Deputy President of the Commonwealth Court of Conciliation and Arbitration under Justice Higgins, leaving the court on 30 April 1920. He was reappointed as Deputy President on 12 February 1921 and ultimately succeeded Higgins as President on 30 June. As President, Powers introduced the first system of automatic adjustments to the basic wage to account for changes in the cost of living, applied quarterly. He finally left the Arbitration Court on 25 June 1926.

== Later life ==
Powers was created a Knight Commander of the Order of St Michael and St George (KCMG) in 1929, and on 22 July that year resigned from the High Court. Powers died in Melbourne in 1939 and was buried in Burwood Cemetery.

Parliament of Queensland
New seat	Member for Burrum; 1888 – 1893	Succeeded by Nicholas Tooth
Preceded by Richard Hyne	Member for Maryborough; 1893 – 1896; Served alongside: John Annear	Succeeded by John Bartholomew
Legal offices
New title	Justice of the High Court of Australia; 1913–1929	Succeeded by H. V. Evatt
