= John Bartholomew (Australian politician) =

Australian politician

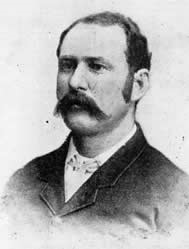

Member of the Queensland Legislative Assembly for Maryborough
- In office 21 March 1896 – 11 March 1902 Serving with John Annear
- Preceded by: Charles Powers
- Succeeded by: John Norman

Personal details
- Born: John Bartholomew; 31 October 1858 Glasgow, Scotland
- Died: 25 September 1928 (aged 69) Glen Huntly, Victoria, Australia
- Party: Ministerial
- Spouse: Christina Binnie (m.1895 )
- Occupation: Draper, Company director

John Bartholomew (31 October 1858 – 25 September 1928) was an Australian politician. He was the Ministerialist member for Maryborough in the Legislative Assembly of Queensland from 1896 to 1902.

Parliament of Queensland
Preceded by Charles Powers	Member for Maryborough; 1896–1902; Served alongside: John Annear	Succeeded by John Norman
