= John Annear (politician) =

Australian politician

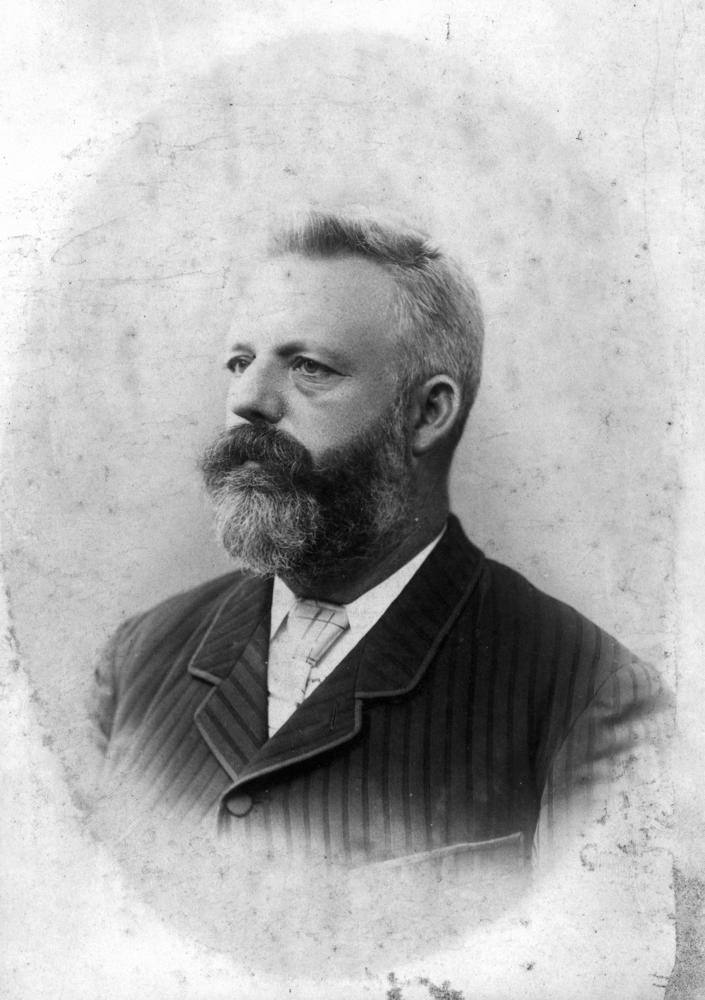

Member of the Queensland Legislative Assembly for Maryborough
- In office 25 July 1884 – 11 March 1902 Serving with Richard Sheridan, Richard Hyne, Charles Powers, John Bartholomew
- Preceded by: John Hurley
- Succeeded by: Charles Barton

Member of the Queensland Legislative Council
- In office 5 July 1902 – 25 May 1910

Personal details
- Born: John Thomas Annear; 3 June 1842 Budock, Penryn, England
- Died: 28 May 1910 (aged 67) Teneriffe, Queensland, Australia
- Resting place: Toowong Cemetery
- Party: Ministerial
- Spouse: Sarah Ann Skinnerty (m.1867 d.1911)
- Occupation: Stonemason

John Thomas Annear (3 June 1842 – 28 May 1910) was a politician in Queensland, Australia. He was a Member of the Queensland Legislative Assembly and a Member of the Queensland Legislative Council.

== Politics ==
John Annear was the member for Maryborough in the Legislative Assembly of Queensland from 1884 to 1902 and a member of the Queensland Legislative Council from 1902 until his death in 1910.

== Later life ==
John Annear died on 28 May 1910. He was buried in Toowong Cemetery.

Parliament of Queensland
Preceded by John Hurley	Member for Maryborough; 1884–1902; Served alongside: Richard Sheridan, Richard Hyne, Charles Powers, John Bartholomew	Succeeded by Charles Barton
