= Hyne & Son =

Hyne & Son Pty Ltd
- Industry: Timber manufacturing
- Founded: 1882
- Founder: Richard Matthews Hyne
- Headquarters: Maryborough, Queensland, Australia
- Parent: Lambert Investments

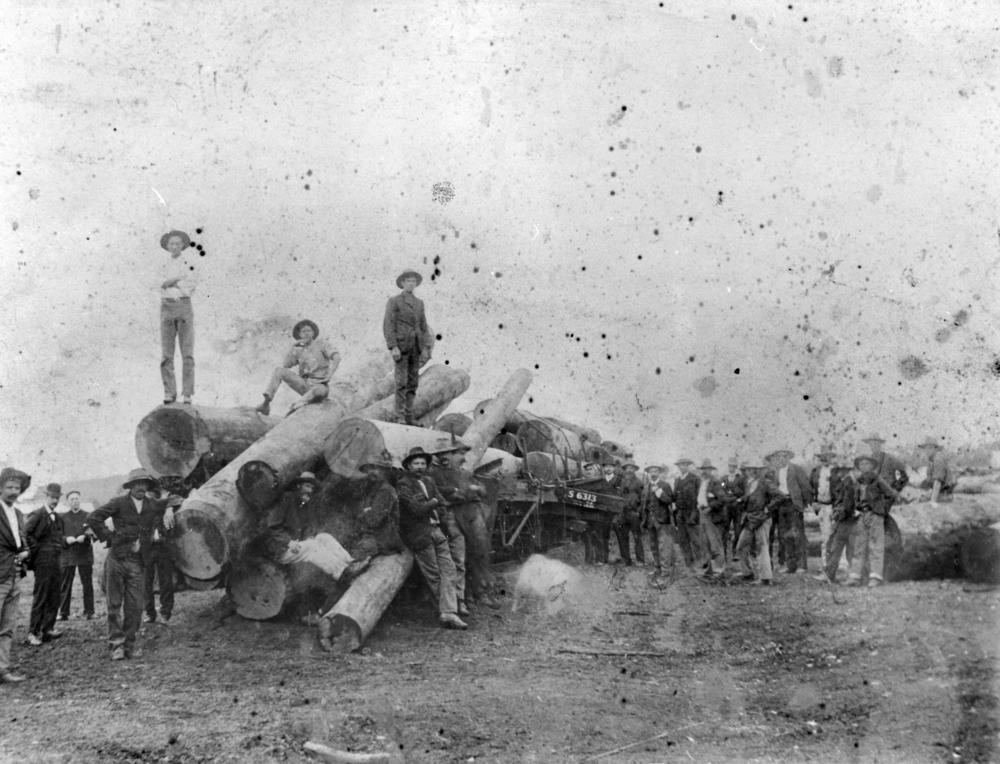
Workers at the Kingaroy sawmill, Hyne and Son, ca. 1910

Hyne & Son Pty Ltd (also known as Hyne Timber) is a major Australian timber manufacturing company. Hyne & Son is headquartered in Maryborough, Queensland and operates in New South Wales as well. The company also conducts its business across Australia and South East Asia.

Hyne & Son is a privately owned company, which includes a recent joint venture with James Jones & Sons.

== History ==
The business was established in 1882 by Richard Matthews Hyne when he established the National Sawmill on the banks of the Mary River in Queensland. The business flourished despite setbacks due to the flooding of the Mary River.

On 5 May 1888, Richard Hyne was elected to the Queensland Legislative Assembly as the member for the seat of Maryborough. He represented his district until 29 April 1893. During his time in parliament, he was responsible for initiating the replanting of forests and the creation of the Queensland Department of Forestry.

Henry James Hyne, the eldest son of Richard Matthews Hyne, entered the business in 1888 and took control of the business after his father died in 1902. Henry James Hyne was heavily involved with the licensing of sawmills and the introduction of the Timber Industry Advisory Committee.

Lambert Hyne, son of Henry Hyne, joined the company in 1921 and worked there until his retirement in 1979. He grew the business by purchasing small country hardwood mills to expand the production base and established a number of trade outlets from Brisbane to Townsville to expand the sales opportunities.

Building on his father’s legacy, Warren Hyne, managing director from 1979 to 1994, continued to innovate and expand the capacity of the business while establishing himself as a national leader of Australia’s timber industry.

Hyne Timber was inducted into the Queensland Business Leaders Hall of Fame in 2015.
