= William O'Connell (politician) =

Australian politician (1852–1903)

William Bligh Henry O'Connell (26 January 1852 – 4 March 1903) was an Australian politician. He was a member of the Queensland Legislative Assembly from 1888 to 1903, representing the electorate of Musgrave. He was Secretary of Lands in the Philp government from 1899 until his death.

O'Connell was born in Brisbane, and was educated in England, returning to Australia at the age of eighteen. He worked for a time at Baramba Station, near Kilkivan, went to work as an aide to his uncle, Administrator of the Government Maurice Charles O'Connell, and worked for the Bank of New South Wales in Bundaberg. He was then inspector of Pacific Islanders and assistant immigration agent for five years, before forming his own grocery, wine and spirit merchant firm at Bundaberg, O'Connell & Co. He was one of the first Bundaberg borough councillors in 1881.

He was elected to the Legislative Assembly at the 1888 election as a supporter of Thomas McIlwraith, and was re-elected in 1893, 1896, 1899 and 1902. He became Secretary of Lands under Robert Philp in 1899, in which he was responsible for the passage of the Land Act 1902, passed not long before his death.

He died at St Helen's Private Hospital in 1903 while still in office. The funeral was held at St John's Cathedral, for which the Supreme Court adjourned as a mark of respect. He was buried at Toowong Cemetery.
