= 1902 Queensland state election =

Legislative election in Queensland, Australia

- 11 March 1902

All 72 seats in the Legislative Assembly of Queensland 37 Assembly seats were needed for a majority
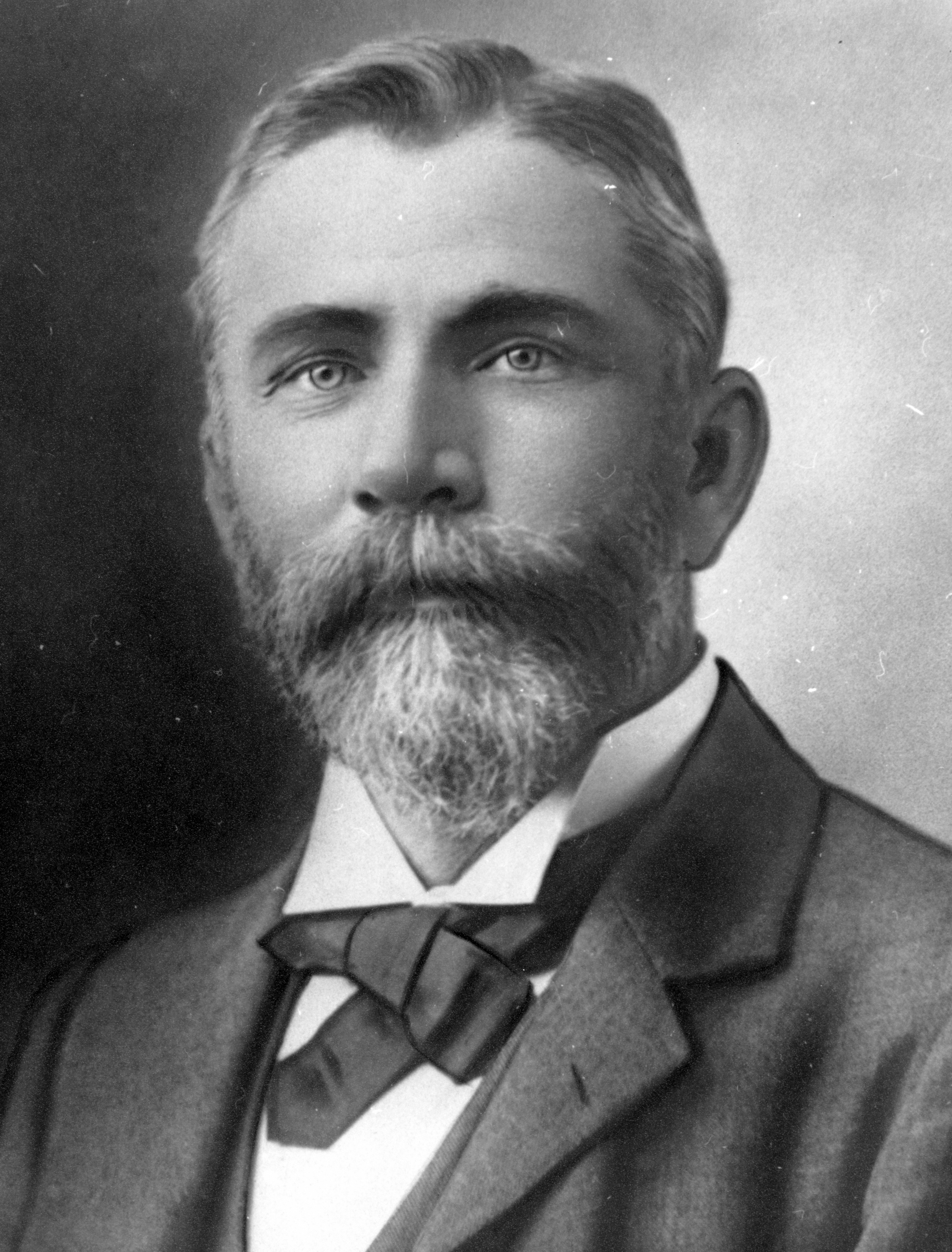

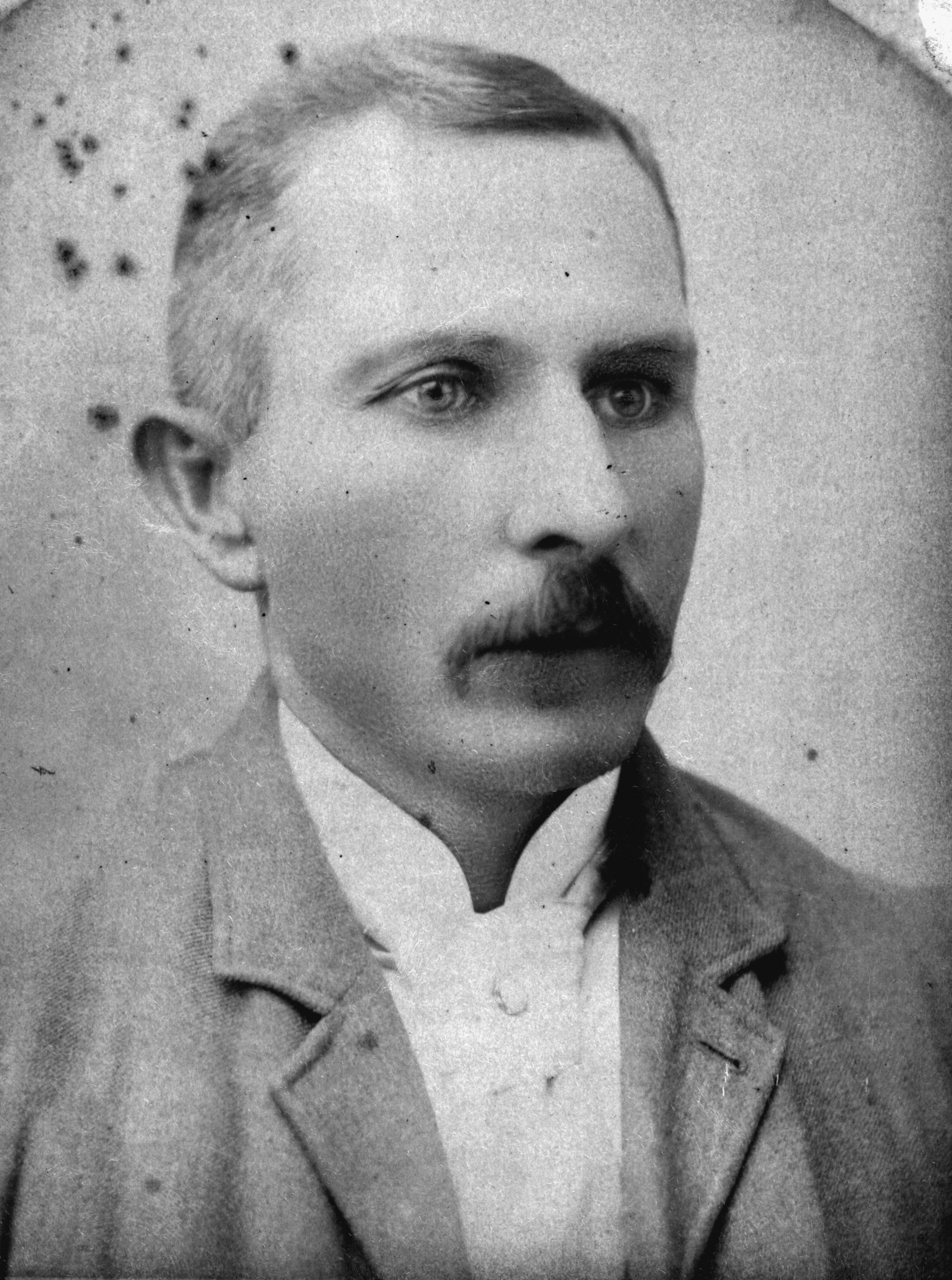
	First party	Second party
Leader	Robert Philp	W. H. Browne
Party	Ministerial	Labour
Leader's seat	Townsville	Croydon
Last election	43 seats, 49.34%	21 seats, 35.47%
Seats won	40	25
Seat change	▼3	▲4
Popular vote	48,439	39,579
Percentage	48.13%	39.33%
Swing	▼1.21pp	▲3.85pp
Premier before election
Robert Philp
Ministerial
Elected Premier
Robert Philp
Ministerial

Elections were held in the Australian state of Queensland on 11 March 1902 to elect the members of the state's Legislative Assembly.

This election used contingent voting, at least in the single-member districts.

Five districts were two-seat districts - Mackay, Marlborough, North Brisbane, Rockhampton and South Brisbane. In the two-member constituencies, plurality block voting was used -- electors could cast two valid votes but were allowed to "plump".

== Key dates ==
This was the first Queensland general election to be conducted on a single day. In the past, due to problems of distance and communications, it was not possible to hold the elections on a single day.

== Results ==
Queensland state election, 11 March 1902 Legislative Assembly << 1899–1904 >>
Enrolled voters	108,548				
Votes cast	100,644		Turnout	78.88%	
Informal votes	803		Informal		
Summary of votes by party
Party	Primary votes	%	Swing	Seats	Change
Ministerialist	48,439	48.13	-1.21	40	-3
Labour	39,579	39.33	+3.85	25	+4
Opposition	6,905	6.86	-4.22	5	-3
Farmers Rep.	1,840	1.83	+1.83	1	+1
Independent	100	0.10	+0.10	0	±0
Total	100,644			72	

== See also ==
- Members of the Queensland Legislative Assembly, 1902–1904
