= Maryborough Cemetery =

Maryborough Cemetery is a cemetery in Walker Street, Maryborough West, Maryborough, Fraser Coast Region, Queensland, Australia. The cemetery and its heritage-listed Mortuary Chapel have importance to the local community as the principal place of public burial in Maryborough for over 150 years.

== History ==
The original township of Maryborough was situated, not in its current place, but on the north of the Mary River, after wharves were established in 1847–48 providing transport for wool from sheep stations on the Burnett River. In 1850 Surveyor, Hugh Roland Labatt, arrived in Maryborough with instructions to "examine the River Mary...to suggest ...the best site or sites for the laying out of the town, having regard to the convenience of shipping on one hand and internal communication on the other...also...point out the spots desirable as reserves for public building, church, quay and for places for public recreation." The site recommended by Labatt was not where settlement was established but further east and from the early 1850s this is where the growing town developed.

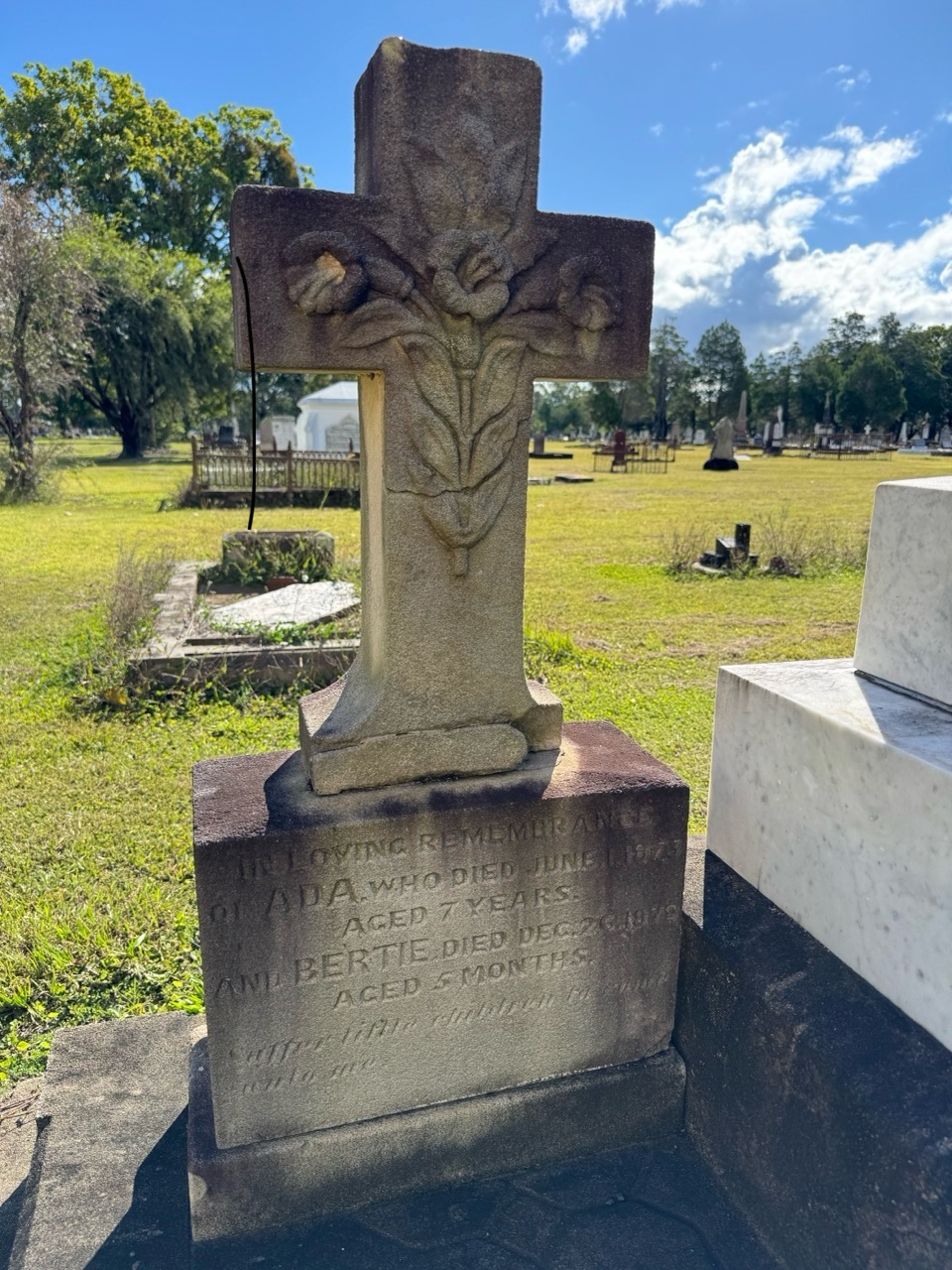
Ada Purser, a seven year old girl who died in 1873, was the first person to be buried at the Maryborough Cemetery.

The Maryborough Cemetery was established in the mid-1870s, and was the third cemetery site in the town. As Maryborough grew previous cemetery sites became inappropriately close to the centre of town. The site of the first cemetery was at the Original Maryborough Town Site and the second site was in Kent Street (now known as the Elizabeth Park Rose Gardens) and was registered in October 1871. Development surrounded this second site and by 1873 it was closed and the third cemetery site was established. Ada Purser, a seven-year-old girl who died in 1873, was the first person to be buried at the new cemetery. In the early twentieth century families were given the option of having headstones removed from the second cemetery site to this third site.

Like most nineteenth century cemeteries, the Maryborough Cemetery was designed on a grid plan with burial areas used by various religious denominations separated by lanes and walkways. At the intersection of two principal tree-lined lanes, a mortuary chapel was placed to provide shelter for family and friends of the deceased attending grave side services. This unusual building was designed by Queensland architect Willoughby Powell and constructed by Bundaberg firm Clement and Sons at a cost of £534 in 1883–84. Occasionally mortuary chapels were constructed for one denomination and placed in their section of the cemetery, but this centrally placed chapel served all denominations, the four entrances ensuring that each of the surrounding religious sections had equal access and ownership of the small chapel. The entrances are large to permit entry of a horse-drawn hearse. Its position at the intersection of the cemetery lanes and its height make it a landmark and its tower form has caused it to be locally known as "the rocket".

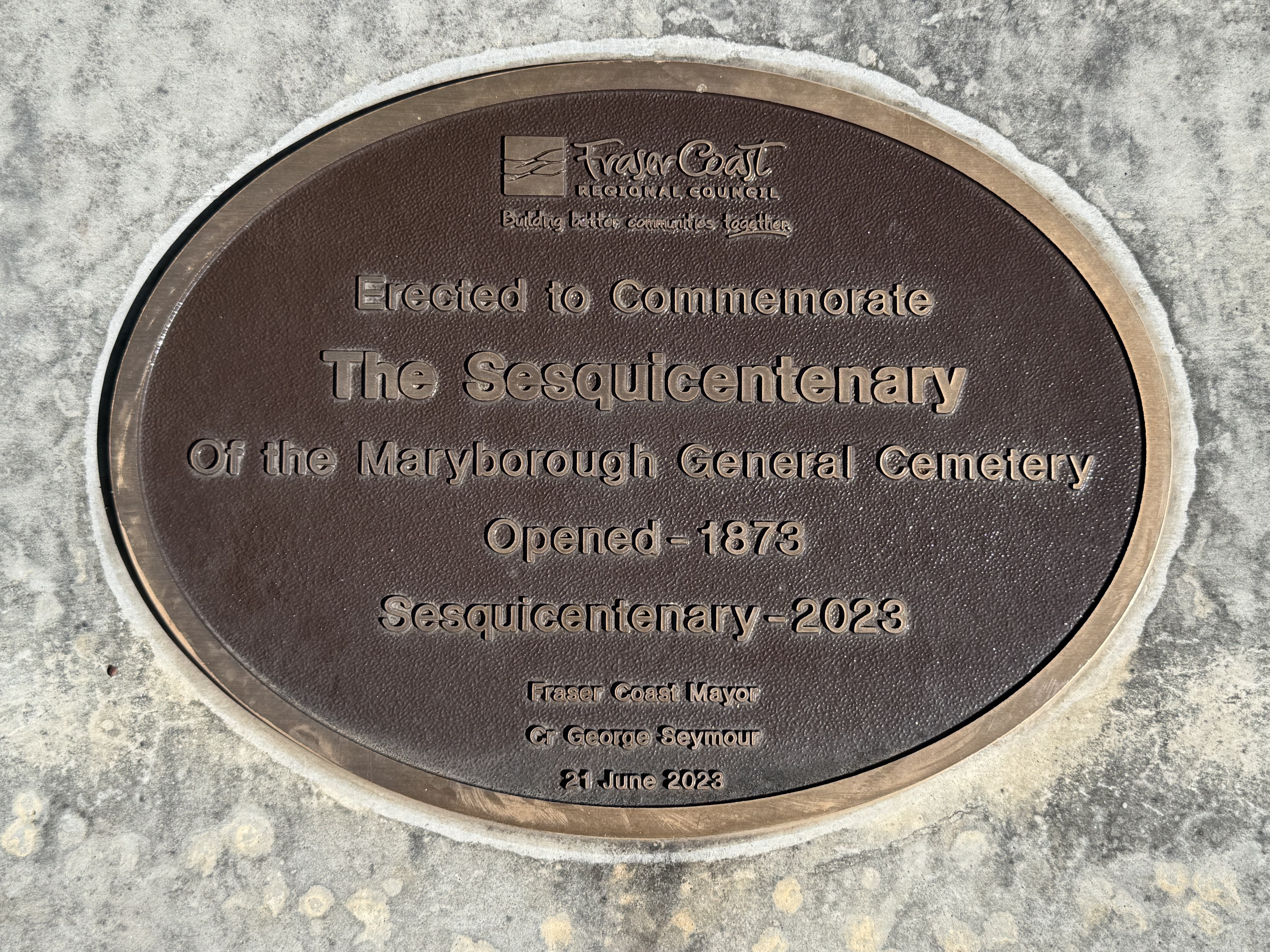
The sesquicentenary of the Maryborough Cemetery was commemorated on 21 June 2023 when Fraser Coast mayor George Seymour unveiled this plaque.

The site is important for local historical research and documentation. There are regular guided walks provided by local historical groups. The commemorations for the sesquicentenary in 2023 were led by the Mayor of the Fraser Coast Regional Council George Seymour.

=== Chapel history ===
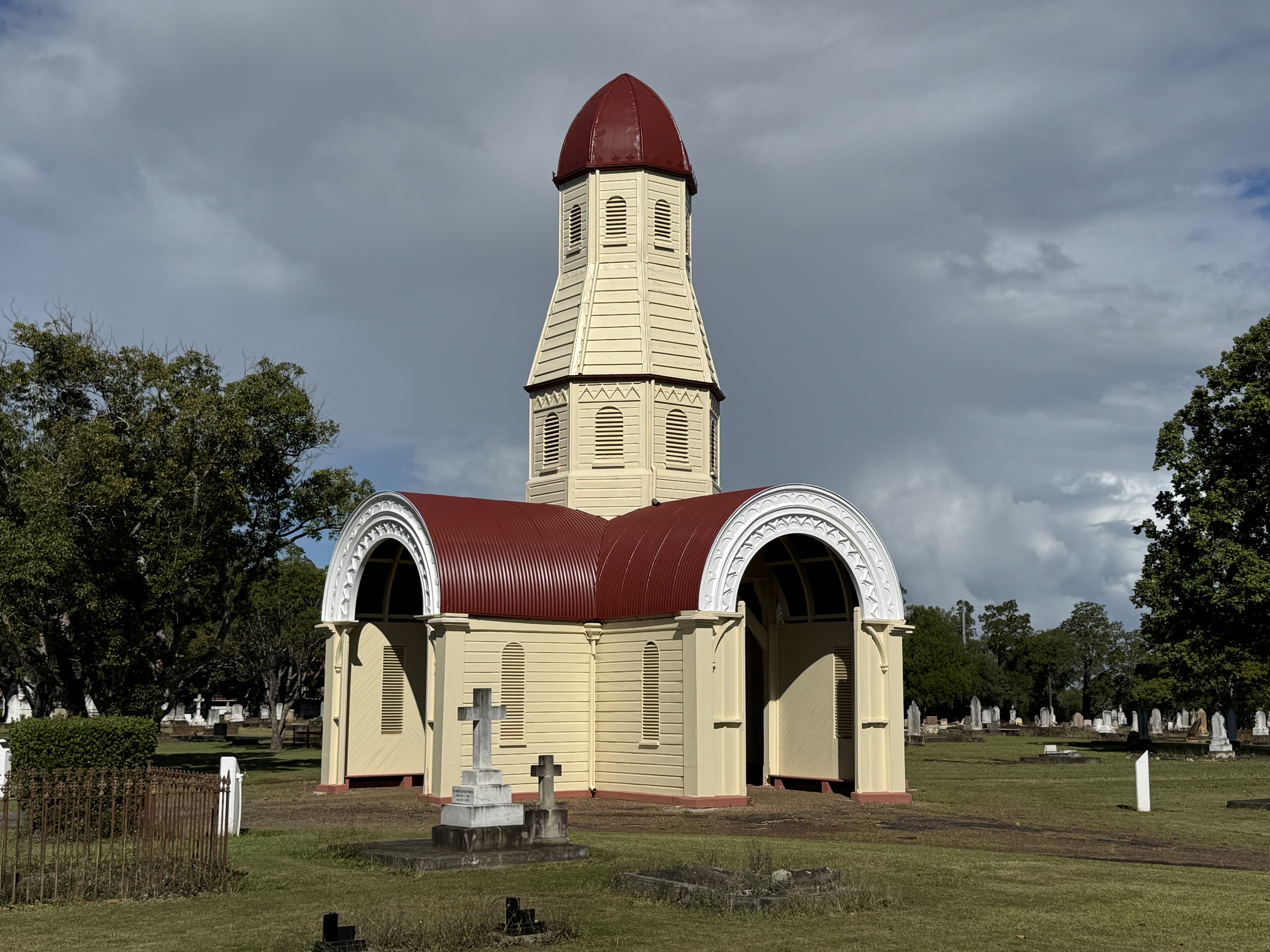
The mortuary chapel at the Maryborough Cemetery was designed by architect Willoughby Powell.

The Mortuary Chapel at the Maryborough Cemetery was constructed in 1883–84, several years after the establishment of the cemetery, to shelter mourners attending graveside services. This unusual building was designed by Queensland architect Willoughby Powell.

The architect, Willoughby Powell, was born in Cheltenham, England in about 1848 and was articled to the Cheltenham City Architect before emigrating to Queensland where he worked for Richard Gailey. He joined the Public Works Department as a draftsman in June 1874 but won a competition for the Toowoomba Grammar School and left his government position to supervise the construction works in 1875. He maintained a practice in Toowoomba until 1878 before returning to practice in Brisbane in 1879 and then to Maryborough in about 1882. During his time in Maryborough he designed many important buildings including Baddow House, the Royal Exchange Hotel, shops, the grandstand and stables at the Maryborough Turf Club, Tattersall's Hotel, Cafe Royal Hotel and a parsonage in Lennox Street. Powell again returned to practice in Brisbane and designed the Warwick Town Hall and the third Toowoomba Town Hall and was again appointed to the Works Department where he remained until 1902. Powell designed many fine buildings throughout Queensland and the Mortuary Chapel was one of the most unusual.

== Description ==
The cemetery is laid out on a simple grid plan with a series of intersecting lanes and walkways separating the denominational sections. The lanes are lined with established trees and other trees and plantings are found within the burial sections. The cemetery contains representational examples of memorials from the late nineteenth and twentieth centuries.

The mortuary chapel is a timber building that comprises two intersecting barrel vaults, producing four identical round arched entrances at the ends of the vaults. Surmounting the point of intersection of the vaults is a tall fleche, in the form of a tower and dome, which doubles the full height of the building.

=== Chapel description ===
Mortuary Chapel
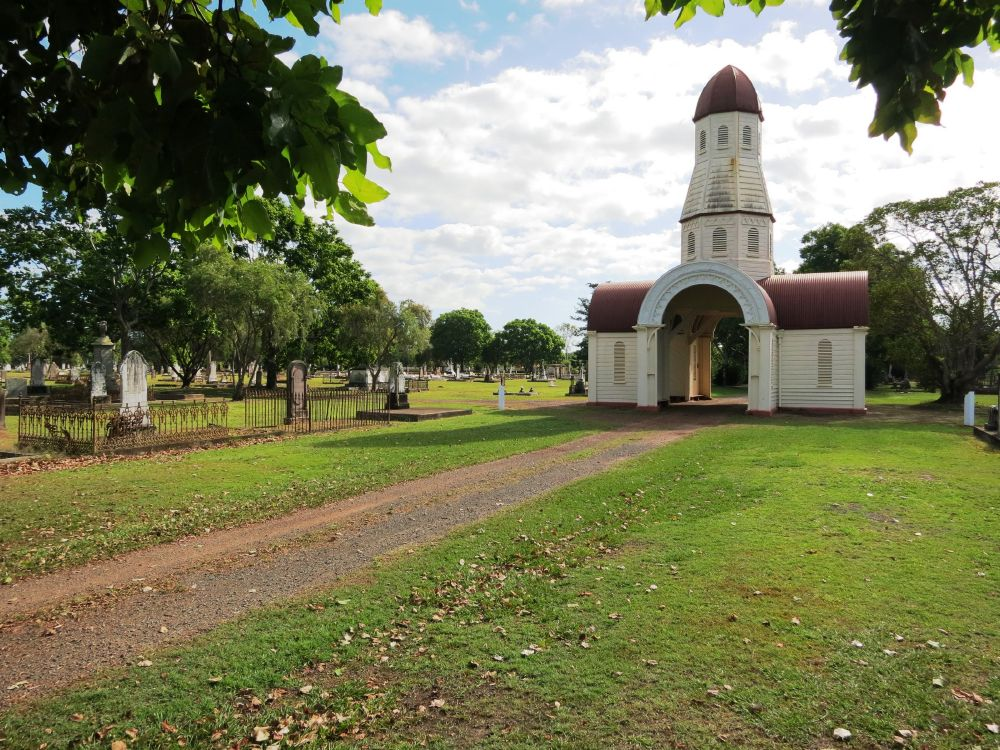
- Mortuary Chapel, 2014

- Location within Queensland Location within Australia
- 25.5159°S 152.6746°E
- Location: Walker Street, Maryborough West, Maryborough, Fraser Coast Region, Queensland, Australia

History
- Design period: 1870s–1890s (late 19th century)
- Built: 1883–1884

Site notes
- Architect: Willoughby Powell
- Architectural style: Classicism

Queensland Heritage Register
- Official name: Mortuary Chapel, Cemetery Kiosk, Cemetery Shelter
- Type: state heritage (built)
- Designated: 21 October 1992
- Reference no.: 600689
- Significant period: 1880s–1890s (historical); 1880s (fabric) ongoing (social)
- Significant components: roof/ridge ventilator/s / fleche/s, tower, shed – shelter, archway
- Builders: Clement and Sons

The Mortuary Chapel is a heritage-listed chapel at the cemetery. It was designed by Willoughby Powell and built from 1883 to 1884 by Clement and Sons. It is also known as Cemetery Kiosk and Cemetery Shelter. It was added to the Queensland Heritage Register on 21 October 1992.

The Mortuary Chapel is prominently sited within the Maryborough Cemetery at the intersection of two principal axes. The Cemetery is laid out on a simple grid plan with a series of intersecting lanes and walkways separating the denominational sections. The lanes are lined with established trees and other trees and plantings are found within the burial sections. The cemetery contains representational examples of memorials from the late nineteenth and twentieth centuries.

The timber building that comprises two intersecting barrel vaults, producing four identical round arched entrances at the ends of the vaults. Surmounting the point of intersection of the vaults is a tall fleche, in the form of a tower and dome, which doubles the full height of the building. The vaulted sections of the building are constructed with timber framed walls clad externally with horizontal chamfered timber boards and internally with diagonally laid tongue-and-groove boarding. The curved roofs of the vaults are formed with corrugated iron. The entrances, through the vaulted ends of these sections, have a wide carved timber fascia boards which rest visually on timber piers flanking the entrances. Internally the ceiling space is lined with regularly spaced timber trusses in the vaulted sections, and lined with timber boarding over the intersection.

The timber fleche is supported on heavy timber beams with brackets, found inside the chapel at the four corners of the central internal space under the fleche. The fleche has a rocket like quality, as it tapers from an octagonal base to a more narrow octagonal drum surmounted by an octagonal domed roof, clad with painted sheet metal, possibly zinc. On each face of the octagonal base and drum are round arched openings infilled with small fixed timber louvres. Other narrow round arched openings, like lancets, on the face of the buildings are also infilled with similar louvres.

== Heritage listing ==
Mortuary Chapel was listed on the Queensland Heritage Register on 21 October 1992 having satisfied the following criteria.

The place is important in demonstrating the evolution or pattern of Queensland's history.

The Mortuary Chapel at the Maryborough Cemetery by its size and quality demonstrates the growth of Maryborough in the late nineteenth century. The building provides evidence of nineteenth century burial practice, with mourners using burial sections segregated according to religious denomination able to access the building from each of its four sides.

The place demonstrates rare, uncommon or endangered aspects of Queensland's cultural heritage.

The building is a rare example of a mortuary chapel with four entrances, in an unusual building form.

The place is important because of its aesthetic significance.

The mortuary chapel forms a strong focal point within the Maryborough Cemetery, combining this landmark quality with considerable visual appeal in the cemetery landscape

The place has a strong or special association with a particular community or cultural group for social, cultural or spiritual reasons.

The cemetery and chapel have importance to the local community as the principal place of public burial in Maryborough for over 120 years.

The place has a special association with the life or work of a particular person, group or organisation of importance in Queensland's history.

It also has a strong association with the life and work of Queensland architect, Willoughby Powell.

== Notable burials ==
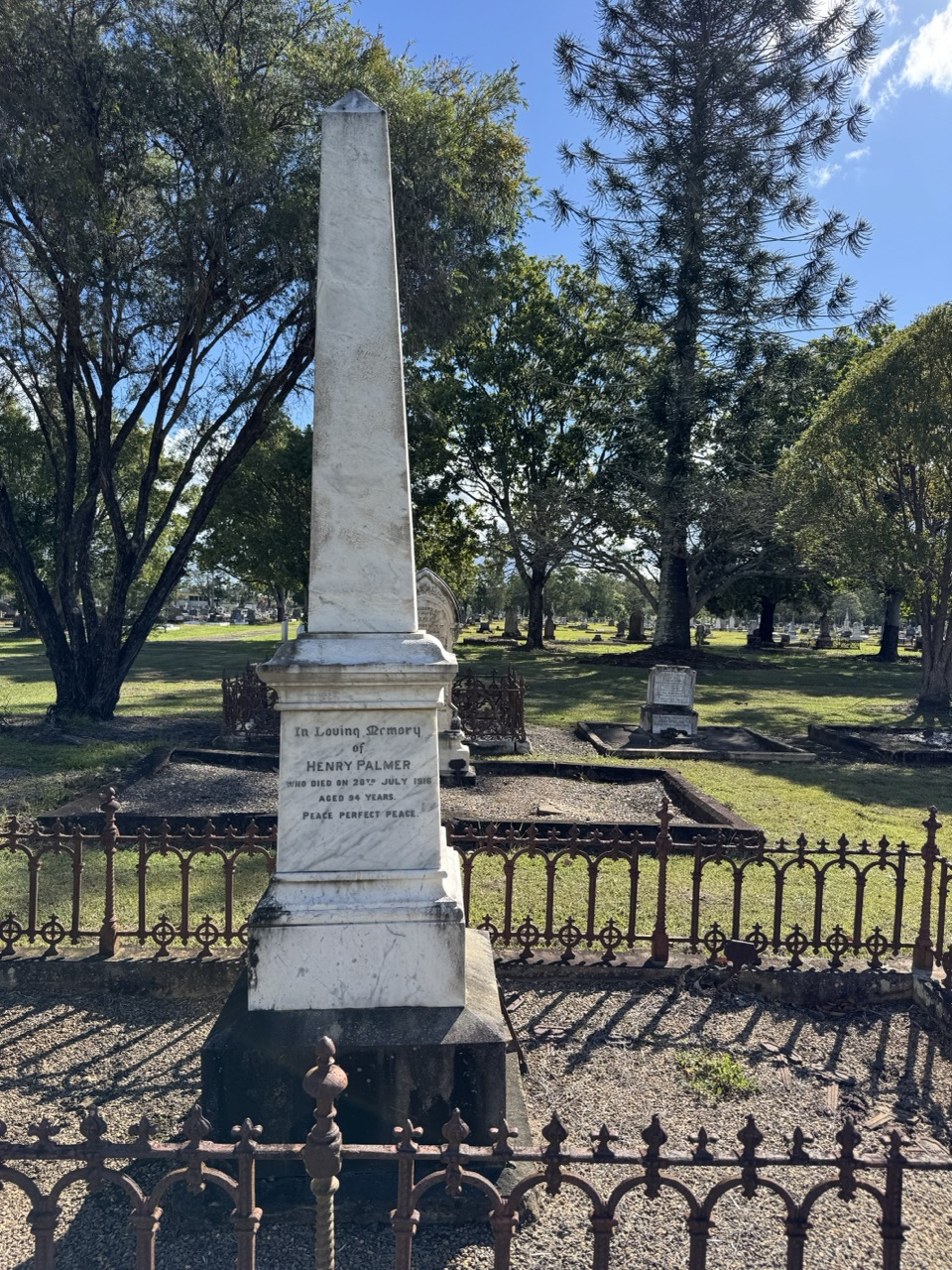
The gravesite of Henry Palmer, the first mayor of Maryborough and Member of Parliament, at the Maryborough Cemetery.

Notable people interred in Maryborough Cemetery include:

- Edward Corser, politician
- William Demaine, newspaper editor and politician
- Andrew Dunn, newspaper proprietor and politician
- Brendan Hansen, shipwright and politician
- Richard Hyne, politician and founder of Hyne & Son
- Charles McGhie, shipwright, newspaper proprietor and politician
- Henry Palmer, politician
- David Weir, clerk and politician
- Andrew Wilson, sawmiller and politician
