= Richard Hyne =

Australian politician (1839–1902)

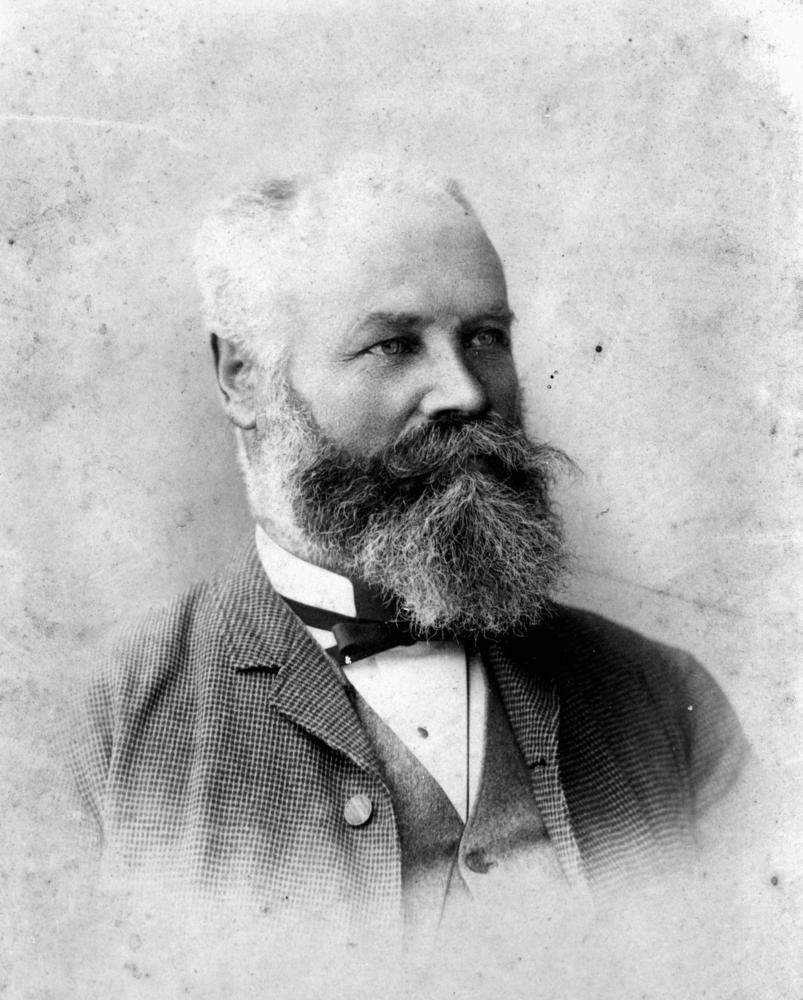

Member of the Queensland Legislative Assembly for Maryborough
- In office 5 May 1888 – 29 April 1893 Serving with John Annear
- Preceded by: Richard Sheridan
- Succeeded by: Charles Powers

Personal details
- Born: Richard Mathews Hyne; 4 July 1839 Devonshire, England
- Died: 5 July 1902 (aged 63) Maryborough, Queensland, Australia
- Resting place: Maryborough Cemetery
- Spouse: Elizabeth Lambert (d.1879)
- Occupation: Businessman

Richard Mathews Hyne (4 July 1839-5 July 1902) was a politician in Queensland, Australia. He was a Member of the Queensland Legislative Assembly.

He was the founder of the Hyne & Son timber milling company. In 1879 he was appointed one of the founding trustees of Maryborough Boys Grammar School.

Parliament of Queensland
Preceded by Richard Sheridan	Member for Cook; 1888–1893; Served alongside: John Annear	Succeeded by Charles Powers
