= Electoral results for the district of Currumbin =

Queensland, Australia, district election results

This is a list of electoral results for the electoral district of Currumbin in Queensland state elections.

== Members for Currumbin ==
Member	Party	Term
Leo Gately	National	1986–1989
Trevor Coomber	Liberal	1989–1992
Merri Rose	Labor	1992–2004
Jann Stuckey	Liberal	2004–2008
Jann Stuckey	Liberal National	2008–2020
Laura Gerber	Liberal National	2020–present

== Election results ==
=== Elections in the 2020s ===
2024 Queensland state election: Currumbin
Party	Candidate	Votes	%	±%
Liberal National	Laura Gerber	14,328	47.86	+7.62
Labor	Nathan Fleury	7,164	23.93	−10.79
Independent	Kathleen Therese Down	2,939	9.82	+9.82
Greens	Braden Smith	2,854	9.53	−0.34
One Nation	Angela Gunson	1,598	5.34	+1.33
Animal Justice	Jennifer Horsburgh	696	2.32	+2.32
Family First	David Totenhofer	359	1.20	+1.20
Total formal votes		29,938	94.03	−1.31
Informal votes		1,902	5.97	+1.31
Turnout		31,840	84.38	−2.06
Two-party-preferred result
Liberal National	Laura Gerber	18,657	62.32	+11.80
Labor	Nathan Fleury	11,281	37.68	−11.80
Liberal National hold		Swing	+11.80	

2020 Queensland state election: Currumbin
Party	Candidate	Votes	%	±%
Liberal National	Laura Gerber	11,957	40.24	−7.45
Labor	Kaylee Campradt	10,317	34.72	−0.91
Greens	Peter Burgoyne	2,933	9.87	−1.85
Independent	Richard Stuckey	1,681	5.66	+5.66
One Nation	Glen Wadsworth	1,193	4.01	+4.01
Independent	Tracy Takacs-Thorne	1,048	3.53	+3.53
United Australia	Anna Palmer	460	1.55	+1.55
Independent	Ian Logan	127	0.43	+0.43
Total formal votes		29,716	95.34	−0.01
Informal votes		1,454	4.66	+0.01
Turnout		31,170	86.44	+1.97
Two-party-preferred result
Liberal National	Laura Gerber	15,013	50.52	−2.79
Labor	Kaylee Campradt	14,703	49.48	+2.79
Liberal National hold		Swing	−2.79	

=== Elections in the 2010s ===
2020 Currumbin state by-election
Party	Candidate	Votes	%	±%
Liberal National	Laura Gerber	10,071	43.8	−3.9
Labor	Kaylee Campradt	8,790	38.2	+2.6
Greens	Sally Spain	2,530	11.0	−0.7
One Nation	Nicholas Bettany	1,594	6.9	+6.9
Total formal votes		22,985	91.9	−3.4
Informal votes		2,023	8.1	+3.4
Turnout		25,008	71.5	−14.6
Two-party-preferred result
Liberal National	Laura Gerber	11,776	51.2	−2.1
Labor	Kaylee Campradt	11,209	48.8	+2.1
Liberal National hold		Swing	−2.1	

2017 Queensland state election: Currumbin
Party	Candidate	Votes	%	±%
Liberal National	Jann Stuckey	13,215	47.7	+1.8
Labor	Georgi Leader	9,874	35.6	+5.9
Greens	David Wyatt	3,249	11.7	+0.4
Independent	Andrew Semple	1,375	5.0	+5.0
Total formal votes		27,713	95.3	−2.3
Informal votes		1,352	4.7	+2.3
Turnout		29,065	84.5	+1.6
Two-party-preferred result
Liberal National	Jann Stuckey	14,775	53.3	−2.4
Labor	Georgi Leader	12,938	46.7	+2.4
Liberal National hold		Swing	−2.4	

2015 Queensland state election: Currumbin
Party	Candidate	Votes	%	±%
Liberal National	Jann Stuckey	13,389	45.39	−13.45
Labor	Ashley Wain	8,804	29.84	+7.92
Greens	David Wyatt	3,442	11.67	+2.16
Palmer United	Kristian Rees	2,046	6.94	+6.94
One Nation	Deborah Gravenall	1,073	3.64	+3.64
Family First	Ben Donovan	746	2.53	−0.04
Total formal votes		29,500	97.59	−0.02
Informal votes		727	2.41	+0.02
Turnout		30,227	87.49	−1.43
Two-party-preferred result
Liberal National	Jann Stuckey	14,475	55.23	−14.96
Labor	Ashley Wain	11,734	44.77	+14.96
Liberal National hold		Swing	−14.96	

2012 Queensland state election: Currumbin
Party	Candidate	Votes	%	±%
Liberal National	Jann Stuckey	16,237	58.84	+7.77
Labor	Calum Hyslop	6,051	21.93	−14.65
Greens	David Wyatt	2,624	9.51	+0.31
Katter's Australian	Steve Bowman	1,973	7.15	+7.15
Family First	Royston Pickering	710	2.57	+2.57
Total formal votes		27,595	97.61	−0.56
Informal votes		675	2.39	+0.56
Turnout		28,270	88.92	−0.03
Two-party-preferred result
Liberal National	Jann Stuckey	17,245	70.19	+13.30
Labor	Calum Hyslop	7,325	29.81	−13.30
Liberal National hold		Swing	+13.30	

=== Elections in the 2000s ===
2009 Queensland state election: Currumbin
Party	Candidate	Votes	%	±%
Liberal National	Jann Stuckey	13,790	51.1	+3.2
Labor	Michael Riordan	9,876	36.6	−6.1
Greens	Inge Light	2,484	9.2	−0.2
DS4SEQ	Jason Hockings	850	3.1	+3.1
Total formal votes		27,000	98.1	
Informal votes		504	1.9	
Turnout		27,504	89.0	
Two-party-preferred result
Liberal National	Jann Stuckey	14,551	56.9	+4.7
Labor	Michael Riordan	11,025	43.1	−4.7
Liberal National hold		Swing	+4.7	

2006 Queensland state election: Currumbin
Party	Candidate	Votes	%	±%
Liberal	Jann Stuckey	12,480	47.9	+1.9
Labor	Michael Riordan	11,139	42.7	+3.1
Greens	Inge Light	2,461	9.4	+0.4
Total formal votes		26,080	98.0	−0.0
Informal votes		531	2.0	+0.0
Turnout		26,611	88.6	−1.8
Two-party-preferred result
Liberal	Jann Stuckey	13,058	52.2	−1.0
Labor	Michael Riordan	11,949	47.8	+1.0
Liberal hold		Swing	−1.0	

2004 Queensland state election: Currumbin
Party	Candidate	Votes	%	±%
Liberal	Jann Stuckey	12,085	46.0	+20.4
Labor	Merri Rose	10,423	39.6	−16.8
Greens	Anja Light	2,356	9.0	+9.0
One Nation	Carol Minter	1,428	5.4	−10.2
Total formal votes		26,292	98.0	−0.3
Informal votes		526	2.0	+0.3
Turnout		26,818	90.4	−0.8
Two-party-preferred result
Liberal	Jann Stuckey	12,932	53.2	+17.7
Labor	Merri Rose	11,362	46.8	−17.7
Liberal gain from Labor		Swing	+17.7	

2001 Queensland state election: Currumbin
Party	Candidate	Votes	%	±%
Labor	Merri Rose	13,801	56.4	+15.8
Liberal	Jann Stuckey	6,251	25.6	+11.3
One Nation	Maurice Horsburgh	3,823	15.6	−4.9
Independent	Helen Rossini	590	2.4	+2.4
Total formal votes		24,465	98.3	
Informal votes		421	1.7	
Turnout		24,886	91.2	
Two-party-preferred result
Labor	Merri Rose	14,581	64.5	+11.7
Liberal	Jann Stuckey	8,009	35.5	+35.5
Labor hold		Swing	+11.7	

=== Elections in the 1990s ===
1998 Queensland state election: Currumbin
Party	Candidate	Votes	%	±%
Labor	Merri Rose	8,982	40.6	−5.7
One Nation	Paul Boyle	4,537	20.5	+20.5
National	Sue Robbins	4,475	20.2	+20.2
Liberal	Warrick Coleborne	3,155	14.3	−30.9
Greens	John Palmer	898	4.1	−3.4
Independent	Mick Gay	56	0.3	+0.3
Total formal votes		22,103	98.6	+0.0
Informal votes		308	1.4	−0.0
Turnout		22,411	91.9	+1.6
Two-party-preferred result
Labor	Merri Rose	10,683	52.8	+1.2
National	Sue Robbins	9,558	47.2	+47.2
Labor hold		Swing	+1.2	

1995 Queensland state election: Currumbin
Party	Candidate	Votes	%	±%
Labor	Merri Rose	9,425	46.4	−1.2
Liberal	Kerrin Woods	9,181	45.2	+21.4
Greens	Anja Light	1,523	7.5	−2.3
Independent	Kevin Goodwin	196	1.0	+1.0
Total formal votes		20,325	98.7	+0.5
Informal votes		277	1.3	−0.5
Turnout		20,602	90.3	
Two-party-preferred result
Labor	Merri Rose	10,208	51.5	−4.3
Liberal	Kerrin Woods	9,602	48.5	+4.3
Labor hold		Swing	−4.3	

1992 Queensland state election: Currumbin
Party	Candidate	Votes	%	±%
Labor	Merri Rose	8,934	47.6	+2.4
Liberal	Andrew Schuller	4,462	23.8	−5.6
National	Bob Hancock	3,523	18.8	−1.7
Greens	Brad Farmer	1,845	9.8	+9.8
Total formal votes		18,764	98.2	
Informal votes		347	1.8	
Turnout		19,111	88.9	
Two-party-preferred result
Labor	Merri Rose	9,961	55.8	+5.9
Liberal	Andrew Schuller	7,888	44.2	−5.9
Labor gain from Liberal		Swing	+5.9	

=== Elections in the 1980s ===
1989 Queensland state election: Currumbin
Party	Candidate	Votes	%	±%
Labor	Michael Batkin	9,955	44.5	+10.9
Liberal	Trevor Coomber	6,767	30.3	+16.4
National	Leo Gately	4,553	20.4	−19.4
Democrats	John Moreland	1,078	4.8	+2.9
Total formal votes		22,353	97.4	−0.4
Informal votes		593	2.6	+0.4
Turnout		22,946	87.7	−1.2
Two-party-preferred result
Liberal	Trevor Coomber	11,381	50.9	+50.9
Labor	Michael Batkin	10,972	49.1	+8.0
Liberal gain from National		Swing	+50.9	

1986 Queensland state election: Currumbin
Party	Candidate	Votes	%	±%
National	Leo Gately	6,930	39.8	
Labor	Noel Elliot	5,854	33.6	
Liberal	Robert Freebairn	2,413	13.9	
Independent	Trevor Coomber	1,882	10.8	
Democrats	Yvonne Stoelhorst	338	1.9	
Total formal votes		17,417	97.8	
Informal votes		391	2.2	
Turnout		17,808	88.9	
Two-party-preferred result
National	Leo Gately	10,255	58.9	
Labor	Noel Elliot	7,162	41.1	
National win		(new seat)		
