= Premiership of David Crisafulli =

Period of government in the Australian state of Queensland since 2024

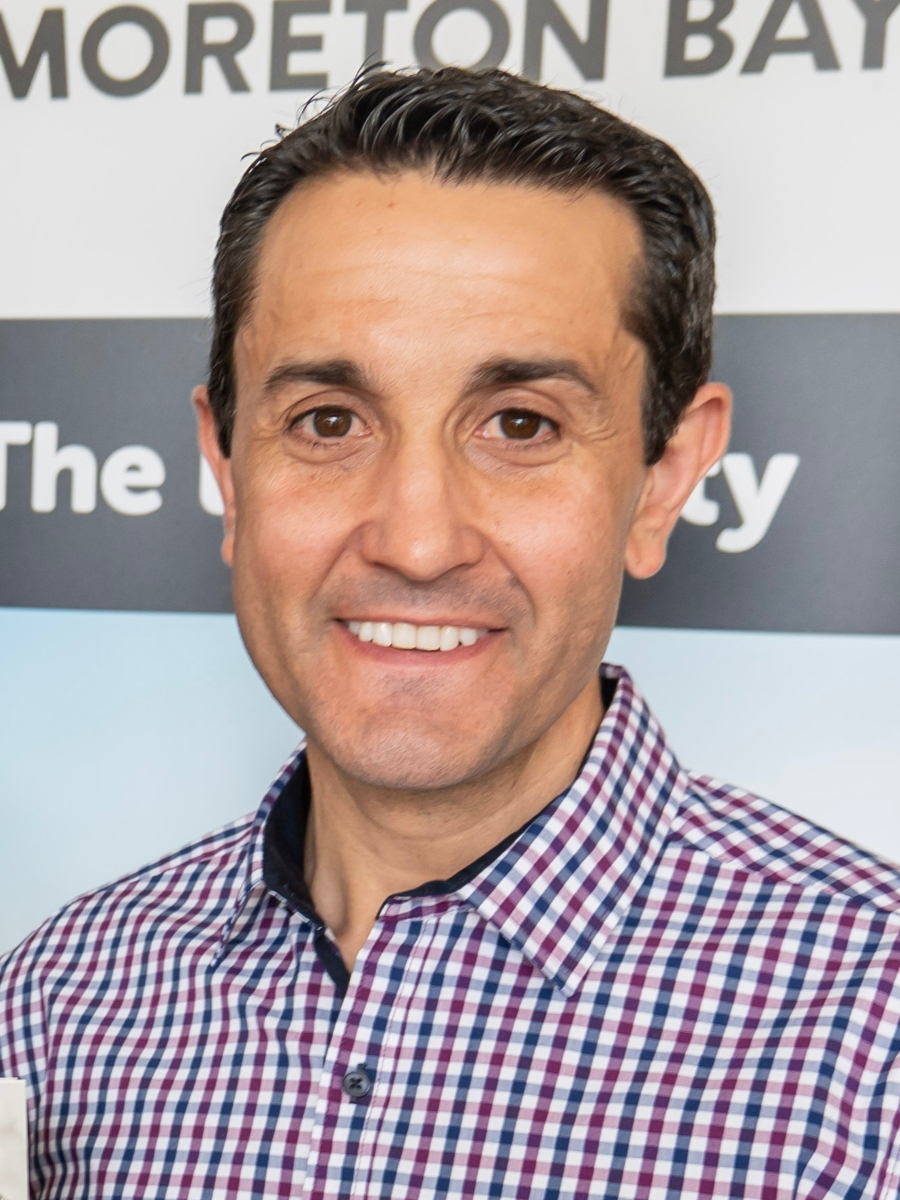
- David Crisafulli in 2022.
- Premiership of David Crisafulli; 28 October 2024 – present (2 years, 19 days)
- Premier: David Crisafulli
- Governor: Jeannette Young
- Cabinet: Crisafulli I Crisafulli II
- Party: Liberal National; Majority in legislature
- Election: 2024
- Appointed by: Governor Jeannette Young
- Seat: 1 William Street, Brisbane
- Coat of Arms of Queensland

The premiership of David Crisafulli began on 28 October 2024 when he was sworn in as Premier of Queensland following his Liberal National party winning the 2024 Queensland state election. Like in the Northern Territory just weeks prior, the Coalition affiliate in the state of Queensland — the LNP, won a reasonably large majority in parliament. The premiership of David Crisafulli is but one of three Liberal-National coalition-run governments in Australia, up from just Tasmania before August 2024. The election of Crisafulli's government was the first time the LNP had won government in Queensland since the extensive landslide in the 2012 Queensland state election.

During Crisafulli's election campaign, he prioritised four main issues — namely crime, health, cost of living and housing. Early in his premiership, he took executive action to permanently cancel the Pioneer Burdekin hydro plant development, with an aim to reduce the government expenditure, as well as find alternative clean-energy solutions. Crisafulli has opted to halt development of new stadia for the 2032 Brisbane Summer Olympics, in favour of upgrading other stadiums at a cheaper cost. In the role of premier, Crisafulli has reappointed various government department directors-general and commissioners, including former Labor politician and director-general for Premier and Cabinet, Mike Kaiser. In other appointments during his current term, Crisafulli will likely appoint at least 4 new justices of the Queensland Supreme Court, due to a number reaching the mandatory retirement age. Crisafulli will also nominate a successor of the current Governor of Queensland to the King of Australia for consideration later in his term due to the current governor's term ending by convention in 2026. Crisafulli's legislative agenda has so far been crime-based, with his controversial Making Queensland Safer Laws passing the parliament on 12 December 2024. The aforementioned laws have been criticised by numerous organisations, including Amnesty International, due to an alleged violation of humanitarianism. In the legislative realm, Crisafulli has also taken executive action to halt the parliamentary and independent inquiries into truth-telling and treaty following the results of the 2023 Indigenous Voice Referendum, as well as the inquiry into youth crime. Crisafulli has described himself as a centrist, and aligns with the moderate faction of the Liberal National Party of Queensland.

== Electoral history ==
=== 2024 Queensland state election ===
The 2024 Queensland state election was held on 26 October 2024. Polls prior to the election held that the chance of a Liberal-National party landslide was a probability. It is widely believed that Crisafulli's ambiguity on the issue of abortion caused polls to narrow before the election. Regardless of the poll narrowing, Crisafulli led the LNP to victory in the election, securing 52 of the 93 seats in the unicameral Parliament of Queensland. The Liberal-National party's win in the 2024 election secured the first LNP government since Campbell Newman won in a greatly-extensive landslide after the 2012 Queensland state election.

In Australia's eight self-governing states and territories, only 3 are currently under the control of a Liberal-National coalition affiliate government. Between the 2023 New South Wales state election and the electoral landslide victory of Coalition affiliate the Country Liberal Party in the Northern Territory in August 2024, Tasmania was the country's only Coalition government — albeit in a fracturing minority supported by independents.

2024 Queensland state election results by electorate

==== Campaign ====
Prior to the 2024 election, the LNP ran a 4-pronged campaign which was styled as the "Right Plan for Queensland".

Crisafulli campaigned on youth crime as a major part of his election bid. He pledged $40 million towards 4 'early intervention schools' to target youth at risk of committing crime. He also committed $50 million towards the opening of 'reset camps' for young people likely to commit crime, which was criticised by his Labor colleagues as 'power overreach' and 'abusive'.

The Crisafulli led LNP pledged $590 million towards an Easier Access to Health Services Plan which was highlighted by the following promises:

- Provide publicly available real-time hospital data, aimed at easing pressure on staff at over-triaged times, within first 100 days;
- Reduce ambulance ramping by 30% in the first 4 years;
- Hire 34,200 extra healthcare workers by 2032; and
- Aim to fast track elective surgical operations.

The LNP unveiled their Saving you Paying Plan during the election, which was alleged would ease cost of living pressures. This plan included building more regional roads, increasing housing supply, and providing 'water security' to food producers. The LNP also vowed to stop the Pioneer Burdekin pumped-hydro plant which is said to cost around $24 billion AUD. Crisafulli alleges that this plant would increase electricity cost throughout Queensland, and instead aims to build smaller hydro and renewable energy projects at a lower cost.

The LNP announced their Securing our Housing Foundations Plan during the election campaign. Crisafulli and his LNP pledged to:

- Begin new housing developments by creating a $2 billion Housing Infrastructure Investment Fund;
- Work on a lower level with local councils to ensure sewer and water connections to new developments;
- Collaborate with local councils to streamline housing development approvals;
- Remove stamp duty on new houses; and
- Enact a shared-equity purchasing scheme for housing.

==== Swearing-in ====
David Crisafulli was on 28 October 2024 sworn in as the 41st Premier of Queensland. His deputy, Jarrod Bleijie, was also sworn in, with the both of them sharing a lengthy interim ministerial portfolio.

On 1 November 2024, the totality of Crisafulli's 20-minister cabinet was sworn in by Governor Young of Queensland.

== State and domestic affairs ==
=== Economy ===
==== Mining ====
In November 2024, it was revealed that Crisafulli has been in consultations with people interested in buying natural-resource mines in Mount Isa. Crisafulli criticised Glencore, the current owners intending on closing the mines, for not mining at the locations and therefore placing the employee's futures in jeopardy as well as the mining town itself. Later in November, Crisafulli confirmed that Queensland's mining tax will continue, but promises that the system will be "fairer".

==== Housing ====
Within Crisafulli's first week in the premiership, he instructed the Department of the Treasury to abolish stamp duty on new builds for first home buyers.

=== Healthcare ===
On 6 November 2024, Crisafulli committed to upgrading the Rockhampton Hospital's outdated emergency department to prevent it "bursting at the seams".

On 10 December 2024, Crisafulli's government moved a motion in the parliament to block any changes to the Termination of Pregnancy Act that would restrict abortion, including the bill moved by Katter's Australian Party that would mandate that care be provided for babies born alive after an unsuccessful abortion.

=== Adolescent social media ban ===
Crisafulli announced in November 2024 that he would support Federal Labor's ban on under-16s using social media platforms.

=== Brisbane 2032 ===
It was confirmed on 21 July 2021 that Brisbane was to be the host of the 2032 Summer Olympics. Since this announcement, there has been considerable arguments over monetary allocations and stadium locations from both sides of politics. Crisafulli's predecessor, Miles, vaguely accepted International Olympic Committee recommendations in 2024 to scrap plans to upgrade a stadium in The Gabba in favour of building a new $3.4b stadium in Victoria Park, Brisbane. Crisafulli has slammed both plans and intends to consult with federal sports minister Anika Wells to work on an outcome, although Crisafulli has vowed to not construct a new stadium. In March 2025, Crisafulli announced that a new stadium at Victoria Park would be built for the 2032 Summer Olympics, despite previously stating that a new stadium would not be built in the lead up to the 2024 election.

=== Indigenous affairs ===
Early in his term as premier, Crisafulli ordered that the Path to Treaty Act and parliamentary inquiries into the Act be repealed, based on the results of the 2023 Indigenous referendum.

In December 2024, Crisafulli confirmed that the Queensland Government would continue to fight the Native title claim initiated by the Woppaburra people in attempt to control Great Keppel Island. Native title was previously granted to the Woppaburra people for 570 km^{2} of the island excluding the abandoned resort, along with 13 other islands in the archipelago. The indigenous group claims that it is not anti-development and insists that they want native title purely to safeguard the 'natural beauty' of the island. The Queensland Government has said that they are against providing native title to the indigenous for the island, hinting that it would damage the government's aspirations to restart tourism to the archipelago.

=== LGBT ===
In January 2025, shortly after assuming office, Minister for Health Tim Nicholls announced an immediate pause on the prescription of puberty blockers (Stage 1 treatment) and cross-sex hormones (Stage 2 treatment) for new patients under 18 with gender dysphoria in Queensland's public health services, pending an additional independent review of evidence and best practices. The policy is the first such ban in an Australian state.

On 27 October 2025, the Queensland Supreme Court ruled the directive unlawful.

Hours later, on 28 October 2025, Nicholls exercised his ministerial discretion under section 44 of the Act to issue a new directive reinstating the restrictions in substantially the same terms, applying immediately to all public Hospital and Health Services. It mandates multidisciplinary panel approval for any exceptions and prioritises psychological interventions, pending the review's completion (expected November 2025) and a further evidence assessment by January 2026. Nicholls justified the action as necessary "in the public interest" to protect children amid ongoing debates over treatment efficacy.

=== Free speech ===
In February 2026, Queensland proposed to ban the slogans "from the river to the sea" and "Globalize the intifada". If the legislation is passed, anyone found using or displaying either slogan face penalties of up to two years in jail. The Queensland legislation passed into law on 5 March 2026. The LNP and the KAP voted for it, while Labor and the Greens voted against it. Becoming the first state in Australia to outlaw the slogans.

=== Environment ===
In 2025, the state government added 8,700 hectares to Queensland's national park and nature refuge system, including 6,000 hectares within the Wet Tropics World Heritage Area. Five former forest reserves have been upgraded, and eighteen new nature refuges established.

== Appointments ==
=== Cabinet ===
On 1 November 2024, the full ministry was formally sworn in, as follows:

Portrait	Minister	Portfolio	Took office	Left office	Duration of tenure	Party	Electorate
Cabinet Ministers
	David Crisafulli	Premier; Minister for Veterans	28 October 2024	Incumbent	2 years, 19 days	Liberal National	Broadwater
	Jarrod Bleijie	Deputy Premier; Minister for State Development and Infrastructure; Minister for Industrial Relations	28 October 2024	Incumbent	2 years, 19 days	Liberal National	Kawana
	David Janetzki	Treasurer; Minister for Energy; Minister for Homes	1 November 2024	Incumbent	2 years, 15 days	Liberal National	Toowoomba South
	Ros Bates	Minister for Finance and Trade; Minister for Employment and Training	1 November 2024	Incumbent	2 years, 15 days	Liberal National	Mudgeeraba
	Tim Nicholls	Minister for Health and Ambulance Services	1 November 2024	Incumbent	2 years, 15 days	Liberal National	Clayfield
	Deb Frecklington	Attorney-General; Minister for Justice; Minister for Integrity	1 November 2024	Incumbent	2 years, 15 days	Liberal National	Nanango
	Dale Last	Minister for Natural Resources and Mines; Minister for Manufacturing; Minister for Rural and Regional Development	1 November 2024	Incumbent	2 years, 15 days	Liberal National	Burdekin
	John-Paul Langbroek	Minister for Education; Minister for the Arts	1 November 2024	Incumbent	2 years, 15 days	Liberal National	Surfers Paradise
	Dan Purdie	Minister for Police and Community Safety	1 November 2024	Incumbent	2 years, 15 days	Liberal National	Ninderry
	Laura Gerber	Minister for Youth Justice and Victim Support; Minister for Corrective Services	1 November 2024	Incumbent	2 years, 15 days	Liberal National	Currumbin
	Brent Mickelberg	Minister for Transport and Main Roads	1 November 2024	Incumbent	2 years, 15 days	Liberal National	Buderim
	Ann Leahy	Minister for Local Government; Minister for Water; Minister for Fire and Emergency Services; Minister for Disaster Recovery; Minister for Volunteers	1 November 2024	Incumbent	2 years, 15 days	Liberal National	Warrego
	Sam O'Connor	Minister for Housing and Public Works; Minister for Youth	1 November 2024	Incumbent	2 years, 15 days	Liberal National	Bonney
	Tony Perrett	Minister for Primary Industries	1 November 2024	Incumbent	2 years, 15 days	Liberal National	Gympie
	Fiona Simpson	Minister for Women; Minister for Women's Economic Security; Minister for Aboriginal and Torres Strait Islander Partnerships and Multiculturalism	1 November 2024	Incumbent	2 years, 15 days	Liberal National	Maroochydore
	Andrew Powell	Minister for the Environment; Minister for Tourism; Minister for Science and Innovation	1 November 2024	Incumbent	2 years, 15 days	Liberal National	Glass House
	Amanda Camm	Minister for Families, Seniors and Disabilities; Minister for Child Safety; Minister for the Prevention of Domestic and Family Violence	1 November 2024	Incumbent	2 years, 15 days	Liberal National	Whitsunday
	Tim Mander	Minister for Sport and Racing; Minister for the Olympic and Paralympic Games	1 November 2024	Incumbent	2 years, 15 days	Liberal National	Everton
	Steve Minnikin	Minister for Customer Services and Open Data; Minister for Small and Family Business	1 November 2024	Incumbent	2 years, 15 days	Liberal National	Chatsworth
	Christian Rowan	Leader of the House; Assistant Minister to the Premier	1 November 2024	Incumbent	2 years, 15 days	Liberal National	Moggill

=== Gubernatorial and Supreme Court Justices ===
As incumbent Governor Jeannette Young's term ends by convention in 2026, Crisafulli will choose the next Governor of Queensland. Within his first four-year term, more than 4 current Justice's of the Supreme Court of Queensland will reach the mandatory retirement age of 70, therefore Crisafulli will nominate new justices to be approved and appointed by the governor.

Although the premier technically has the power the choose Magistrates Court of Queensland judges, this is usually delegated solely to the attorney-general whilst the AG and premier confer for the appointment of supreme court justices.

=== Public service ===
As Premier of Queensland, Crisafulli has the authority to appoint senior figures in the public service, including departmental heads.

Shortly after his appointment to the Premiership, Crisafulli fired 10 directors-general of several government agencies.

Immediately following Crisafulli's election win, he contacted Director-General of Queensland's Department of Premier and Cabinet Mike Kaiser to terminate his position as director-general. This was anticipated by Kaiser, who left his position peacefully, congratulating the premier for his election. Kaiser subsequently showed his support for the convention of a premier having the ability to hire and fire departmental staff. Following this, Crisafulli named public servant David Mackie as Kaiser's successor.

Shortly after Crisafulli's appointment, he relieved long-serving Queensland Health director-general Mike Walsh of his duties, in favour of the department's previous chief operating officer, David Rosengren. In the same round of re-appointments, Crisafulli named Rob Seiler as director-general of the Department of Families, Seniors, Disability Services and Child Safety, as well as appointing various other directors-general in an acting capacity.

Crisafulli's public service leadership as of November 2024
Director-General or Commissioner	Department/Agency	Appointing government	Acting or full-capacity
John Sosso	Department of State Development, Infrastructure and Planning	Crisafulli/LNP	Full-capacity
David Rosengren	Queensland Health	Crisafulli/LNP	Full-capacity
Trish O’Callaghan	Department of the Environment, Tourism, Science and Innovation	Crisafulli/LNP	Full-capacity
David Mackie	Department of the Premier and Cabinet	Crisafulli/LNP	Acting
Rachel Crossland	Queensland Treasury	Crisafulli/LNP	Acting
Brigita Cunnington	Department of Justice	Crisafulli/LNP	Acting
Sharon Schimming	Department of Education	Crisafulli/LNP	Acting
Kathy Parton	Department of Women, Aboriginal and Torres Strait Islander Partnerships and Multiculturalism	Crisafulli/LNP	Acting
Rob Seiler	Department of Families, Seniors, Disability Services and Child Safety	Crisafulli/LNP	Acting
Steven Koch	Department of Customer Services, Open Data and Small and Family Business	Crisafulli/LNP	Acting
Peter McKay	Department of Finance, Trade, Employment and Training	Labor	Full-capacity
Graham Fraine	Department of Natural Resources and Mines, Manufacturing and Regional and Rural Development	Labor	Full-capacity
Stephan Gollschewski	Queensland Police Service	Labor	Full-capacity
Paul Stewart	Queensland Corrective Services	Labor	Full-capacity
Bob Gee	Department of Youth Justice and Victim Support	Labor	Full-capacity
Sally Stannard	Department of Transport and Main Roads	Labor	Full-capacity
Linda Dobe	Department of Local Government, Water and Volunteers	Labor	Full-capacity
Steve Smith	Queensland Fire Department	Labor	Full-capacity
Mark Cridland	Department of Housing and Public Works	Labor	Full-capacity
Graeme Bolton	Department of Primary Industries	Labor	Full-capacity
Andrew Hopper	Department of Sport, Racing and Olympic and Paralympic Games	Labor	Full-capacity

== Legislative agenda ==
=== Crime ===
As a part of Crisafulli's campaign on crime, he announced on 29 October 2024 that his 'Making Queensland Safer Laws' would pass the Parliament before Christmas. These prospective laws have been met with criticism by organisations such as Amnesty International, particularly on the basis of 'adult crime, adult time' which would give equivalence of criminal sentencing between adult and youth convicts. The Crisafulli government later halted an inquiry into youth crime, in favour of passing these laws before the inquiry could report its findings.

The laws officially passed the parliament on 12 December 2024.

=== Truth-telling and treaty ===
Just after a week into his premiership, Crisafulli announced that due to the results of the 2023 Australian Indigenous Voice referendum, he would repeal the Path to Treaty Act 2023 and suspend the Truth-Telling and Hearing Inquiry, chaired by Aboriginal lawyer Joshua Creamer. Labor governments in Queensland, Victoria, and South Australia took action to dissent from the public opinion revealed in the 2023 referendum and instead implement state-based recommendations of the Uluru Statement from the Heart including South Australia's implementation of an indigenous voice to Parliament.

Federal Minister for Indigenous Australians, Malarndirri McCarthy, criticised Crisafulli's haste with repealing the act and stopping the inquiry, telling him to "hold your [Crisafulli's] horses".

== See also ==
- Liberal National Party of Queensland
- 2024 Queensland state election
- Crisafulli ministry
- Chief ministership of Lia Finocchiaro
- Premiership of Jeremy Rockliff
- Allan government
