= List of Queensland Government departments =

State government departments of Queensland

There are 21 Queensland Government departments, each responsible for delivering a portfolio of government legislation and policy. Each portfolio area is led by a minister who is a senior member of the governing party in the state Legislative Assembly. The minister is formally appointed by the governor of Queensland on behalf of the monarch, but is appointed on the recommendation of the premier. Each government department is led by a director-general or commissioner, who reports to the responsible minister. The minister has responsibility for instituting government policy and setting the department's priorities, whereas the director-general or commissioner leads the department operationally and is employed under the state's Public Sector Act 2022.

In addition to departments, there are also several government-owned corporations such as the Queensland Treasury Corporation and Energy Queensland.

== List of government departments ==
In November 2024, the newly elected Crisafulli ministry introduced machinery of government changes to dissolve the former Department of Energy and Climate and restructure the remaining departments. The state government departments are now:

- Department of Customer Services, Open Data and Small and Family Business
- Department of Education
- Department of the Environment, Tourism, Science and Innovation
- Department of Families, Seniors, Disability Services and Child Safety
- Department of Housing and Public Works
- Department of Justice
- Department of Local Government, Water and Volunteers
- Department of Natural Resources and Mines, Manufacturing and Regional and Rural Development
- Department of the Premier and Cabinet
- Department of Primary Industries
- Queensland Corrective Services
- Queensland Fire Department
- Queensland Health (Department of Health)
- Queensland Police Service
- Queensland Treasury
- Department of Sport, Racing and Olympic and Paralympic Games
- Department of State Development, Infrastructure and Planning
- Department of Trade, Employment and Training
- Department of Transport and Main Roads
- Department of Women, Aboriginal and Torres Strait Islander Partnerships and Multiculturalism
- Department of Youth Justice and Victim Support

== List of government agencies ==
Most government portfolios are delivered through a combination of a department and supporting agencies, authorities, or commissions with varying levels of independence.

Portfolio/department	Supporting agencies
Families, Seniors, Disability Services and Child Safety	Child and Family Services
Housing and Public Works	Queensland Housing Commission; Residential Tenancies Authority
Justice	Queensland Corrective Services; Crime and Corruption Commission; Electoral Commission of Queensland; Legal Services Commissioner; Legal Aid Queensland; Office of Liquor and Gaming Regulation; Queensland Human Rights Commission; Queensland Law Reform Commissioner; Queensland State Archives; Office of the Director of Public Prosecutions; Office of the Information Commissioner; Office of the Public Guardian; Office of the Queensland Ombudsman; Parole Boards; The Public Advocate; The Public Trustee; Prostitution Licensing Authority
State Development, Infrastructure and Planning	Brisbane 2032 Coordination Office; Economic Development Queensland
Environment, Tourism, Science and Innovation	Tourism and Events Queensland
Transport and Main Roads	Translink; Queensland Rail
Education	Queensland Curriculum and Assessment Authority
Fire	Queensland Fire Department
Health	Clinical Excellence Queensland; eHealth Queensland; Forensic Science Queensland; Queensland Ambulance Service; Queensland Public Health and Scientific Services; Health and Wellbeing Queensland; Hospital and Health Services; Office of the Health Ombudsman
Police	Queensland State Emergency Service
Treasury	Queensland Treasury Corporation; Queensland Government Insurance Fund

== See also ==
- Queensland Government
- Defunct government agencies of Queensland
