= Crisafulli ministry =

Current cabinet of the Australian state of Queensland

- 43rd Cabinet of Queensland

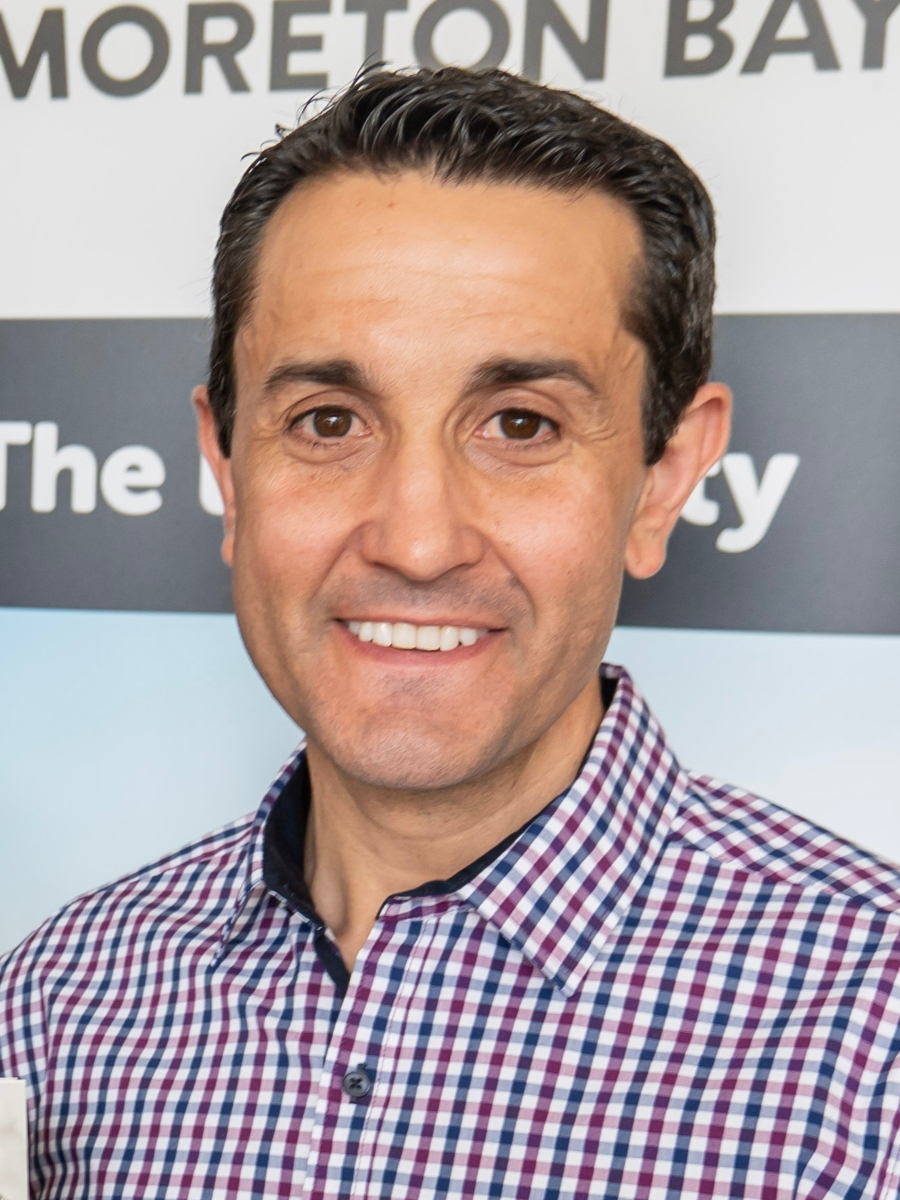
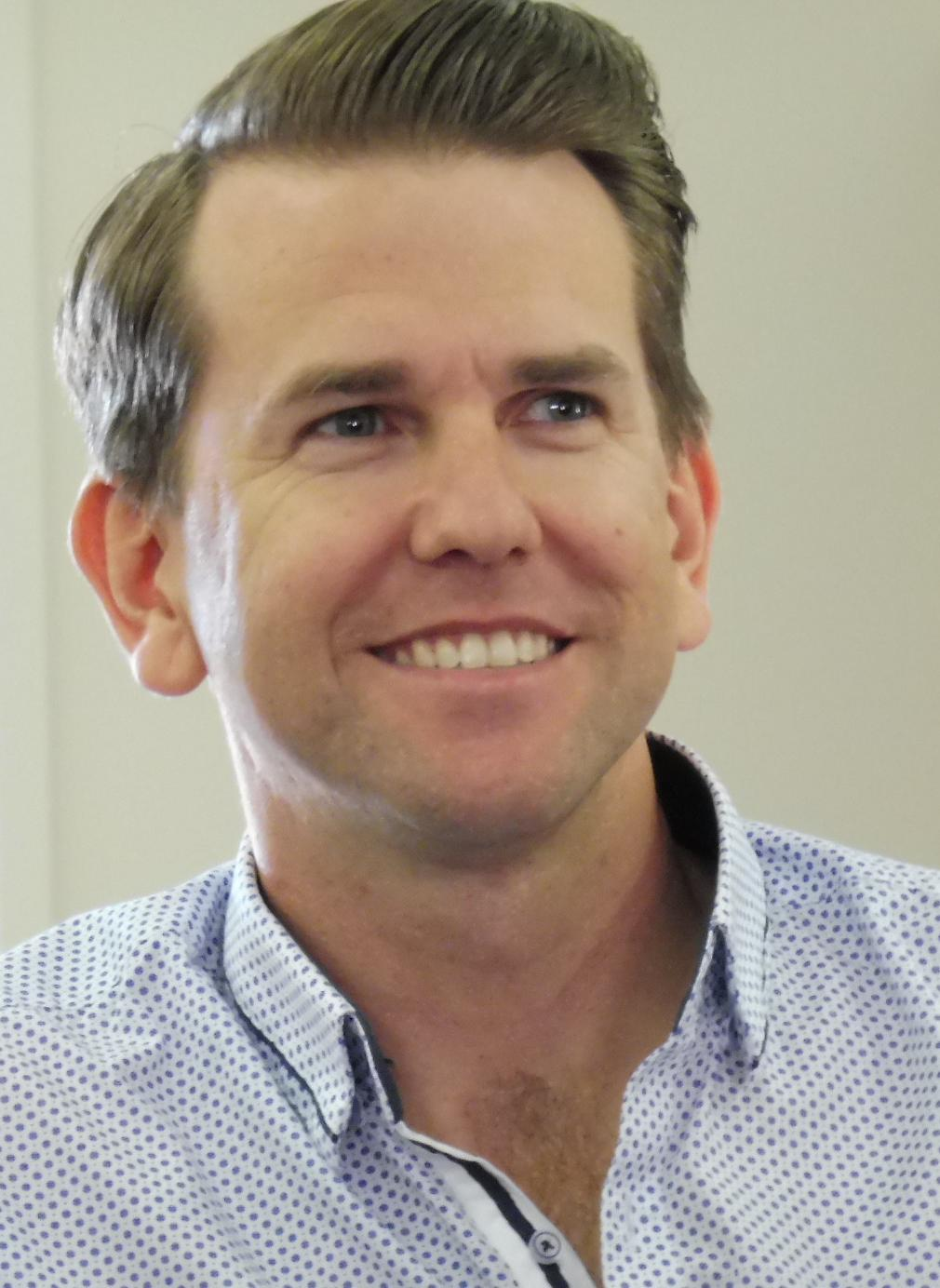
- David Crisafulli (Premier) Jarrod Bleijie (Deputy Premier)
- Date formed: 28 October 2024

People and organisations
- Monarch: Charles III
- Governor: Jeanette Young
- Premier: David Crisafulli
- Premier's history: Premiership of David Crisafulli
- Deputy Premier: Jarrod Bleijie
- No. of ministers: 19
- Member party: Liberal National
- Status in legislature: Majority 52 / 93 (56%)
- Opposition cabinet: Miles shadow ministry
- Opposition party: Labor
- Opposition leader: Steven Miles

History
- Election: 2024 Queensland election
- Legislature term: 2024–2028
- Predecessor: Miles

The Crisafulli ministry is the current ministry of the Government of Queensland led by David Crisafulli. Crisafulli led the Liberal National Party (LNP) to its second election victory (the first being 2012) since its formation in 2008 after the merger of the state branches of the Liberal and National parties.

== Cabinet outlook ==
=== Initial composition ===
On 27 October 2024, Crisafulli announced that he and Deputy Premier Jarrod Bleijie would be sworn in as an interim two-person cabinet. Crisafulli and Bleijie were formally sworn in by Governor Jeanette Young on 28 October.

Portrait	Minister	Portfolio	Took office	Left office	Duration of tenure	Party	Electorate
Cabinet Ministers
	David Crisafulli	Premier; Minister for Health, Mental Health and Ambulance Services and Minister for Women; Minister for Housing, Local Government and Planning and Minister for Public Works; Minister for Police and Community Safety; Minister for Treaty, Minister for Aboriginal and Torres Strait Islander Partnerships, Minister for Communities and Minister for the Arts; Minister for Education and Minister for Youth Justice; Minister for Regional Development and Manufacturing and Minister for Water; Minister for Resources and Critical Minerals; Minister for Fire and Disaster Recovery and Minister for Corrective Services; Minister for Tourism and Sport	28 October 2024	1 November 2024 (all offices except Premier)	1 year, 7 days	Liberal National	Broadwater
	Jarrod Bleijie	Deputy Premier; Treasurer and Minister for Trade and Investment; Minister for State Development and Infrastructure, Minister for Industrial Relations and Minister for Racing; Attorney-General and Minister for Justice and Minister for the Prevention of Domestic and Family Violence; Minister for Energy and Clean Economy Jobs; Minister for Agricultural Industry Development and Fisheries and Minister for Rural Communities; Minister for the Environment and the Great Barrier Reef and Minister for Science and Innovation; Minister for Transport and Main Roads and Minister for Digital Services; Minister for Employment and Small Business and Minister for Training and Skills Development; Minister for Child Safety, Minister for Seniors and Disability Services and Minister for Multicultural Affairs	28 October 2024	1 November 2024 (all offices except those listed below)	1 year, 7 days	Liberal National	Kawana

=== Full ministry ===
On 1 November 2024, the full ministry was formally sworn in, as follows:

Portrait	Minister	Portfolio	Took office	Left office	Duration of tenure	Party	Electorate
Cabinet Ministers
	David Crisafulli	Premier; Minister for Veterans	28 October 2024	Incumbent	1 year, 7 days	Liberal National	Broadwater
	Jarrod Bleijie	Deputy Premier; Minister for State Development and Infrastructure; Minister for Industrial Relations	28 October 2024	Incumbent	1 year, 7 days	Liberal National	Kawana
	David Janetzki	Treasurer; Minister for Energy; Minister for Homes	1 November 2024	Incumbent	1 year, 3 days	Liberal National	Toowoomba South
	Ros Bates	Minister for Finance and Trade; Minister for Employment and Training	1 November 2024	Incumbent	1 year, 3 days	Liberal National	Mudgeeraba
	Tim Nicholls	Minister for Health and Ambulance Services	1 November 2024	Incumbent	1 year, 3 days	Liberal National	Clayfield
	Deb Frecklington	Attorney-General; Minister for Justice; Minister for Integrity	1 November 2024	Incumbent	1 year, 3 days	Liberal National	Nanango
	Dale Last	Minister for Natural Resources and Mines; Minister for Manufacturing; Minister for Rural and Regional Development	1 November 2024	Incumbent	1 year, 3 days	Liberal National	Burdekin
	John-Paul Langbroek	Minister for Education; Minister for the Arts	1 November 2024	Incumbent	1 year, 3 days	Liberal National	Surfers Paradise
	Dan Purdie	Minister for Police and Community Safety	1 November 2024	Incumbent	1 year, 3 days	Liberal National	Ninderry
	Laura Gerber	Minister for Youth Justice and Victim Support; Minister for Corrective Services	1 November 2024	Incumbent	1 year, 3 days	Liberal National	Currumbin
	Brent Mickelberg	Minister for Transport and Main Roads	1 November 2024	Incumbent	1 year, 3 days	Liberal National	Buderim
	Ann Leahy	Minister for Local Government; Minister for Water; Minister for Fire and Emergency Services; Minister for Disaster Recovery; Minister for Volunteers	1 November 2024	Incumbent	1 year, 3 days	Liberal National	Warrego
	Sam O'Connor	Minister for Housing and Public Works; Minister for Youth	1 November 2024	Incumbent	1 year, 3 days	Liberal National	Bonney
	Tony Perrett	Minister for Primary Industries	1 November 2024	Incumbent	1 year, 3 days	Liberal National	Gympie
	Fiona Simpson	Minister for Women; Minister for Women's Economic Security; Minister for Aboriginal and Torres Strait Islander Partnerships and Multiculturalism	1 November 2024	Incumbent	1 year, 3 days	Liberal National	Maroochydore
	Andrew Powell	Minister for the Environment; Minister for Tourism; Minister for Science and Innovation	1 November 2024	Incumbent	1 year, 3 days	Liberal National	Glass House
	Amanda Camm	Minister for Families, Seniors and Disabilities; Minister for Child Safety; Minister for the Prevention of Domestic and Family Violence	1 November 2024	Incumbent	1 year, 3 days	Liberal National	Whitsunday
	Tim Mander	Minister for Sport and Racing; Minister for the Olympic and Paralympic Games	1 November 2024	Incumbent	1 year, 3 days	Liberal National	Everton
	Steve Minnikin	Minister for Customer Services and Open Data; Minister for Small and Family Business	1 November 2024	Incumbent	1 year, 3 days	Liberal National	Chatsworth
	Christian Rowan	Leader of the House; Assistant Minister to the Premier	1 November 2024	Incumbent	1 year, 3 days	Liberal National	Moggill

Parliament of Queensland
Preceded by Miles ministry	Crisafulli ministry 2024–present	Incumbent
