= 2020 Currumbin state by-election =

- 28 March 2020

The district of Currumbin in the Legislative Assembly of Queensland
- Turnout: 71.5% ▼14.6
	First party	Second party	Third party
Candidate	Laura Gerber	Kaylee Campradt	Sally Spain
Party	Liberal National	Labor	Greens
Popular vote	10,071	8,790	2,530
Percentage	43.8%	38.2%	11.0%
Swing	▼3.9	▲2.6	▼0.7
2PP	51.2%	48.8%
2PP swing	▼2.1	▲2.1
- Map of the Electoral district of Currumbin since the 2017 state election
MP before election
Jann Stuckey
Liberal National
Elected MP
Laura Gerber
Liberal National

A by-election was held for the seat of Currumbin in the Legislative Assembly of Queensland on 28 March 2020 following the resignation of Jann Stuckey on 1 February 2020. The by-election was held on the same day as the Bundamba by-election and the statewide local government elections.

Laura Gerber won the by-election, holding the seat for the Liberal National Party.

== Key dates ==
Date	Event
6 February 2020	Issue of the writ
12 February 2020	Close of electoral rolls
13 February 2020	Close of nominations
16 March 2020	Early voting begins
28 March 2020	Polling day, between the hours of 8 am and 6 pm

== Candidates ==
Candidate nominations in ballot paper order
Liberal National	Laura Gerber	Solicitor and Commonwealth prosecutor.
Greens	Sally Spain	Teacher and activist
One Nation	Nicholas Bettany	Unknown
Labor	Kaylee Campradt	President of the Parents and Citizen's Association (P&C) Queensland.

== Opinion polling ==
Currumbin by-election polling
Date	Firm	Commissioned by	Sample	Primary vote					TPP vote
				LNP	ALP	GRN	ON	OTH (Note: Also includes 'Undecided'.)	LNP	ALP
22 March 2020	UComms	The Courier Mail	~700	38.7%	30.6%	11.8%	8.9%	9.9%	50%	50%
2017 Queensland state election				47.7%	35.6%	11.7%	-	5.0%	53.3%	46.7%

== Results ==
Currumbin state by-election, 28 March 2020
Party	Candidate	Votes	%	±%
Liberal National	Laura Gerber	10,071	43.8	−3.9
Labor	Kaylee Campradt	8,790	38.2	+2.6
Greens	Sally Spain	2,530	11.0	−0.7
One Nation	Nicholas Bettany	1,594	6.9	+6.9
Total formal votes		22,985	91.9	−3.4
Informal votes		2,023	8.1	+3.4
Turnout		25,008	71.5	−14.6
Two-party-preferred result
Liberal National	Laura Gerber	11,776	51.2	−2.1
Labor	Kaylee Campradt	11,209	48.8	+2.1
Liberal National hold		Swing	−2.1	
