= Executive Building =

Former building in Brisbane, Australia

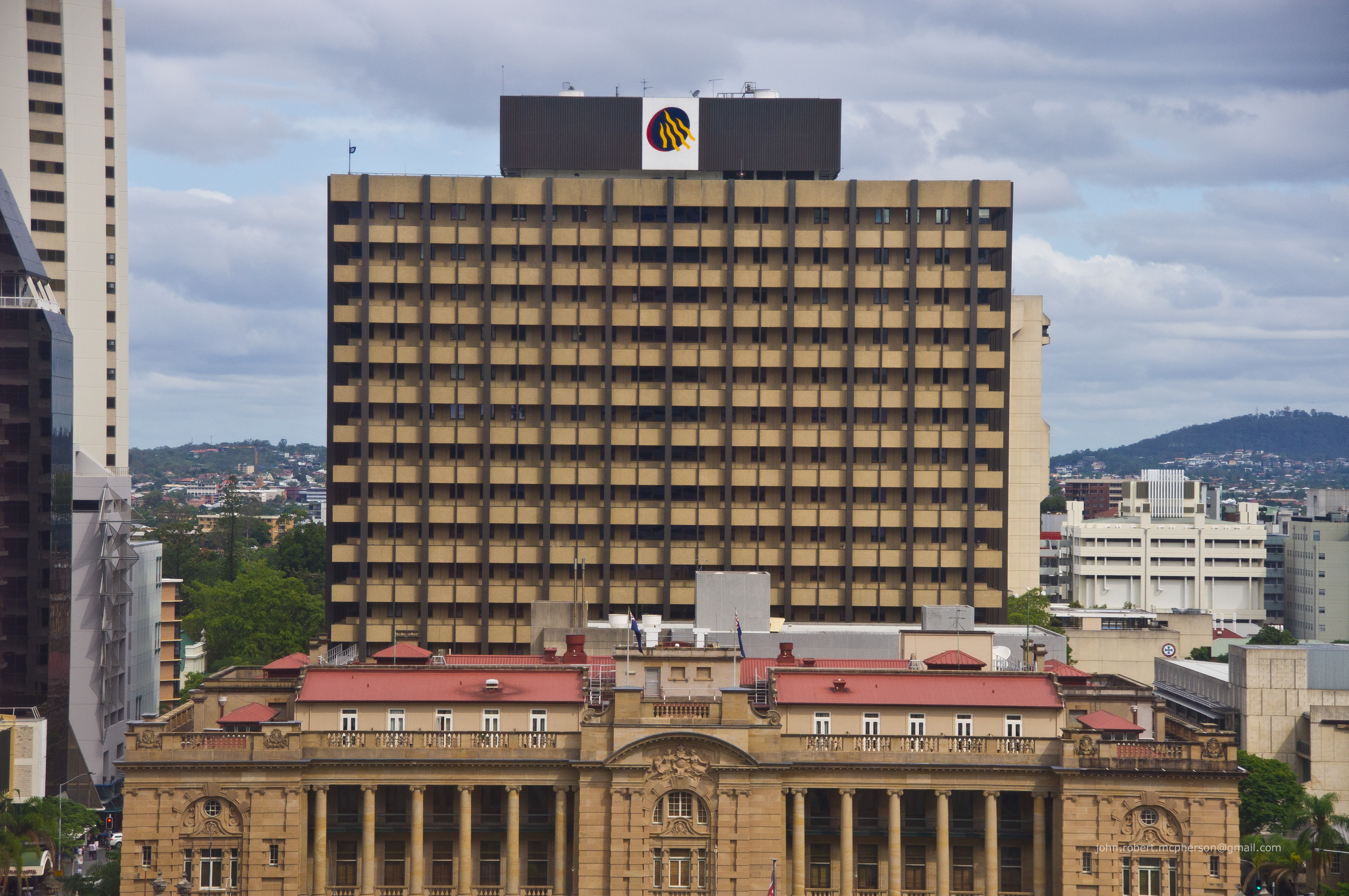
- The Executive Building prior to its demolition

- Location within Queensland
- Alternative names: The Tower of Power; Sir Joh's citadel

General information
- Status: Demolished
- Type: Government offices
- Architectural style: Brutalist
- Location: 100 George Street, Brisbane, Queensland, Australia
- Coordinates: 27.4712°S 153.0246°E
- Construction started: 1968
- Completed: 1970
- Opened: 27 April 1971
- Closed: 2016
- Demolished: 2017
- Owner: Queensland Government

Height
- Height: 60 m (200 ft)

Technical details
- Floor count: 15

Design and construction
- Architect: Chief Architect of the Department of Works Alfs Kamols
- Main contractor: EA Watts Pty Ltd

The Executive Building, nicknamed the Tower of Power, was a 15-storey office building at 100 George Street, Brisbane, Queensland, Australia. The building was completed in 1970, and stood at a height of 60 metres. It contained the offices of the premier and cabinet of Queensland, as well as the headquarters of several government departments. The building was closed in 2016 and demolished in 2017 to make way for the Queen’s Wharf development. It was the tallest building to have been demolished in Brisbane City.

== History ==
The Executive Building was first proposed by the Queensland Government in the 1960s, with invitations extended to various Australian and international architects to submit design proposals. Chief Architect of the Department of Works, Alfs Kamols, was selected, finalising the building's design by October 1965. The building featured beams clad with architectural bronze sheeting and concrete facade walls, expressing the sub-tropical climate of Brisbane. In October 1967, a contract was awarded to EA Watts Pty Ltd for $7 million dollars, with the formal contract being signed on 14 March 1968. Shortly thereafter, construction began in 1968 and continued through to 1970. The structure included a three-level basement that was dug 39 feet into Brisbane's bedrock, and was intended to be used as a fallout shelter in the event of a nuclear war. The completed building had approximately 12,000 m² of floor space. On 27 April 1971, the Executive Building was opened by then-premier Joh Bjelke-Petersen. On the same day, the first cabinet meeting was held on the 13th floor. The building then served as the workplace for the next eight Queensland premiers. At the time of its opening, the Executive Building housed six departments, including the Premier's Department, Treasury Department, Coordinator-General's Department, Public Services Board, Auditor-General's Department, and the Department of Works.

=== 1975 bomb attack ===
On 19 November 1975, a letter bomb sent to Joh Bjelke-Petersen exploded on the 14th floor of the building—only 40 metres from his office—hurling wire shrapnel at two mailroom officers. At the time, Bjelke-Petersen was on a Royal Australian Air Force plane bound for Mackay, Queensland. A second letter bomb was intended for the prime minister; however, it was discovered by x-ray and safely defused. Both officers were hospitalised, with 24-year-old Keith McFarlane undergoing surgery at Princess Alexandra Hospital for a severe eye injury while 34-year-old Gary Kross sustained superficial lacerations and was admitted to the Royal Brisbane Hospital. The letter bomb was mailed from the suburb of Drummoyne in Sydney. Despite investigations, no arrests were made. Following the incident, a second bodyguard and a bulletproof vest were assigned to the premier.

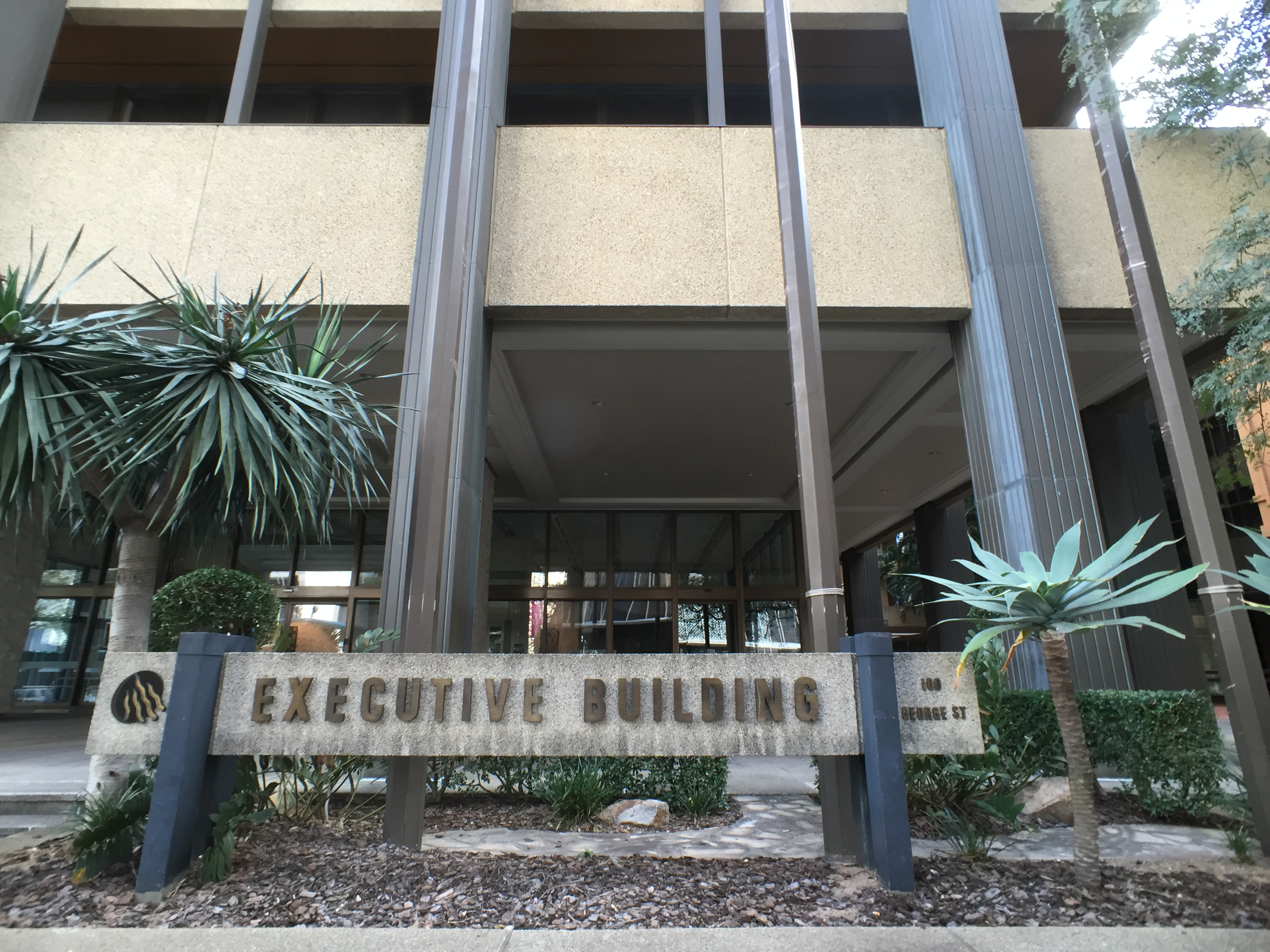
Entrance sign of the Executive Building.

=== History from 1985–2016 ===
In February 1985, the South East Queensland Electricity Board industrial dispute led to widespread blackouts in Brisbane. However, the building's power remained active due to the presence of backup generators. The Sydney Morning Herald subsequently referred to the building as "Sir Joh's citadel", after lights in the premier's office stayed on despite the power outage. During Sir Joh's tenure in the Executive Building, his office was located on the 14th floor and featured a secret stairwell that led to the cabinet room on the 13th floor, so he didn't have to leave by the lifts. After the premier's office moved to the 15th floor, the stairwell was boarded up, and remained so until the building's demolition in 2017. The Executive Building received many celebrities and dignitaries over its lifetime, including Canadian singer Michael Bublé and former Soviet leader Mikhail Gorbachev.

In 2015, the Labor Party was opposed to the construction of 1 William Street and the Queen's Wharf development. However, both projects proceeded nonetheless. On 10 December 2016, the Executive Building was officially closed, with guided tours offered to the public prior to the commencement of demolition.

=== Premiers ===
Over its almost five-decade lifespan, the Executive Building hosted the following premiers:

- Sir Joh Bjelke-Petersen (April 1971 – 1 December 1987)
- Michael Ahern (1 December 1987 – 22 September 1989)
- Russell Cooper (22 September 1989 – 2 December 1989)
- Wayne Goss (2 December 1989 – 20 February 1996)
- Rob Borbidge (20 February 1996 – 26 June 1998)
- Peter Beattie (26 June 1998 – 13 September 2007)
- Anna Bligh (13 September 2007 – 26 March 2012)
- Campbell Newman (26 March 2012 – 14 February 2015)
- Annastacia Palaszczuk (14 February 2015 – December 2023)

=== Demolition ===
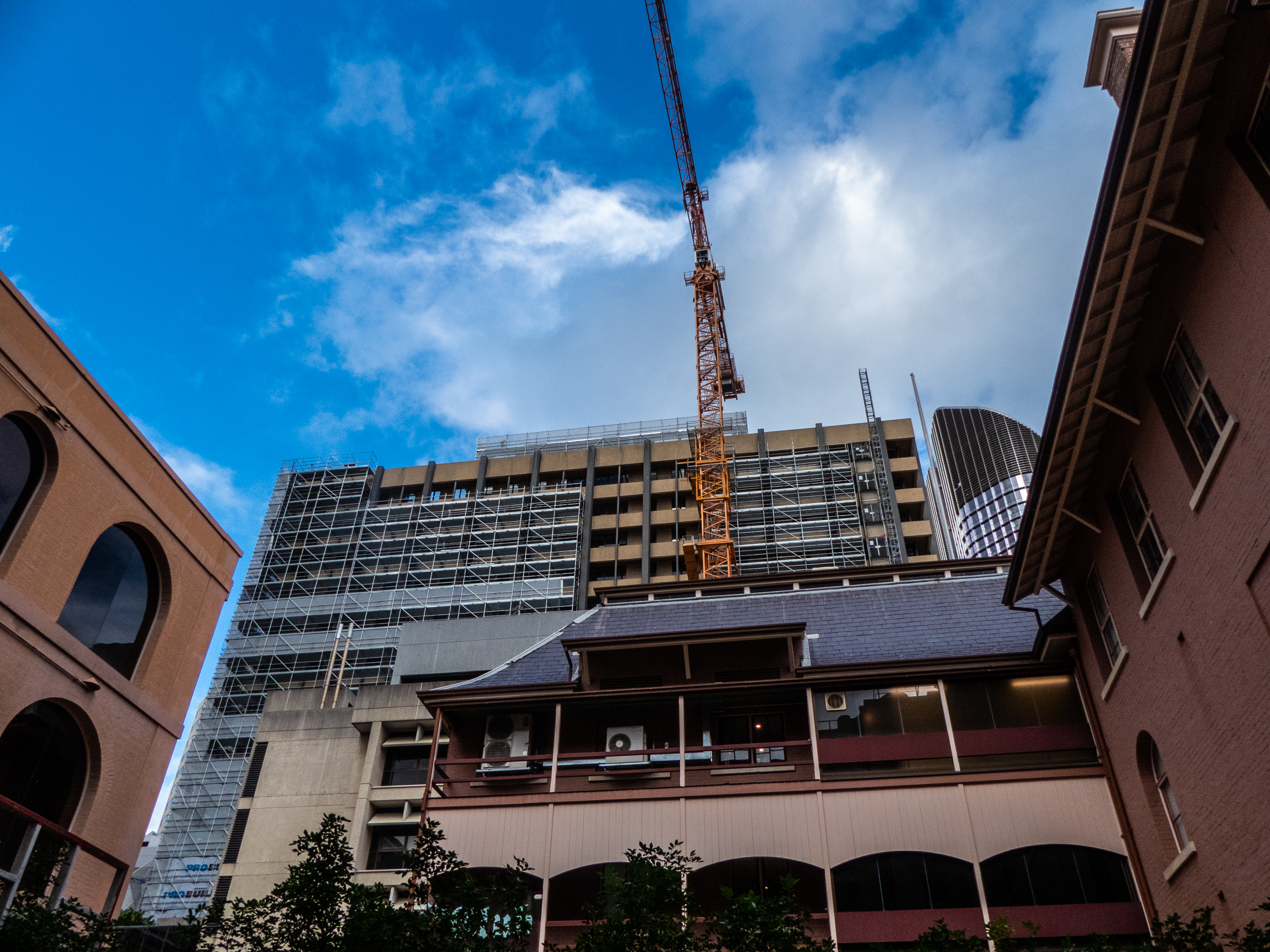
Demolition of the Executive Building.

In 2017, the building was wrapped in scaffolding, and a 4.5 tonne excavator was lifted onto the roof for the process of hard demolition. The building was stripped from the inside and outside before each floor was dismantled by the excavator.

== Design ==
Two prominent signs were installed on either side of the parapet atop the building. The idea of logos emblazoned on the Executive Building was coined by Joh Bjelke-Petersen during the building's opening in April 1971. Originally, he oversaw the installation of rooftop signs which bore the state's coat of arms. In April 2000, a new logo was designed by local architect and designer, Michael Bryce, depicting a sunburst image. However, the design choice faced criticism both internally and externally.
