= Office of the Information Commissioner =

Office of the Information Commissioner may refer to:

- Information Commissioner's Office, the UK non-departmental public body and regulator for data protection
- Office of the Information Commissioner of Canada
- Office of the Information Commissioner (New South Wales), the New South Wales government agency within the Office of the Information and Privacy Commission (New South Wales)
- Office of the Information Commissioner Queensland, an agency of the Department of Justice and Attorney-General
- Office of the Information Commissioner (Ireland) is the official charged with regulating the Irish Freedom of Information Act.
