= Queen's Wharf, Brisbane =

Multipurpose precinct in Brisbane, Queensland

Queen's Wharf
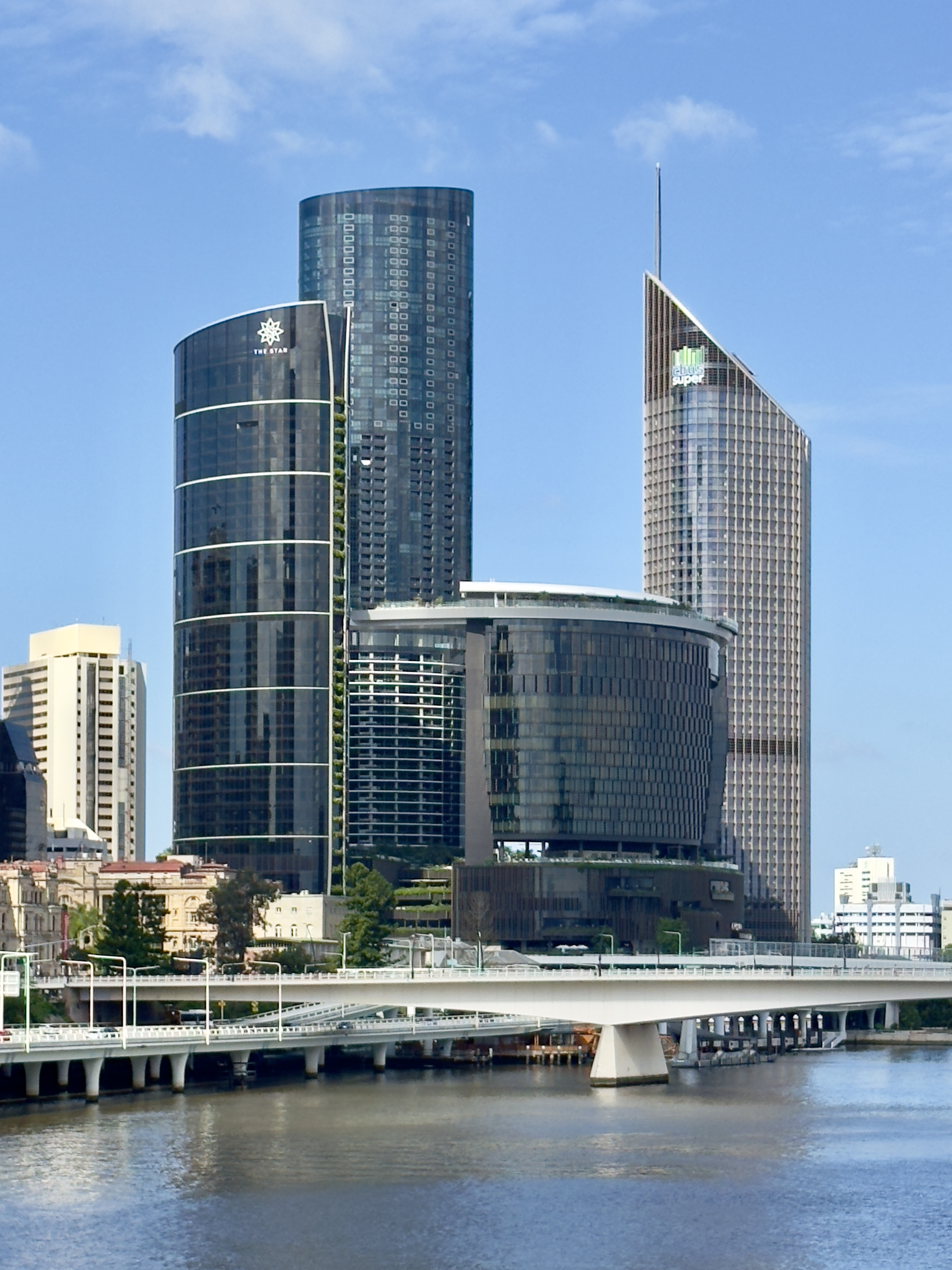
- Queen’s Wharf and the Brisbane CBD in 2025
- Interactive map of the Queen's Wharf area

General information
- Type: Mixed use
- Architectural style: Contemporary
- Location: 33 William Street, Brisbane, Queensland, Australia
- Coordinates: 27.474231°S 153.025214°E
- Cost: A$3.6 billion

Height
- Height: T1: 190 m (623 ft); T2: 101 m (331 ft); T3: 101 m (331 ft); T4: 231.1 m (758 ft); T5: 250 m (820 ft); T6: 160 m (524.9 ft)

Technical details
- Floor count: T1: 43; T2: 26; T3: 26; T4: 63; T5: 71; T6: 45
- Grounds: 26 hectares

Design and construction
- Architecture firm: Cottee Parker
- Developer: Destination Brisbane Consortium
- Structural engineer: Bornhorst & Ward and Robert Bird Group
- Services engineer: Ellis Air Conditioning (QLD)
- Civil engineer: Bornhorst & Ward
- Main contractor: Multiplex

Website
- queenswharfbrisbane.com.au
- Casino information
- Casino type: Land-based

Queen's Wharf is a multipurpose residential and entertainment precinct that is partially complete and partially under construction on either side of William Street in the central business district of Brisbane, Queensland. The megaproject is one of Australia's largest mixed-use precincts.

In July 2015, the Queensland Government announced the Destination Brisbane Consortium of Star Entertainment Group, Chow Tai Fook Enterprises and Far East Consortium, as the successful tenderer for the redevelopment. The mixed-use development will feature 2,000 apartments, 1,100 hotel rooms and a casino. The project also includes a 1,500 seat-ballroom and a Sky Deck observation platform with 360 degree views. The Sky Deck will be open to the public 24/7. There will be around 50 new cafés, bars and restaurants in the resort. An oblong sculpture by artist Lindy Lee is located at the George Street entrance.

The redevelopment includes the construction of four high-rise buildings and the Neville Bonner Bridge connecting the precinct to South Bank, as well as the repurposing of existing heritage-listed structures within the site. Work commenced in March 2018 with a preliminary 2022 completion date that was updated to 2023, and again delayed to April 2024. Treasury Casino closed on 25 August 2024. A staged opening began on 29 August 2024. Bad weather and the COVID-19 pandemic were blamed for the delay.

The project's location was criticised for its proximity to the historical heart of the city and government seat of power.

== History ==
Construction was undertaken by Multiplex. On-site demolition took over a year to complete. The Neville Bonner Building and the Executive Building had to be removed. The height of the Executive Building made it the tallest building demolition to take place in Queensland. More than 33,000 tonnes of rubble were created. Excavated rock was used to provide fill for the development of a car mall at Brisbane Airport. During excavation 134-year-old electrical cables were unearthed. Six basements were dug.

By October 2021 the lift cores for both the Dorsett hotel and Rosewood hotels had reached level 21. In the same month it was reported that 98 per cent of the residencies had been purchased.

In September 2022, the Sky Deck was raised into place. This involved the placement of a 175-tonne piece of steel 100 metres above ground level, between the two curved towers. The Sky Deck extends 250 metres around the top of two towers.

== Design and location ==
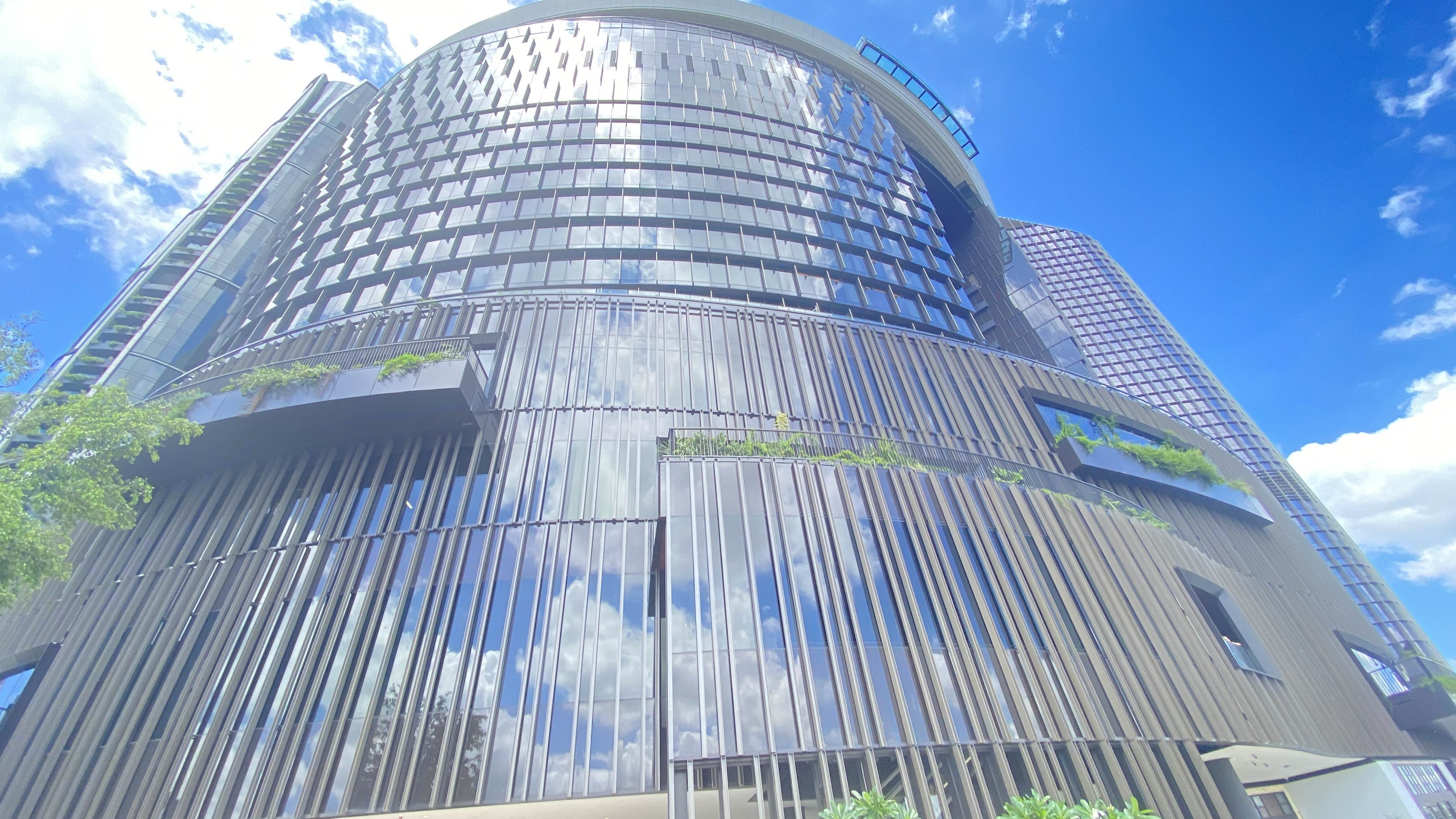
View of the Queens Wharf from the Neville Bonner Bridge

The design aims to integrate tourism, leisure and entertainment facilities in an underutilised part of the city. The site includes 11 state-owned heritage sites. Nine of the sites are open to the public. Queen's Wharf covers a total 12 hectares. Along the river a new mangrove walk will wind along the Riverside Expressway. The existing bikeway will be upgraded and a new waterline park has been built. Seven and a half hectares of space have been allocated for public use. The Sky Deck will be positioned 100 metres above William Street.

Queen's Wharf consists of four towers situated atop a seven-storey podium and a five-level basement. The tallest building is known as the Queen's Wharf Residence and is divided into Emerald, Ruby and Diamond tiers with a penthouse apartment.

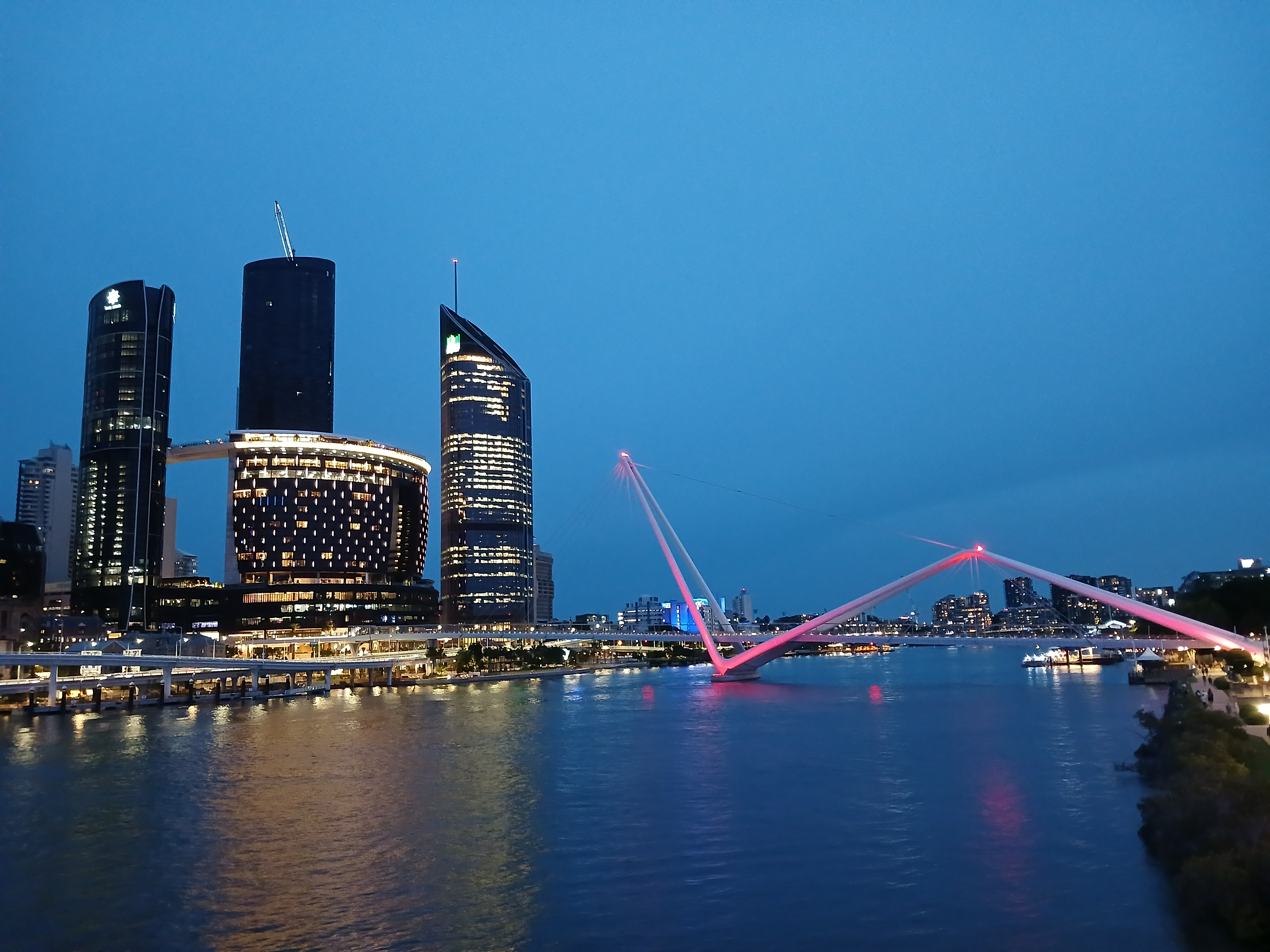
Queens Wharf and Neville Bonner Bridge at twilight

The complex utilises Building Information Modelling. A vacuum waste system will be used across the resort. It will incorporate a central waste handling facility.

=== Dining ===
Japanese fine dining will be available at Sokyo restaurant. Fat Noodle is bringing Luke Nguyen dishes featuring South East Asian flavours. Cucina Regina will serve Italian meals in a 160-seat restaurant, serving inside and out. Cicada Blu, an open-air bar and Euro-inspired eatery called Aloria will both be located on the Sky Deck. Velo Café is a two-storey riverside bikeway café built on the Bicentennial Bikeway that will cater to cyclists. Black Hide Steak & Seafood will move from the Treasury Brisbane to the new precinct into a 240-seat restaurant. It will be the largest of the three restaurants on the venue's terrace. The Latin American-inspired Azteca can seat 126 people. Lúc Lắc has created a lush, indoor-outdoor, tropical setting for an Indochine restaurant and bar that can seat 159 people.

=== Hotels ===
The integrated resort that includes three hotels in the complex are the Star Grand hotel, Dorsett hotel and Rosewood hotel. The luxury five star Star Grand hotel occupies towers two and three, which are the two curved towers. The Star Grand features 340 luxury rooms and a 360-degree signature cocktail bar. The Star's façade is equipped with 350 lighting pillars which are used for various lighting displays.

The Dorsett and Rosewood hotels are due to open by the end of 2026.

=== Casino ===
The casino was first managed by Star Entertainment on behalf of the consortium. Slot machines, three variants of blackjack, roulette, baccarat, six variants of poker, craps and sic-bo are available. Casino War and the Wheel are also played. The casino has approval for 2,500 poker machines with about 1,500 machines currently in operation. A set of escalators lead visitors to the high roller level.

In order to attempt to keep Star Entertainment afloat, the company was looking to sell its stake in The Star Brisbane. Chow Tai Fook and Far East Consortium would have assumed Star's stake in The Star Brisbane and would also assume all debts incurred by the property. In August 2025, Star Entertainment Group sold their stake in the development.

== See also ==
- List of megaprojects
- List of tallest buildings in Brisbane
- List of integrated resorts
