= Health and Wellbeing Queensland =

State health promotion agency of the Queensland Government

Agency overview
- Formed: 1 July 2019
- Jurisdiction: Queensland Government
- Motto: Making healthy happen
- Annual budget: ▼ A$43.4 million (2025–26)
- Agency executives: Stephen Ryan, Board Chair; Robyn Littlewood, Chief Executive
- Website: hw.qld.gov.au

Health and Wellbeing Queensland (HWQ) is a statutory agency in Queensland, Australia, responsible for health promotion in the state. HWQ is part of the Queensland Government but is distinct from the Queensland Health system. Formed on 1 July 2019 through the Health and Wellbeing Queensland Act 2019, the agency has the objective of improving the health of all Queenslanders through reducing the burden of chronic diseases and health inequality. Health and Wellbeing Queensland does not provide clinical services to Queenslanders directly, but instead funds health initiatives and programs and helps guide health policy development.

== Programs and initiatives ==
Health and Wellbeing Queensland runs or supports several programs aimed at improving the health of Queenslanders. Broadly, these programs are:

- Life Education: health promotion and education to school students.
- Good Sports Healthy Eating: improving the nutrition of school sports.
- Heart Foundation Walking: volunteer-run walking groups.
- Jamie's Ministry of Food: food and nutrition literacy and skills courses for Queenslanders in partnership with The Good Foundation.
- 10,000 Steps: promoting physical activity and achieving the recommended 10,000 steps per day.
- Get Healthy Service: up to 13 free personalised health coaching sessions for all Queenslanders.
- Healthy Tuckshop Support: promoting improved nutrition in school tuckshops.
- Deadly Choices Healthy Lifestyle Program: promotion within Indigenous Australian communities for increased health care usage, healthier eating, and increased physical exercise.
- QCWA Country Kitchens: food and nutrition programs in regional and remote Queensland.

=== Boost your Healthy ===
During the COVID-19 pandemic in Australia, Health and Wellbeing Queensland launched the Boost your Healthy initiative. The initiative, joined by the social media tag #BootCampQld, aims to increase physical activity, improve nutrition, and improve wellbeing of Queenslanders during lockdowns and restrictions. As part of this initiative, the agency partnered with the Queensland Country Women's Association (QCWA) to provide healthy cooking challenges to participants. The agency also joined 10,000 Steps, the Australian health promotion organisation of CQUniversity, in creating a collective 1 billion steps goal for Queenslanders during lockdown. Over 32 days, 5,874 Queenslanders from 320 postcodes logged 1.05 billion steps.

== Funding ==
Funding for Health and Wellbeing Queensland comes from the Queensland Parliament through annual appropriations in the state budget.

Between 2020 and 2024, the Queensland Budget will also provide A$158.6 million in funding to establish the agency, A$133.4 million of which is from appropriations within Queensland Health. The remaining funding from the Queensland Government is to establish and operate the Deadly Choices Health Lifestyle Program, which will attract A$8.6 million in funding to the agency every year.

== See also ==
- Queensland Health
- Queensland Government
- Health care in Australia
