= Merri Rose =

Australian politician

Member of the Queensland Legislative Assembly for Currumbin
- In office 19 September 1992 – 7 February 2004
- Preceded by: Trevor Coomber
- Succeeded by: Jann Stuckey

Personal details
- Born: Merrilyn Miriam Gittins; 24 January 1955 (age 71) Kilcoy, Queensland, Australia
- Party: Labor

Merrilyn Miriam Rose (born 24 January 1955) was a minister in the Beattie government and member for Currumbin in the Queensland Parliament.

== Early life ==
She was born Merrilyn Miriam Gittins in Kilcoy, Queensland in 1955 and attended Kilcoy State High School and St Rita's Clayfield.

== Career ==
Rose was elected as the member for Currumbin at the 1992 Queensland election. After the 2001 election, the Premier of Queensland, Peter Beattie, appointed her Minister for Tourism and Racing. She was appointed Minister for Tourism, Racing and Fair Trading in 2001.

Rose came under fire when it emerged that her son had driven her ministerial car to watch sporting events in Sydney, and also faced accusations of bullying staff. The controversy grew to a point that Beattie was forced to sack her from cabinet just before the 2004 election. At that election, Jann Stuckey of the Liberal Party soundly defeated Rose, who suffered a massive 17.7 percent swing against her.

== Blackmail conviction ==
Rose had trouble finding a job after the election, and sought an appointment in the Queensland public sector. On 30 May 2007, she pleaded guilty to demanding benefit with threats in October 2006, in relation to her efforts to gain such an appointment. Rose was sentenced to 18 months' jail the following day.

Documenting her experiences after three months in jail, Rose appeared on ABC Television's Australian Story series on 20 October 2008.

Parliament of Queensland
Preceded by Trevor Coomber	Member for Currumbin; 1992–2004	Succeeded by Jann Stuckey
