= 1 William Street, Brisbane =

Skyscraper in Brisbane, Queensland, housing the Queensland Government

1 William Street
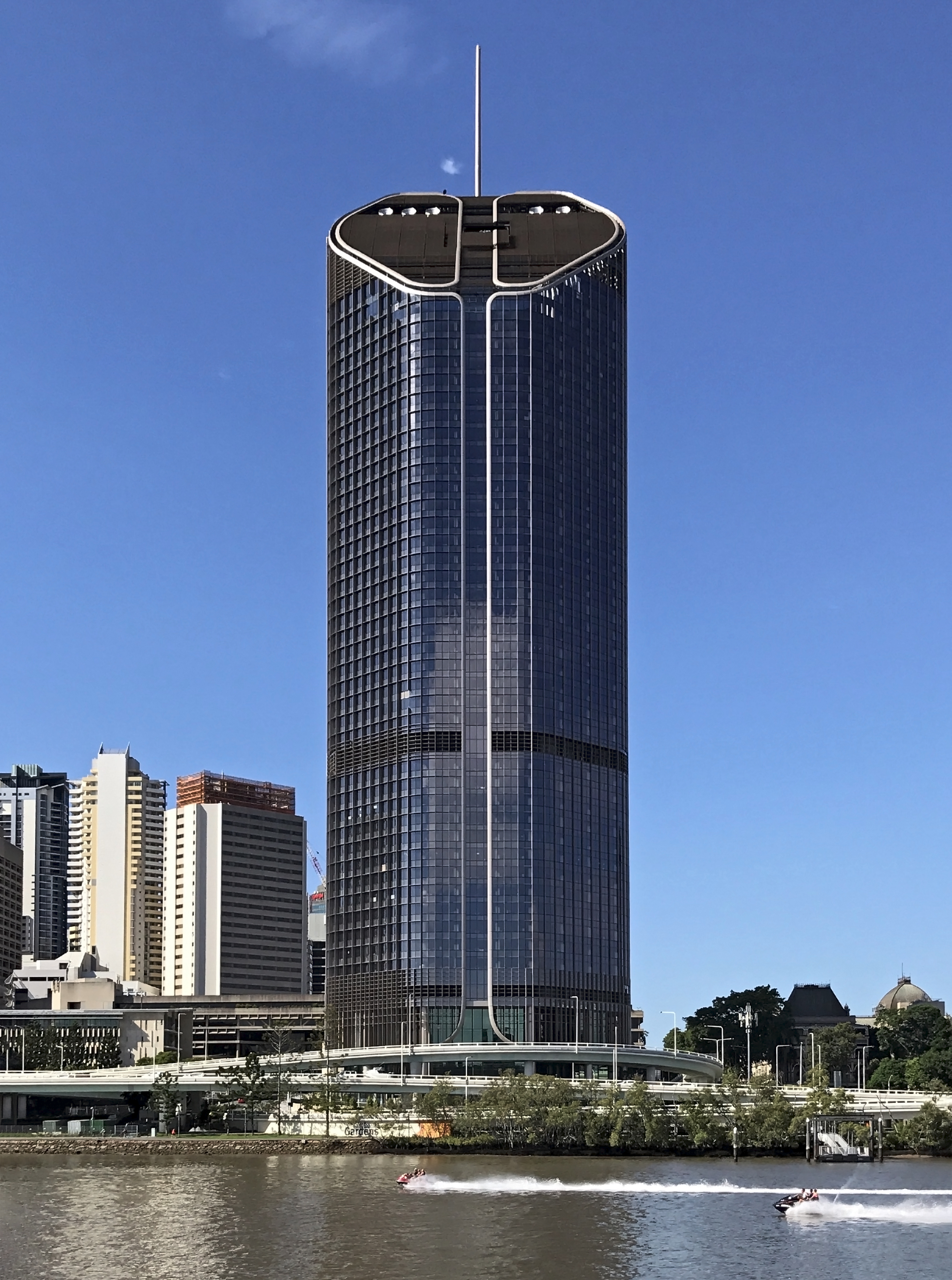
- 1 William Street

General information
- Status: Completed
- Type: Government office tower
- Architectural style: Modernist
- Location: Brisbane CBD, Brisbane, Australia
- Coordinates: 27.47512°S 153.0258°E
- Current tenants: Queensland Government
- Construction started: 4 March 2013
- Completed: October 2016
- Cost: A$650 million
- Client: Cbus
- Owner: Cbus Property (50%); IFM Investors (50%)
- Operator: JLL

Height
- Antenna spire: 267 m (876 ft)
- Top floor: 179.1 m (588 ft)

Technical details
- Floor count: 49
- Floor area: 76,022 m^{2} (818,290 sq ft)(lettable) 119,977 m^{2} (1,291,420 sq ft)(gross)
- Lifts/elevators: 24

Design and construction
- Architect: Woods Bagot
- Developer: Cbus
- Structural engineer: Hyder Consulting
- Services engineer: EMF Griffiths
- Main contractor: Brookfield Multiplex

Other information
- Parking: 318 spaces

Website
- 1williamstreet.com

1 William Street is a commercial skyscraper located at 1 William Street in Brisbane, Queensland, Australia. At 267 metres (876 ft), it is the third-tallest building in the city and 9th-tallest building in Australia as of 2025. The modernist office building is located in the Brisbane CBD, and in close proximity to Parliament House. The skyscraper was constructed for the Queensland Government as part of its plan for a renewed Government Administrative Precinct and to meet accommodation demands of a growing public service. It is often colloquially referred to as the Tower of Power due to the building housing all government ministers and most director-generals. The building was officially handed over in October 2016 with over 5,000 government staff relocating from previous facilities over six weekends.

== History of the site ==
The site was formerly bisected by Short Street and comprised a number of different allotments and uses. Buildings occupied the area as early as 1854 and it was used for a variety of functions including; manufacturing, warehousing, shipping, housing, and electricity generation.

The Queensland Government began purchasing the properties in the 1960s as part of their Government Precinct development scheme and began demolishing the existing buildings, some dating to the 1850s. The demolition of the adjacent Bellevue Hotel and construction of 80 George Street saw the spoil from there dumped on the 1 William Street site.

In 1974, the site was allocated for future government offices.

1 William Street is a 6,778-square-metre (72,960 sq ft) site, owned by the Queensland Government, and from 1982 until 2013 it was used as a government car park. The site encompasses a whole city block between William, Alice and Margaret streets and Riverside Expressway.

== Cultural heritage significance ==
Before the redevelopment project began, the site was excavated by the Environmental Resources Management (ERM), a consultancy, in 2013 to find cultural remnants. As a result, 137 archeological features and around 600 artefacts, including ceramics and glassware, dating from the 1850s through the 1900s, were found on the site. The archeological findings indicated the influence of Victorian values and the availability of different kinds of domestic materials among working-class residents that lived on the site during that period.

== Development ==
In August 2012, Expressions of Interest were called for from experienced organisations interested in bidding for the project. It was proposed that the site would be available to the successful party under a long-term lease arrangement and that the Queensland Government would take a long-term lease over approximately 75,000 m^{2} (810,000 sq ft) of the office space in the development.

In September 2012, six developers were shortlisted to develop proposals for a new high-rise tower. The shortlisted companies were Cbus, Lendlease, Brookfield, Westfield, Leighton Properties and Grocon.

In December 2012, Cbus was announced as the developer for 1 William Street. The developer was granted a 99-year lease over the site and a guaranteed 15-year government lease for 60,000 m^{2} (650,000 sq ft) of office space.

== Design ==
1 William Street has a gross floor area of 119,977 m^{2} (1,291,420 sq ft) and a net lettable area of 74,853 m^{2} (805,710 sq ft) of office space, excluding retail which covers 1,169 m^{2} (12,580 sq ft). The design includes 318 car bays.

About 60,000 m^{2} (650,000 sq ft) has been allocated for government space, leaving around 15,000 m^{2} (160,000 sq ft) to be subleased by the private sector. It is intended to receive a 5-star NABERS office energy rating and a 3-star NABERS office water rating. The building is the first new commercial office building developed for government in the Brisbane CBD since the completion of 33 Charlotte Street in 2004 for Queensland Health.

The theme and colour scheme for each floor has been dedicated to a Queensland icon or natural phenomenon.

Level	Themes
G to 2	base palette (neutral cream, brown and grey tones)
3 to 5	Barramundi
6 to 8	Moreton Bay fig
9 to 11	Saltwater Crocodile
12 to 14	Coloured Sands
16 to 18	Purple Fan Coral
19 to 21	Cassowary
22 to 24	Green Tree Frog
25 to 27	Pineapple
28 to 30	Orange Pore Fungi
31 to 33	Outback Sands
34 to 36	Sapphire
37 to 39	Sugar Cane
40 to 41	Water Dragon

== Construction ==
The construction, which was undertaken by Multiplex, commenced in early 2013 and was completed in 2016. The groundbreaking of the site, attended by Treasurer Tim Nicholls and Deputy Premier Jeff Seeney, was held on 4 March 2013.

From 1 October 2016, nine full departments and agencies, all state government ministers, most Directors-General and more than 5,000 public servants moved to 1 William Street. Some sections from 11 other departments also shifted to 1 William Street, while other sections of these departments moved to other buildings in the inner-city. Three buildings were demolished: the Executive Building at 100 George Street, the Executive Annex at 80 George Street and the Neville Bonner Building at 75 William Street. The demolition was completed in February 2018.

== Tenants ==
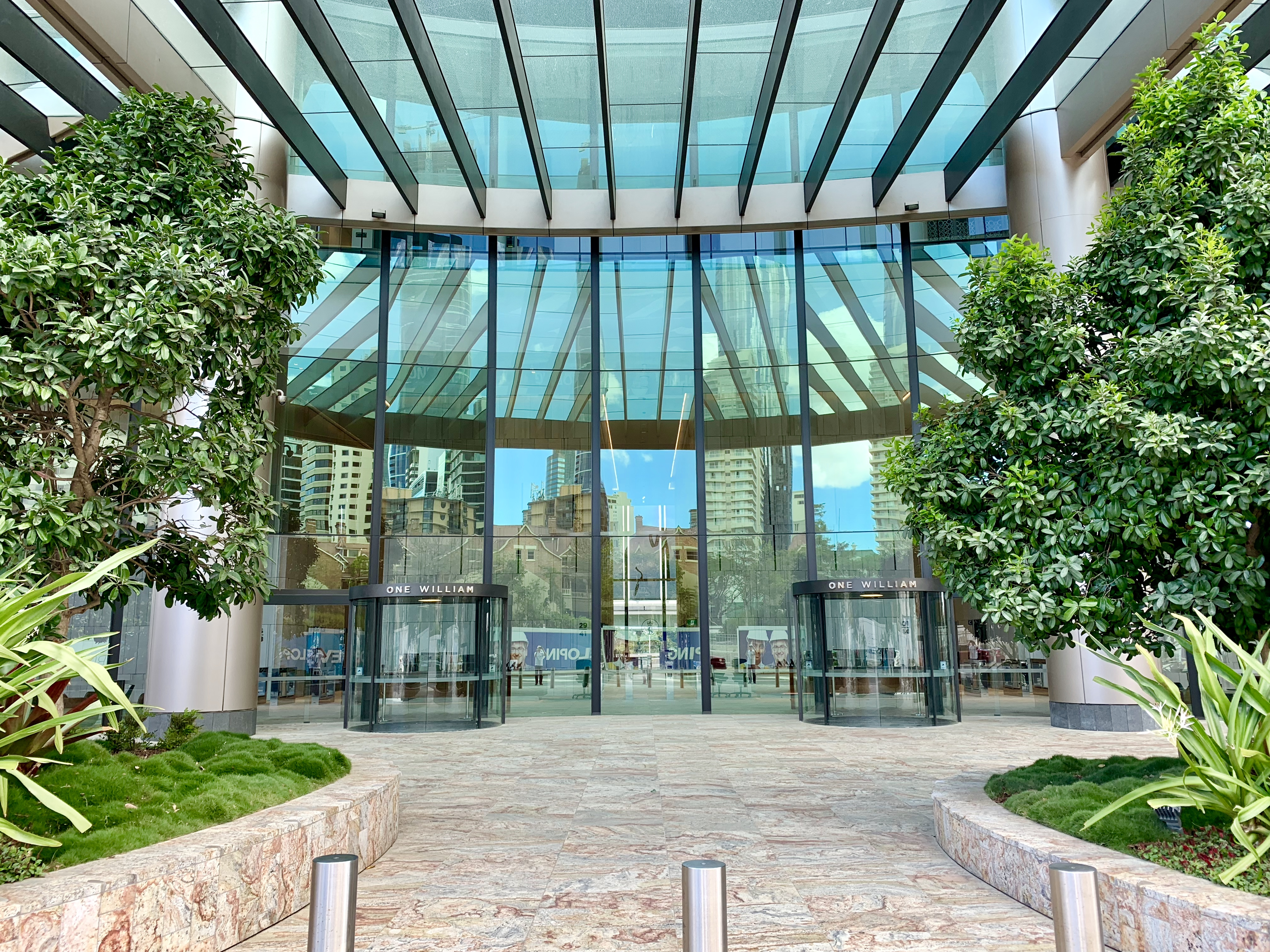
Entrance, 2018

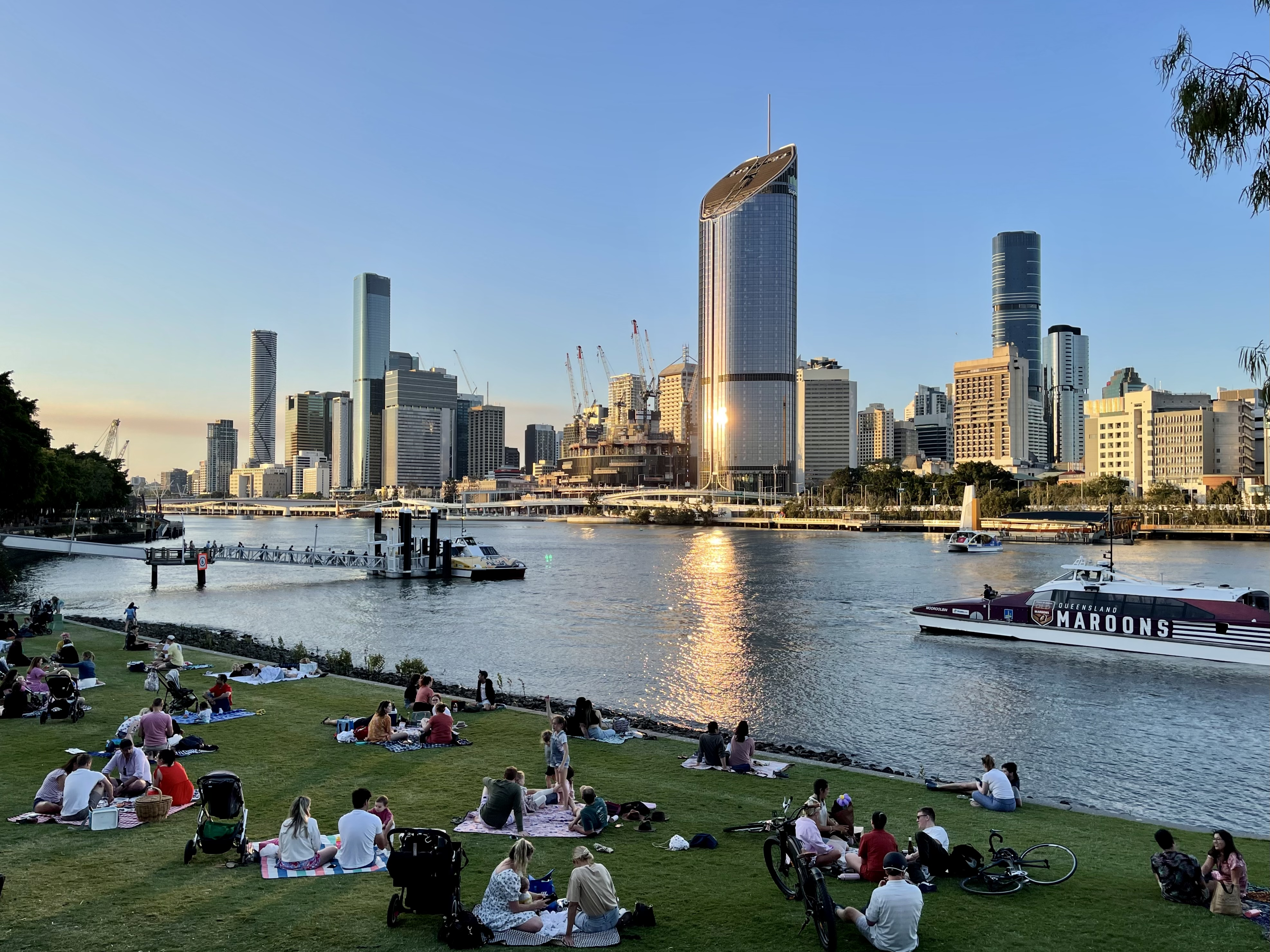
View from South Bank, 2021

The building houses between 5,000 and 6,000 public servants. The entirety of the 1 William Street building is occupied by various departments in the Queensland Government:

- Department of Customer Services, Open Data and Small and Family Business
- Department of Education
- Department of the Environment, Tourism, Science and Innovation
- Department of Families, Seniors, Disability Services and Child Safety
- Department of Housing and Public Works
- Department of Justice
- Department of Local Government, Water and Volunteers
- Department of Natural Resources and Mines, Manufacturing and Regional and Rural Development
- Department of the Premier and Cabinet
- Department of Primary Industries
- Queensland Corrective Services
- Queensland Fire Department
- Queensland Health (Department of Health)
- Queensland Police Service
- Queensland Treasury
- Department of Sport, Racing and Olympic and Paralympic Games
- Department of State Development, Infrastructure and Planning
- Department of Trade, Employment and Training
- Department of Transport and Main Roads
- Department of Women, Aboriginal and Torres Strait Islander Partnerships and Multiculturalism
- Department of Youth Justice and Victim Support

== See also ==
- List of tallest buildings in Brisbane
- List of tallest buildings in Australia
