= Premier of Queensland =

Head of government of Queensland

- Coat of arms of Queensland

- Flag of Queensland

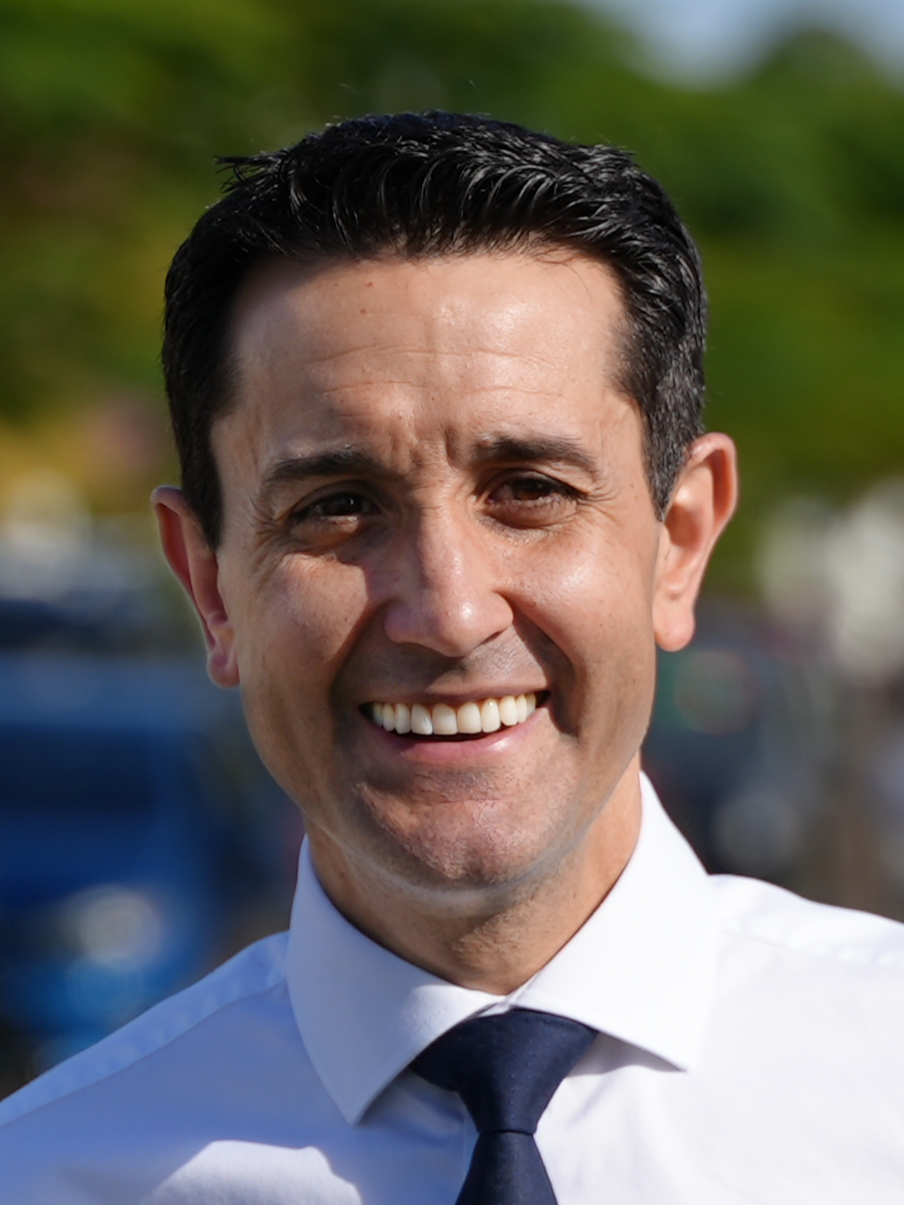
- Incumbent; David Crisafulli since 28 October 2024
- Department of the Premier and Cabinet
- Style: The Honourable (formal); Premier (informal)
- Status: Head of government
- Member of: Parliament; National Cabinet; Cabinet; Executive Council
- Reports to: Governor; Parliament
- Seat: 1 William Street, Brisbane
- Appointer: Governor of Queensland; by convention, based on appointee's ability to command confidence in the Legislative Assembly
- Term length: At the governor's pleasure; contingent on the premier's ability to command confidence in the house of Parliament
- Formation: 10 December 1859
- First holder: Robert Herbert
- Deputy: Deputy Premier of Queensland
- Salary: $469,367 (as of 1 September 2021) (Note: Commonly, the premier is usually the leader of their respective party. However, the salary of such position is not included. Thus, if one were to hold both positions simultaneously (Premier, Leader of Party), the total annual salary would be: AU$469,367. This also does not factor in other positions that can be held simultaneously to one or both of those: Ministerial positions, Member/Chair of Committee.)
- Website: www.thepremier.qld.gov.au

The premier of Queensland is the head of government in the Australian state of Queensland.

By convention, the premier is the leader of the party with a parliamentary majority in the Legislative Assembly of Queensland. The premier is appointed by the governor of Queensland.

The incumbent premier is David Crisafulli.

== Constitutional role ==
Under section 43 of the Constitution of Queensland the premier and other members of Cabinet are appointed by the governor. They are collectively responsible to Parliament in accordance with responsible government. The text of the Constitution assigns to the premier certain powers, such as the power to assign roles (s 25) to assistant ministers (formerly known as parliamentary secretaries), and to appoint ministers as acting ministers (s 45) for a period of 14 days.

In practice, under the conventions of the Westminster System followed in Queensland, the premier's power is derived from two sources: command of a majority in the Legislative Assembly, and the premier's role as chair of Cabinet, determining the appointment and roles of ministers. Although ministerial appointments are the prerogative of the governor of Queensland, in normal circumstances the governor will make these appointments on the advice of the premier.

Immediately following an election for the Legislative Assembly, the governor will call on the leader of the party which commands a majority in the Legislative Assembly to become premier and ask them to commission a government. A re-elected government will be resworn, with adjustments to the ministry as determined by the premier.

Prior to the existence of political parties within the Leglislative Assembly, to become premier, that member had to be able to command the support of a majority of the individual members of the assembly; this group of members were known informally as Ministerialists, while those who did not support the member who became premier were known informally as Oppositionists (or the Opposition).

== Premier's office ==
The premier has an office in the Executive Annexe of Parliament House, Brisbane, which is primarily utilised during sitting weeks. Their main office is located on the 40th floor of 1 William Street, a skyscraper adjacent to Parliament House. The office faces south-west, with floor-to-ceiling windows granting impressive views of Brisbane and its surrounds. The premier's office was formerly located on the 15th floor of the Executive Building, which was closed in 2016 and demolished in 2017 to make way for the Queen's Wharf development.

== List of premiers of Queensland ==
Before the 1890s, there was no developed party system in Queensland. Political affiliation labels before that time indicate a general tendency only. Before the end of the first decade of the twentieth century, political parties were more akin to parliamentary factions, and were fluid, informal and disorganised by modern standards.

No.	Portrait	Name	Election	Term of office			Political party	Constituency
No.	Portrait	Name	Election	Took office	Left office	Term in office	Political party	Constituency
1		Robert Herbert (1831–1905)	1860; 1863	10 December 1859	1 February 1866	6 years, 53 days	Squatter Conservative	Leichhardt
2		Arthur Macalister (1818–1883)	—	1 February 1866	20 July 1866	169 days	Independent	Town of Ipswich
(1)		Robert Herbert (1831–1905)	—	20 July 1866	7 August 1866	18 days	Squatter Conservative	West Moreton
(2)		Arthur Macalister (1818–1883)	—	7 August 1866	15 August 1867	1 year, 8 days	Independent	Town of Ipswich
3		Robert Mackenzie (1811–1873)	1867	15 August 1867	25 November 1868	1 year, 102 days	Squatter Conservative	Burnett
4		Charles Lilley (1827–1897)	1868	25 November 1868	2 May 1870	1 year, 158 days	Independent	Hamlet of Fortitude Valley
5		Arthur Hunter Palmer (1819–1898)	1870; 1871	3 May 1870	7 January 1874	3 years, 249 days	Squatter Conservative	Port Curtis
(2)		Arthur Macalister (1818–1883)	1873	8 January 1874	5 June 1876	2 years, 149 days	Independent	Ipswich
6		George Thorn (1838–1905)	—	5 June 1876	8 March 1877	276 days	Independent	Ipswich
7		John Douglas (1828–1904)	—	8 March 1877	21 January 1879	1 year, 227 days	Independent	Maryborough
8		Sir Thomas McIlwraith (1835–1900)	1878	21 January 1879	13 November 1883	4 years, 296 days	Conservative	Mulgrave
9		Sir Samuel Griffith (1845–1920)	1883	13 November 1883	13 June 1888	4 years, 213 days	Liberal	North Brisbane
(8)		Sir Thomas McIlwraith (1835–1900)	—	13 June 1888	30 November 1888	170 days	Conservative	Brisbane North
10		Boyd Dunlop Morehead (1843–1905)	1888	30 November 1888	12 August 1890	1 year, 255 days	Conservative	Balonne
(9)		Sir Samuel Griffith (1845–1920)	—	12 August 1890	27 March 1893	2 years, 227 days	Liberal	North Brisbane
(8)		Sir Thomas McIlwraith (1835–1900)	1893	27 March 1893	27 October 1893	214 days	Conservative	Brisbane North
11		Sir Hugh Nelson (1833–1906)	1896	27 October 1893	13 April 1898	4 years, 168 days	Ministerial	Murilla
12		Thomas Joseph Byrnes (1860–1898)	—	13 April 1898	27 September 1898 (†)	167 days	Ministerial	Warwick
13		James Dickson (1832–1901)	1899	1 October 1898	1 December 1899	1 year, 61 days	Ministerial	Bulimba
14		Anderson Dawson (1863–1910)	—	1 December 1899	7 December 1899	6 days	Labour	Charters Towers
15		Robert Philp (1851–1922)	1902	7 December 1899	17 September 1903	3 years, 284 days	Ministerial	Townsville
16		Arthur Morgan (1856–1916)	1904	17 September 1903	19 January 1906	2 years, 124 days	Liberal	Warwick
17		William Kidston (1849–1919)	1907	19 January 1906	19 November 1907	1 year, 304 days	Labor	Rockhampton
(17)		William Kidston (1849–1919)	1907	19 January 1906	19 November 1907	1 year, 304 days	Kidstonite	Rockhampton
(15)		Robert Philp (1851–1922)	—	19 November 1907	18 February 1908	91 days	Conservative	Townsville
(17)		William Kidston (1849–1919)	1908; 1909	18 February 1908	7 February 1911	2 years, 354 days	Kidston; Liberal	Rockhampton
18		Digby Denham (1859–1944)	1912	7 February 1911	1 June 1915	4 years, 114 days	Liberal	Oxley
19		T. J. Ryan (1876–1921)	1915; 1918	1 June 1915	22 October 1919	4 years, 143 days	Labor	Barcoo
20		Ted Theodore (1884–1950)	1920; 1923	22 October 1919	26 February 1925	5 years, 127 days	Labor	Chillagoe
21		William Gillies (1868–1928)	—	26 February 1925	22 October 1925	238 days	Labor	Eacham
22		William McCormack (1879–1947)	1926	22 October 1925	21 May 1929	3 years, 211 days	Labor	Cairns
23		Arthur Edward Moore (1876–1963)	1929	21 May 1929	17 June 1932	3 years, 27 days	CPNP	Aubigny
24		William Forgan Smith (1887–1953)	1932; 1935; 1938; 1941	17 June 1932	16 September 1942	10 years, 91 days	Labor	Mackay
25		Frank Arthur Cooper (1872–1949)	1944	16 September 1942	7 March 1946	3 years, 172 days	Labor	Bremer
26		Ned Hanlon (1887–1952)	1947; 1950	7 March 1946	15 January 1952 (†)	5 years, 314 days	Labor	Ithaca
27		Vince Gair (1901–1980)	1953; 1956	17 January 1952	12 August 1957	5 years, 207 days	Labor	South Brisbane
(27)		Vince Gair (1901–1980)	1953; 1956	17 January 1952	12 August 1957	5 years, 207 days	Queensland Labor	South Brisbane
28		Frank Nicklin (1895–1978)	1957; 1960; 1963; 1966	12 August 1957	17 January 1968	10 years, 158 days	Country	Landsborough
29		Jack Pizzey (1911–1968)	—	17 January 1968	31 July 1968 (†)	196 days	Country	Isis
30		Gordon Chalk (1913–1991)	—	1 August 1968	8 August 1968	7 days	Liberal	Lockyer
31		Sir Joh Bjelke-Petersen (knighted in 1984) (1911–2005)	1969; 1972; 1974; 1977; 1980; 1983; 1986	8 August 1968	1 December 1987	19 years, 115 days	Country/National	Barambah
32		Mike Ahern (1942–2023)	—	1 December 1987	25 September 1989	1 year, 298 days	National	Landsborough
33		Russell Cooper (born 1941)	—	25 September 1989	7 December 1989	73 days	National	Roma
34		Wayne Goss (1951–2014)	1989; 1992; 1995	7 December 1989	19 February 1996	6 years, 74 days	Labor	Logan
35		Rob Borbidge (born 1954)	—	19 February 1996	20 June 1998	2 years, 121 days	National	Surfers Paradise
36		Peter Beattie (born 1952)	1998; 2001; 2004; 2006	20 June 1998	13 September 2007	9 years, 85 days	Labor	Brisbane Central
37		Anna Bligh (born 1960)	2009	13 September 2007	26 March 2012	4 years, 195 days	Labor	South Brisbane
38		Campbell Newman (born 1963)	2012	26 March 2012	14 February 2015	2 years, 325 days	Liberal National	Ashgrove
39		Annastacia Palaszczuk (born 1969)	2015; 2017; 2020	14 February 2015	15 December 2023	8 years, 304 days	Labor	Inala
40		Steven Miles (born 1977)	—	15 December 2023	28 October 2024	318 days	Labor	Murrumba
41		David Crisafulli (born 1979)	2024	28 October 2024	Incumbent	2 years, 19 days	Liberal National	Broadwater

== See also ==
- List of premiers of Queensland by time in office
- Government of Queensland
- Politics of Queensland
