= Department of State Development, Infrastructure and Planning =

Queensland state government department

Department overview
- Jurisdiction: Queensland Government
- Headquarters: 1 William Street, Brisbane
- Minister responsible: Jarrod Bleijie, Minister for State Development, Infrastructure and Planning; Minister for Industrial Relations
- Department executives: John Sosso, Director-General; Gerard Coggan, Coordinator-General
- Website: statedevelopment.qld.gov.au; planning.qld.gov.au

The Department of State Development, Infrastructure and Planning is the ministerial department of the Queensland Government responsible for economic strategy, industry stimulation, and infrastructure, local government and planning in Queensland. The department is led by the Deputy Premier, Minister for State Development, Infrastructure and Planning and Minister for Industrial Relations, currently, the Honourable Jarrod Bleijie MP It is headquartered at 1 William Street, Brisbane.

The department was previously called the Department of State Development, Infrastructure, Local Government and Planning, and the Department of State Development, Tourism and Innovation. It was renamed from the former in November 2024 during machinery of government changes after the 2024 Queensland state election.
