= Trevor Coomber =

Australian politician

Member of the Queensland Legislative Assembly for Currumbin
- In office 2 December 1989 – 19 September 1992
- Preceded by: Leo Gately
- Succeeded by: Merri Rose

Personal details
- Born: Trevor McDougall Coomber; 13 June 1949 (age 76) Charleville, Queensland, Australia
- Party: Liberal Party
- Spouse: Kathryn Coomber
- Occupation: Pharmacist

Trevor McDougall Coomber (born 13 June 1949) is a former Australian politician.

He was born in Charleville to schoolteacher Laurence Edward Coomber and Sybil Harding, née Lightbody, a secretary. He was educated at public schools in Pelican, Lowmead and Rosedale and at high schools in Bundaberg and Mount Gravatt. In 1970 he graduated from the University of Queensland with a Bachelor of Pharmacy, and began work as a pharmacist in Brisbane. On 8 April 1972 he married Roberta Anne Richardson, also a pharmacist; they had four children before their separation. Coomber moved to the Gold Coast in 1973 and to Palm Beach in 1974, where he was a member of the Beach Protection Authority of Queensland and patron of several community groups.

A member of the Liberal Party since 1974, he resigned from the party in 1981 over retrospective taxation. In 1982 he was elected to Gold Coast City Council as a National, although he resigned from the party in 1986 after land development pressures on the Gold Coast led to a disagreement. During his tenure as an Alderman, he met and later married Kathryn Smith, a personal assistant. After an unsuccessful run for the state seat of Currumbin as an independent in 1986, he was elected to the Queensland Legislative Assembly in 1989 as a Liberal. In 1992 he challenged National Party leader Rob Borbidge in Surfers Paradise, but was defeated.

After leaving politics, he returned to community pharmacy, operating several pharmacies under the Terry White brand. His association with Terry White strengthened, to include holding a position on the group's Board. In 2018, Coomber's operating company entered administration and was eventually wound up by liquidators in 2019 with unsupported liabilities in the order of AU$19 million.

Parliament of Queensland
Preceded by Leo Gately	Member for Currumbin; 1989–1992	Succeeded by Merri Rose
