= Leo Gately =

Australian politician (1937–2021)

Member of the Queensland Legislative Assembly for Currumbin
- In office 1 November 1986 – 2 December 1989
- Preceded by: New seat
- Succeeded by: Trevor Coomber

Personal details
- Born: Leo Francis Gately; 15 June 1937 West Wyalong, New South Wales, Australia
- Died: 25 August 2021 (aged 84) Rockhampton, Queensland
- Party: National Party
- Spouse: Helen Gallagher (m.1960)
- Occupation: Businessman

Leo Francis Gately (15 June 1937 – 25 August 2021) was an Australian politician.

He was born at West Wyalong to Patrick Leo Joseph Gately and his wife Eleanor Agnes, née Barton. On 3 September 1960, he married Helen Gallagher, with whom he had four children. From 1971 to 1973, he sat on Newcastle City Council and served as a member of the New South Wales Police Force, before moving to Queensland, where he became involved with the National Party. He served one term (1986–89) as the member for Currumbin in the Queensland Legislative Assembly before being defeated at the 1989 state election by the Liberal candidate, Trevor Coomber.

Parliament of Queensland
Preceded by New seat	Member for Currumbin; 1986–1989	Succeeded by Trevor Coomber
