= Queensland Government =

Australian state executive government

- State government
- Logo used since 2012

Overview
- Established: 10 December 1859; 166 years ago as a colonial government; 1 January 1901; 125 years ago as an Australian state
- State: Queensland
- Country: Australia
- Leader: Premier (David Crisafulli)
- Appointed by: Governor (Jeannette Young) on the advice of the premier
- Main organ: Cabinet
- Ministries: 22 government departments
- Responsible to: Legislative Assembly of Queensland
- Annual budget: ▲$87.6 billion (2023–24)
- Headquarters: 1 William Street, Brisbane
- Website: qld.gov.au

The Queensland Government is the executive government of the state of Queensland, Australia. Government is formed by the party or coalition that commands a majority in the Legislative Assembly, with the governor officially appointing office-holders. The first government was formed in 1859 when Queensland separated from New South Wales under the state constitution. Since federation in 1901, Queensland has been a state of Australia, with the Constitution of Australia regulating its relationship with the Commonwealth. Like its federal counterpart, the Queensland Government takes the form of a parliamentary constitutional monarchy.

Queensland's system of government is influenced by the Westminster system and Australia's federal system of government. Executive acts are given legal force through the actions of the governor of Queensland (the representative of the monarch, Charles III), although the governor in practice performs only ceremonial duties, with de facto executive power lying with the Cabinet. The Cabinet is the government's chief policy-making organ which consists of the premier and senior ministers. Each minister is responsible for exercising policy and legislation through the respective state government department.

The headquarters for each government department are located in the capital city of Brisbane, with most departments based at 1 William Street, a purpose-built skyscraper in the Brisbane central business district.

== Executive power ==
Queensland is governed according to the principles of the Westminster system, a form of parliamentary government based on the model of the United Kingdom. Legislative power rests with the Parliament of Queensland, which consists of the King, represented by the Governor of Queensland, and the one house, the Legislative Assembly of Queensland. De jure executive power rests formally with the Executive Council, which consists of the Governor and senior minister, but is exercised de facto by the state cabinet.

The Governor, as representative of the Crown, is the formal repository of power, which is exercised by him or her on the advice of the Premier of Queensland and the Cabinet. The Premier and Ministers are appointed by the Governor, and hold office by virtue of their ability to command the support of a majority of members of the Legislative Assembly.

== Current Ministry ==
On 27 October 2024, Crisafulli announced that he and Deputy Premier Jarrod Bleijie would be sworn in as an interim two-person cabinet, however which portfolios will be assigned to each of them is unknown. Crisafulli and Bleijie were formally sworn in by Governor Jeanette Young on 28 October. On 1 November 2024, the full ministry was formally sworn in, as follows:

Portrait	Minister	Portfolio	Took office	Left office	Duration of tenure	Party	Electorate
Cabinet Ministers
	David Crisafulli	Premier; Minister for Veterans	28 October 2024	Incumbent	2 years, 25 days	Liberal National	Broadwater
	Jarrod Bleijie	Deputy Premier; Minister for State Development and Infrastructure; Minister for Industrial Relations	28 October 2024	Incumbent	2 years, 25 days	Liberal National	Kawana
	David Janetzki	Treasurer; Minister for Energy; Minister for Homes	1 November 2024	Incumbent	2 years, 21 days	Liberal National	Toowoomba South
	Ros Bates	Minister for Finance and Trade; Minister for Employment and Training	1 November 2024	Incumbent	2 years, 21 days	Liberal National	Mudgeeraba
	Tim Nicholls	Minister for Health and Ambulance Services	1 November 2024	Incumbent	2 years, 21 days	Liberal National	Clayfield
	Deb Frecklington	Attorney-General; Minister for Justice; Minister for Integrity	1 November 2024	Incumbent	2 years, 21 days	Liberal National	Nanango
	Dale Last	Minister for Natural Resources and Mines; Minister for Manufacturing; Minister for Rural and Regional Development	1 November 2024	Incumbent	2 years, 21 days	Liberal National	Burdekin
	John-Paul Langbroek	Minister for Education; Minister for the Arts	1 November 2024	Incumbent	2 years, 21 days	Liberal National	Surfers Paradise
	Dan Purdie	Minister for Police and Community Safety	1 November 2024	Incumbent	2 years, 21 days	Liberal National	Ninderry
	Laura Gerber	Minister for Youth Justice and Victim Support; Minister for Corrective Services	1 November 2024	Incumbent	2 years, 21 days	Liberal National	Currumbin
	Brent Mickelberg	Minister for Transport and Main Roads	1 November 2024	Incumbent	2 years, 21 days	Liberal National	Buderim
	Ann Leahy	Minister for Local Government; Minister for Water; Minister for Fire and Emergency Services; Minister for Disaster Recovery; Minister for Volunteers	1 November 2024	Incumbent	2 years, 21 days	Liberal National	Warrego
	Sam O'Connor	Minister for Housing and Public Works; Minister for Youth	1 November 2024	Incumbent	2 years, 21 days	Liberal National	Bonney
	Tony Perrett	Minister for Primary Industries	1 November 2024	Incumbent	2 years, 21 days	Liberal National	Gympie
	Fiona Simpson	Minister for Women; Minister for Women's Economic Security; Minister for Aboriginal and Torres Strait Islander Partnerships and Multiculturalism	1 November 2024	Incumbent	2 years, 21 days	Liberal National	Maroochydore
	Andrew Powell	Minister for the Environment; Minister for Tourism; Minister for Science and Innovation	1 November 2024	Incumbent	2 years, 21 days	Liberal National	Glass House
	Amanda Camm	Minister for Families, Seniors and Disabilities; Minister for Child Safety; Minister for the Prevention of Domestic and Family Violence	1 November 2024	Incumbent	2 years, 21 days	Liberal National	Whitsunday
	Tim Mander	Minister for Sport and Racing; Minister for the Olympic and Paralympic Games	1 November 2024	Incumbent	2 years, 21 days	Liberal National	Everton
	Steve Minnikin	Minister for Customer Service; Minister for Open Data	1 November 2024	Incumbent	2 years, 21 days	Liberal National	Chatsworth
	Christian Rowan	Leader of the House	1 November 2024	Incumbent	2 years, 21 days	Liberal National	Moggill

== Queensland Government departments ==
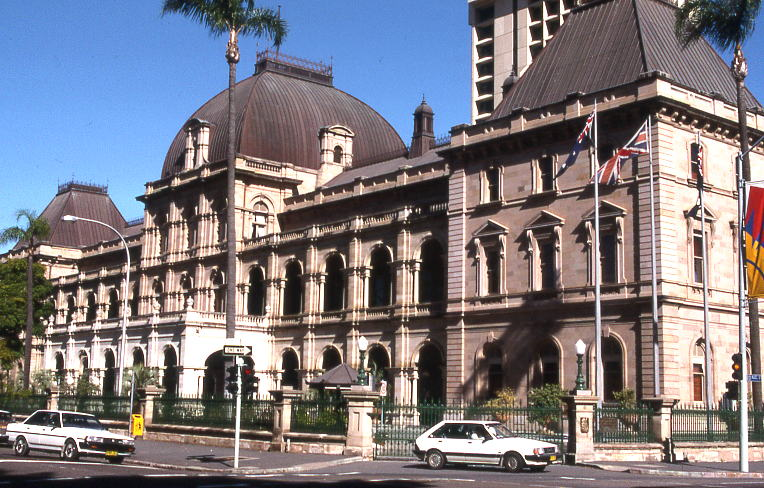
Parliament House in Brisbane

The state government head office at 1 William Street

In November 2024, the newly elected Crisafulli ministry introduced machinery of government changes to dissolve the former Department of Energy and Climate and restructure the remaining departments. The state government departments are now:

- Department of Customer Services, Open Data and Small and Family Business
- Department of Education
- Department of the Environment, Tourism, Science and Innovation
- Department of Families, Seniors, Disability Services and Child Safety
- Department of Housing and Public Works
- Department of Justice
- Department of Local Government, Water and Volunteers
- Department of Natural Resources and Mines, Manufacturing and Regional and Rural Development
- Department of the Premier and Cabinet
- Department of Primary Industries
- Queensland Corrective Services
- Queensland Fire Department
- Queensland Health (Department of Health)
- Queensland Police Service
- Queensland Treasury
- Department of Sport, Racing and Olympic and Paralympic Games
- Department of State Development, Infrastructure and Planning
- Department of Trade, Employment and Training
- Department of Transport and Main Roads
- Department of Women, Aboriginal and Torres Strait Islander Partnerships and Multiculturalism
- Department of Youth Justice and Victim Support

A range of other agencies support the functions of these departments.

== See also ==
- Politics of Queensland
- Crime and Corruption Commission
- Women in the Queensland Legislative Assembly
