= Jann Stuckey =

Australian politician

Minister for Tourism, Major Events, Small Business and Commonwealth Games of Queensland
- In office 3 April 2012 – 14 February 2015
- Premier: Campbell Newman
- Preceded by: Jan Jarratt (Tourism and Small Business); Anna Bligh (Events and Games)
- Succeeded by: Kate Jones

Member of the Queensland Parliament for Currumbin
- In office 7 February 2004 – 1 February 2020
- Preceded by: Merri Rose
- Succeeded by: Laura Gerber

Personal details
- Born: 21 January 1955 (age 71) Adelaide, South Australia
- Party: Independent
- Other political affiliations: Liberal Party (2004–2008); Liberal National Party (2008–2020)
- Spouse: Richard Stuckey
- Children: 2

Janet Anne Stuckey (born 21 January 1955) is an Australian politician who represented the electorate of Currumbin in the Legislative Assembly of Queensland from 2004 to 2020.

She was first elected on 7 February 2004 as a member of the Liberal Party. She joined the newly formed Liberal National Party of Queensland in 2008 when the Liberal Party and the Nationals merged in Queensland. Before the 2012 election, she was the Shadow Minister for Tourism, Small Business and Manufacturing.

She was the Shadow Minister for Small Business, Job Creation, Fair Trading and Industrial Relations and the Shadow Minister for Women. She was the Shadow Minister for Public Works and Information and Communication Technology between 2010 and 2011.

Before defeating government minister Merri Rose at the 2004 state election, Stuckey ran a communications business.

== Early life ==
Stuckey was born and raised in Adelaide, South Australia. In 1976, Stuckey became a registered nurse with a diploma from Adelaide Children's Hospital. In 1987, Stuckey moved with her family to Currumbin on the Gold Coast in 1987. Prior to her election in 2004, Stuckey ran a communications consultancy firm specialising in professional development, speaker coaching and conflict resolution.

== Political career ==
Stuckey first ran for the state seat of Currumbin in 2001 for the Liberal Party, losing to incumbent Labor member Merri Rose.

=== Election to Queensland Parliament ===
In 2004, Stuckey ran for Currumbin again for the Liberal Party, succeeding in unseating Rose with a 17.7-point swing following a number of scandals surrounding Rose's electorate office expenses and staff bullying accusations. Stuckey was the only seat that the opposition managed to win from Labor. Upon her election, Stuckey was appointed Liberal Party spokesperson for Tourism, Fair Trading and Wine Industry Development, Child Safety, Communities and Disability Services, Employment, Training and Industrial Relations, and Women's Issues. After the National and Liberal Parties formed a coalition in September 2005, Stuckey was promoted to the Shadow Cabinet as Shadow Minister for Tourism, Fair Trading and Wine Industry Development.

During the 2006 campaign, local high school teacher Michael Riordan challenged Stuckey as the Labor candidate for Currumbin. She was re-elected with 52% of the vote after preferences. After the 2006 election, Stuckey returned to the Shadow Cabinet as Shadow Minister for Child Safety, Disability Services and Mental Health.

At the 2009 election, she was returned again with a 5.9-point swing to the newly amalgamated Liberal National Party of Queensland and was appointed by new leader John-Paul Langbroek as Shadow Minister for Public Works and ICT. After Campbell Newman was elected leader of the LNP in 2011, she was appointed as Shadow Minister for Tourism, Manufacturing and Small Business a position she took through until the 2012 election.

=== Newman ministry ===
In April 2012, Premier Campbell Newman nominated Jann Stuckey to the Governor of Queensland for the cabinet position of Minister for Tourism, Major Events, Small Business and Commonwealth Games and was sworn in on 3 April 2012 at Government House, Brisbane.

=== Resignation ===
In January 2020, Stuckey announced that she would resign from parliament at the start of February, citing an ongoing battle with depression, having previously said she would not re-contest her seat at the next election.

== Personal life ==
Her husband Richard Stuckey ran as an independent for Currumbin at the 2020 election and finished 4th behind new incumbent Laura Gerber.

Political offices
Preceded by Jan Jarratt as Minister for Tourism, Manufacturing and Small Business	Minister for Tourism, Major Events, Small Business and Commonwealth Games; 2012–2015	Succeeded by Kate Jones
Preceded by Anna Bligh as Minister for Events and Games	Minister for Tourism, Major Events, Small Business and Commonwealth Games; 2012–2015	Succeeded by Kate Jones
Parliament of Queensland
Preceded by Merri Rose	Member for Currumbin; 2004–2020	Succeeded by Laura Gerber
