= Department of the Premier and Cabinet (Queensland) =

State government department in Queensland, Australia

Department overview
- Jurisdiction: Queensland
- Headquarters: 1 William Street, Brisbane
- Minister responsible: David Crisafulli, Premier
- Department executive: Damien Walker, Director-General
- Website: premiers.qld.gov.au

The Department of the Premier and Cabinet is a department of the Queensland Government. It is responsible for advising and supporting the Premier and Cabinet, and for managing the state's public sector alongside the Public Service Commission.

The department's headquarters are at 1 William Street in the Brisbane CBD.

== Structure ==
The department reports to the Premier and is administered by its Director-General, Dave Stewart. The department has five divisions:

- Strategy and Engagement
- Policy Division
- Corporate Government Services
- Cabinet Services
- Office of the Queensland Parliamentary Counsel

== Publications ==
The department's annual reports from 2012/2013 to present are available.

== See also ==
- Premiers of the Australian states

== Past Director-Generals ==
Past Director-Generals include:

- October 2024 (Acting) – December 2024: David Mackie
- 18 December 2023 – November 2024: Mike Kaiser
- April 2021 – 15 December 2023: Rachel Hunter
- February 2015 – April 2021: Dave Stewart

A list of the heads of the Department from 1859 to 2001 is available.
