= Laura Gerber =

Australian politician (born 1984)

The Honourable Laura Gerber MP
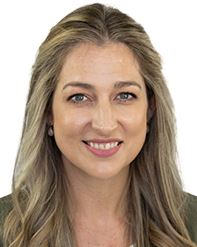

Member of the Queensland Legislative Assembly for Currumbin
- Incumbent
- Assumed office 28 March 2020
- Preceded by: Jann Stuckey

Personal details
- Born: Laura Jane Gerber; 29 November 1984 (age 41) Southport, Queensland, Australia
- Party: Liberal National Party
- Profession: Prosecutor

Laura Jane Gerber (born 29 November 1984) is an Australian politician who has represented Currumbin in the Queensland Legislative Assembly since 2020 as a member of the Liberal National Party.

== Early life ==
Gerber grew up in the suburb of Terranora. Prior to her political career, Gerber was a Commonwealth prosecutor. She spent a period at the Redfern Legal Centre.

In 2003, Gerber appeared as a contestant on Australia's Worst Driver.

== Politics ==
The seat of Currumbin became vacant due to the resignation of Jann Stuckey. Gerber was announced as the Liberal National Party candidate for Currumbin on 28 January 2020 by Leader of the Opposition Deb Frecklington. Gerber won the seat in the 2020 Currumbin state by-election.
