= Electoral district of Currumbin =

State electoral district of Queensland, Australia

Currumbin Queensland—Legislative Assembly
- Electoral map of Currumbin 2017
- State: Queensland
- MP: Laura Gerber
- Party: Liberal National
- Namesake: Currumbin
- Electors: 36,059 (2020)
- Area: 137 km^{2} (52.9 sq mi)
- Demographic: Outer-metropolitan
- Coordinates: 28°10′S 153°25′E
Electorates around Currumbin:
Mudgeeraba	Mudgeeraba	Burleigh
Mudgeeraba	Currumbin	Coral Sea
New South Wales	New South Wales	New South Wales

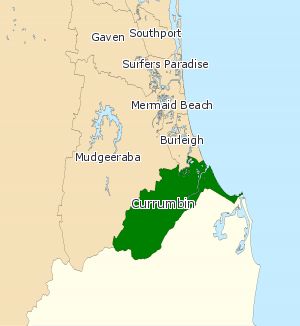
Electoral map of Currumbin 2008

Currumbin is an electoral district of the Legislative Assembly in the Australian state of Queensland.

The district lies in the south-east corner of the state, along the New South Wales border. The district takes in southern parts of the Gold Coast and much of its hinterland. It includes the suburbs of Currumbin, Coolangatta, Elanora and Tugun as well as the rural Currumbin Valley and Tallebudgera Valley. The electorate was first contested in 1986.

== Members for Currumbin ==
Member	Party	Term
Leo Gately	National	1986–1989
Trevor Coomber	Liberal	1989–1992
Merri Rose	Labor	1992–2004
Jann Stuckey	Liberal	2004–2008
Jann Stuckey	Liberal National	2008–2020
Laura Gerber	Liberal National	2020–present

== Election results ==
2024 Queensland state election: Currumbin
Party	Candidate	Votes	%	±%
Liberal National	Laura Gerber	14,328	47.86	+7.62
Labor	Nathan Fleury	7,164	23.93	−10.79
Independent	Kath Down	2,939	9.82	+9.82
Greens	Braden Smith	2,854	9.53	−0.34
One Nation	Angela Gunson	1,598	5.34	+1.33
Animal Justice	Jennifer Horsburgh	696	2.32	+2.32
Family First	David Totenhofer	359	1.20	+1.20
Total formal votes		29,938	94.03	−1.31
Informal votes		1,902	5.97	+1.31
Turnout		31,840	84.38	−2.06
Two-party-preferred result
Liberal National	Laura Gerber	18,657	62.32	+11.80
Labor	Nathan Fleury	11,281	37.68	−11.80
Liberal National hold		Swing	+11.80	

Primary vote results in Currumbin (Parties with less than 5% of the vote are omitted)
Liberal National

Liberal
National

Labor
Greens
One Nation
Palmer United/United Australia Party
Katter's Australian
Independent
View source data.
Two-party-preferred vote vote results in Currumbin View source data.
