= Electoral results for the district of Ashgrove =

Queensland, Australia, district election results

This is a list of electoral results for the electoral district of Ashgrove in Queensland state elections.

== Members for Ashgrove ==
Member	Party	Term
Douglas Tooth	Liberal	1960–1974
John Greenwood	Liberal	1974–1983
Tom Veivers	Labor	1983–1986
Alan Sherlock	Liberal	1986–1989
Jim Fouras	Labor	1989–2006
Kate Jones	Labor	2006–2012
Campbell Newman	Liberal National	2012–2015
Kate Jones	Labor	2015–2017

== Election results ==
=== Elections in the 2010s ===
2015 Queensland state election: Ashgrove
Party	Candidate	Votes	%	±%
Labor	Kate Jones	13,372	44.45	+7.85
Liberal National	Campbell Newman	13,125	43.63	−8.18
Greens	Robert Hogg	3,047	10.13	+0.96
Independent	Connie Cicchini	279	0.93	+0.93
Independent	Peter Jeremijenko	261	0.87	+0.87
Total formal votes		30,084	98.97	−0.25
Informal votes		313	1.03	+0.25
Turnout		30,397	91.34	−1.06
Two-party-preferred result
Labor	Kate Jones	16,009	54.25	+9.95
Liberal National	Campbell Newman	13,498	45.75	−9.95
Labor gain from Liberal National		Swing	+9.95	

2012 Queensland state election: Ashgrove
Party	Candidate	Votes	%	±%
Liberal National	Campbell Newman	14,932	51.81	+14.55
Labor	Kate Jones	10,549	36.60	−9.11
Greens	Sandra Bayley	2,644	9.17	−3.23
Katter's Australian	Norman Wicks	478	1.66	+1.66
Independent	Trevor Jones	156	0.54	+0.54
One Nation	Ian Nelson	64	0.22	+0.22
Total formal votes		28,823	99.22	+0.43
Informal votes		227	0.78	−0.43
Turnout		29,050	92.40	+0.73
Two-party-preferred result
Liberal National	Campbell Newman	15,537	55.70	+12.80
Labor	Kate Jones	12,358	44.30	−12.80
Liberal National gain from Labor		Swing	+12.80	

=== Elections in the 2000s ===
2009 Queensland state election: Ashgrove
Party	Candidate	Votes	%	±%
Labor	Kate Jones	12,629	45.7	−1.9
Liberal National	Scott McConnel	10,293	37.3	+1.4
Greens	Robert Hogg	3,425	12.4	−3.4
Independent	Ian Saunders	799	2.9	+2.9
DS4SEQ	Bill Grieve	355	1.3	+1.3
Independent	Ruth Spencer	127	0.5	+0.5
Total formal votes		27,628	98.7	+0.3
Informal votes		339	1.3	−0.3
Turnout		27,967	91.6	
Two-party-preferred result
Labor	Kate Jones	14,842	57.1	−1.4
Liberal National	Scott McConnel	11,153	42.9	+1.4
Labor hold		Swing	−1.4	

2006 Queensland state election: Ashgrove
Party	Candidate	Votes	%	±%
Labor	Kate Jones	11,523	47.6	−5.7
Liberal	Glenn Kiddle	8,836	36.5	+5.8
Greens	Dean Love	3,835	15.9	−0.1
Total formal votes		24,194	98.4	+0.3
Informal votes		381	1.6	−0.3
Turnout		24,575	90.9	−0.6
Two-party-preferred result
Labor	Kate Jones	13,299	58.1	−6.6
Liberal	Glenn Kiddle	9,599	41.9	+6.6
Labor hold		Swing	−6.6	

2004 Queensland state election: Ashgrove
Party	Candidate	Votes	%	±%
Labor	Jim Fouras	13,093	53.3	−2.2
Liberal	Terry Mendies	7,534	30.7	+1.1
Greens	Mike Stasse	3,942	16.0	+10.1
Total formal votes		24,569	98.1	−0.3
Informal votes		483	1.9	+0.3
Turnout		25,052	91.5	
Two-party-preferred result
Labor	Jim Fouras	15,049	64.7	−0.3
Liberal	Terry Mendies	8,215	35.3	+0.3
Labor hold		Swing	−0.3	

2001 Queensland state election: Ashgrove
Party	Candidate	Votes	%	±%
Labor	Jim Fouras	13,630	55.5	+6.5
Liberal	Bryan Cook	7,263	29.6	−6.4
Greens	Mark Carey-Smith	1,459	5.9	+1.9
Democrats	Brett Matthews	1,300	5.3	+1.8
Independent	Allen Anderson	923	3.8	+3.8
Total formal votes		24,575	98.4	−0.3
Informal votes		414	1.6	+0.3
Turnout		24,989	92.6	
Two-party-preferred result
Labor	Jim Fouras	15,068	65.0	+7.6
Liberal	Bryan Cook	8,102	35.0	−7.6
Labor hold		Swing	+7.6	

=== Elections in the 1990s ===
1998 Queensland state election: Ashgrove
Party	Candidate	Votes	%	±%
Labor	Jim Fouras	9,688	48.4	+3.9
Liberal	Alan Sherlock	7,650	38.2	−5.1
Australia First	Ray Sargent	1,044	5.2	+3.9
Greens	Brenda Mason	1,028	5.1	+5.1
Democrats	Justin Yeend	593	3.0	−4.7
Total formal votes		20,003	98.7	+0.2
Informal votes		269	1.3	−0.2
Turnout		20,272	92.8	
Two-party-preferred result
Labor	Jim Fouras	10,873	56.1	+4.8
Liberal	Alan Sherlock	8,509	43.9	−4.8
Labor hold		Swing	+4.8	

1995 Queensland state election: Ashgrove
Party	Candidate	Votes	%	±%
Labor	Jim Fouras	8,567	44.5	−11.0
Liberal	Peter Rowell	8,347	43.4	+13.7
Democrats	Leo Talty	1,483	7.7	+7.7
Independent	Roger Brand	607	3.2	+3.2
Independent	Ray Sargent	250	1.3	−2.5
Total formal votes		19,254	98.5	+0.1
Informal votes		301	1.5	−0.1
Turnout		19,555	92.4	
Two-party-preferred result
Labor	Jim Fouras	9,647	51.3	−8.0
Liberal	Peter Rowell	9,149	48.7	+8.0
Labor hold		Swing	−8.0	

1992 Queensland state election: Ashgrove
Party	Candidate	Votes	%	±%
Labor	Jim Fouras	11,024	55.5	+2.0
Liberal	Tony Dempsey	5,887	29.6	−6.1
National	Marie McCullagh	2,204	11.1	+3.7
Independent	Ray Sargent	752	3.8	+3.8
Total formal votes		19,867	98.3	
Informal votes		335	1.7	
Turnout		20,202	91.5	
Two-party-preferred result
Labor	Jim Fouras	11,536	59.3	+3.8
Liberal	Tony Dempsey	7,923	40.7	−3.8
Labor hold		Swing	+3.8	

=== Elections in the 1980s ===
1989 Queensland state election: Ashgrove
Party	Candidate	Votes	%	±%
Labor	Jim Fouras	10,007	54.3	+9.6
Liberal	Alan Sherlock	6,296	34.2	+7.7
National	John Giles	1,263	6.9	−19.3
Independent	Stephen Woolcock	591	3.2	+3.2
Independent	Garry Renshaw	278	1.5	+1.5
Total formal votes		18,435	97.7	
Informal votes		441	2.3	
Turnout		18,876	91.4	
Two-party-preferred result
Labor	Jim Fouras	10,434	56.6	+8.6
Liberal	Alan Sherlock	8,001	43.4	−8.6
Labor gain from Liberal		Swing	+8.6	

1986 Queensland state election: Ashgrove
Party	Candidate	Votes	%	±%
Labor	Tom Veivers	7,613	44.7	+2.3
Liberal	Alan Sherlock	4,511	26.5	+6.9
National	Francis Gaffy	4,453	26.2	−2.2
Democrats	Paul Wright	448	2.6	−7.0
Total formal votes		17,025	98.5	
Informal votes		258	1.5	
Turnout		17,283	91.2	
Two-party-preferred result
Liberal	Alan Sherlock	8,860	52.0	+3.6
Labor	Tom Veivers	8,165	48.0	−3.6
Liberal gain from Labor		Swing	+3.6	

1983 Queensland state election: Ashgrove
Party	Candidate	Votes	%	±%
Labor	Tom Veivers	7,414	42.4	+1.9
National	C.S. Appleby	4,963	28.4	+28.4
Liberal	John Greenwood	3,425	19.6	−24.1
Democrats	M.P. West	1,676	9.6	−2.9
Total formal votes		17,478	99.0	
Informal votes		172	1.0	
Turnout		17,650	92.3	
Two-party-preferred result
Labor	Tom Veivers	9,019	51.6	+2.0
National	C.S. Appleby	8,459	48.4	+48.4
Labor gain from Liberal		Swing	+2.0	

1980 Queensland state election: Ashgrove
Party	Candidate	Votes	%	±%
Liberal	John Greenwood	6,883	43.7	−7.1
Labor	Patrick Comben	6,378	40.5	−2.9
Democrats	Cheryl Paton	1,967	12.5	+12.5
Progress	Owen Pershouse	510	3.2	−2.7
Total formal votes		15,738	98.7	−0.3
Informal votes		209	1.3	+0.3
Turnout		15,947	89.7	−2.5
Two-party-preferred result
Liberal	John Greenwood	7,927	50.4	−4.5
Labor	Patrick Comben	7,811	49.6	+4.5
Liberal hold		Swing	−4.5	

=== Elections in the 1970s ===
1977 Queensland state election: Ashgrove
Party	Candidate	Votes	%	±%
Liberal	John Greenwood	7,468	50.8	+6.7
Labor	Pat Comben	6,375	43.4	+12.5
Progress	Gary Sturgess	862	5.9	+5.9
Total formal votes		14,706	99.0	
Informal votes		151	1.0	
Turnout		14,857	92.2	
Two-party-preferred result
Liberal	John Greenwood	8,071	54.9	−11.6
Labor	Pat Comben	6,634	45.1	+11.6
Liberal hold		Swing	−11.6	

1974 Queensland state election: Ashgrove
Party	Candidate	Votes	%	±%
Liberal	John Greenwood	5,772	44.1	+13.8
Labor	John Rees	4,040	30.9	−8.6
National	Hilda Brooks	2,757	21.1	+21.1
Queensland Labor	John Fox	515	3.9	−4.9
Total formal votes		13,084	98.8	−0.2
Informal votes		162	1.2	+0.2
Turnout		13,246	90.3	
Two-party-preferred result
Liberal	John Greenwood	8,962	68.5	+13.7
Labor	John Rees	4,122	31.5	−13.7
Liberal hold		Swing	+13.7	

1972 Queensland state election: Ashgrove
Party	Candidate	Votes	%	±%
Labor	Walter Tutt	4,597	39.5	−5.1
Liberal	Douglas Tooth	3,525	30.3	−15.3
Independent	Ivan Alcorn	2,507	21.5	+21.5
Queensland Labor	Bert Vann	1,019	8.7	−1.1
Total formal votes		11,648	99.0	
Informal votes		121	1.0	
Turnout		11,769	93.1	
Two-party-preferred result
Liberal	Douglas Tooth	6,378	54.8	−3.0
Labor	Walter Tutt	5,270	45.2	+3.0
Liberal hold		Swing	−3.0	

=== Elections in the 1960s ===
1969 Queensland state election: Ashgrove
Party	Candidate	Votes	%	±%
Liberal	Douglas Tooth	4,581	45.6	−8.3
Labor	Haydn Sargent	4,481	44.6	+8.6
Queensland Labor	George Cook	986	9.8	−0.3
Total formal votes		10,048	98.7	+0.4
Informal votes		129	1.3	−0.4
Turnout		10,177	92.5	−1.8
Two-party-preferred result
Liberal	Douglas Tooth	5,305	52.8	−8.4
Labor	Haydn Sargent	4,743	47.2	+8.4
Liberal hold		Swing	−8.4	

1966 Queensland state election: Ashgrove
Party	Candidate	Votes	%	±%
Liberal	Douglas Tooth	5,524	53.9	−0.8
Labor	Richard Gill	3,695	36.0	+0.4
Queensland Labor	George Cook	1,035	10.1	+0.4
Total formal votes		10,254	98.3	−0.4
Informal votes		173	1.7	+0.4
Turnout		10,427	94.3	−1.3
Two-party-preferred result
Liberal	Douglas Tooth	6,275	61.2	−0.6
Labor	Richard Gill	3,979	38.8	+0.6
Liberal hold		Swing	−0.6	

1963 Queensland state election: Ashgrove
Party	Candidate	Votes	%	±%
Liberal	Douglas Tooth	5,621	54.7	+4.4
Labor	Terry Kearney	3,653	35.6	+0.3
Queensland Labor	George Cook	992	9.7	−4.7
Total formal votes		10,266	98.7	−0.1
Informal votes		130	1.3	+0.1
Turnout		10,396	95.6	+1.3
Two-party-preferred result
Liberal	Douglas Tooth	6,341	61.8	
Labor	Terry Kearney	3,925	38.2	
Liberal hold		Swing	N/A	

1960 Queensland state election: Ashgrove
Party	Candidate	Votes	%	±%
Liberal	Douglas Tooth	5,228	50.3	+0.5
Labor	John Turner	3,662	35.3	+6.6
Queensland Labor	Thomas Heike	1,492	14.4	−7.0
Total formal votes		10,382	98.8	
Informal votes		123	1.2	
Turnout		10,505	94.3	
Liberal hold		Swing	−4.6	
