= Veivers =

Australian rugby league, cricketing & political family

Veivers is a surname. Notable people with the surname include:

- Emily Veivers (born 2001), PNG international rugby league player
- Greg Veivers (born 1949), Australian rugby league player
- Josh Veivers, English rugby league player
- Mick Veivers (born 1939), Australian rugby league player and politician
- Phil Veivers (born 1964), Australian rugby league player and coach
- Tom Veivers (born 1937), Australian cricketer and politician
