= Electoral results for the district of Cooper =

Queensland, Australia, district election results

This is a list of electoral results for the electoral district of Cooper in Queensland state elections.

== Members for Cooper ==
Member	Party	Term
Kate Jones	Labor	2017–2020
Jonty Bush	Labor	2020–present

== Election results ==
=== Elections in the 2020s ===
2024 Queensland state election: Cooper
Party	Candidate	Votes	%	±%
Labor	Jonty Bush	12,941	37.17	+3.07
Liberal National	Raewyn Bailey	11,889	34.15	+0.71
Greens	Katinka Winston-Allom	8,878	25.50	−4.13
One Nation	Susan Ventnor	746	2.14	+0.40
Family First	Donna Gallehawk	361	1.04	+1.04
Total formal votes		34,815	98.23	−0.47
Informal votes		627	1.77	+0.47
Turnout		35,442	91.74	+0.29
Two-party-preferred result
Labor	Jonty Bush	21,296	61.17	+0.68
Liberal National	Raewyn Bailey	13,519	38.83	−0.68
Labor hold		Swing	+0.68	

2020 Queensland state election: Cooper
Party	Candidate	Votes	%	±%
Labor	Jonty Bush	11,509	34.10	−6.73
Liberal National	Trent Wiseman	11,285	33.44	−2.15
Greens	Katinka Winston-Allom	10,000	29.63	+9.02
One Nation	Susan Ventnor	587	1.74	+1.74
Independent	Robert Wiltshire	366	1.08	−1.88
Total formal votes		33,747	98.70	+1.14
Informal votes		443	1.30	−1.14
Turnout		34,190	91.45	+1.49
Two-party-preferred result
Labor	Jonty Bush	20,414	60.49	−0.16
Liberal National	Trent Wiseman	13,333	39.51	+0.16
Labor hold		Swing	−0.16	

=== Elections in the 2010s ===
2017 Queensland state election: Cooper
Party	Candidate	Votes	%	±%
Labor	Kate Jones	13,205	40.8	+1.7
Liberal National	Robert Shearman	11,510	35.6	−8.1
Greens	Reece Walters	6,666	20.6	+5.2
Independent	Robert Wiltshire	960	3.0	+3.0
Total formal votes		32,341	97.6	−1.3
Informal votes		809	2.4	+1.3
Turnout		33,150	90.0	−0.2
Two-party-preferred result
Labor	Kate Jones	19,614	60.6	+7.3
Liberal National	Robert Shearman	12,727	39.4	−7.3
Labor hold		Swing	+7.3	
