= Kate Jones (politician) =

Australian politician (born 1979)

The Honourable Kate Jones

Minister for State Development of Queensland
- In office 11 May 2020 – 11 November 2020
- Premier: Annastacia Palaszczuk
- Preceded by: Cameron Dick
- Succeeded by: Steven Miles

Minister for Innovation of Queensland
- In office 12 December 2017 – 11 November 2020
- Premier: Annastacia Palaszczuk
- Preceded by: Leeanne Enoch
- Succeeded by: Stirling Hinchliffe

Minister for the Commonwealth Games of Queensland
- In office 10 February 2017 – 19 September 2019
- Premier: Annastacia Palaszczuk
- Preceded by: Stirling Hinchliffe
- Succeeded by: Position abolished

Minister for Tourism of Queensland
- In office 16 February 2015 – 11 November 2020
- Premier: Annastacia Palaszczuk
- Preceded by: Jann Stuckey
- Succeeded by: Stirling Hinchliffe

Minister for Education of Queensland
- In office 16 February 2015 – 11 December 2017
- Premier: Annastacia Palaszczuk
- Preceded by: John-Paul Langbroek
- Succeeded by: Grace Grace

Minister for Small Business and Commonwealth Games of Queensland
- In office 16 February 2015 – 8 December 2015
- Premier: Annastacia Palaszczuk
- Preceded by: Jann Stuckey
- Succeeded by: Leeanne Enoch (Small Business) Stirling Hinchliffe (Commonwealth Games)

Minister for the Environment, Resource Management and Climate Change of Queensland
- In office 28 March 2009 – 20 June 2011
- Premier: Anna Bligh
- Preceded by: Andrew McNamara
- Succeeded by: Vicky Darling

Member of the Queensland Parliament for Cooper
- In office 25 November 2017 – 31 October 2020
- Preceded by: New seat
- Succeeded by: Jonty Bush

Member of the Queensland Parliament for Ashgrove
- In office 31 January 2015 – 25 November 2017
- Preceded by: Campbell Newman
- Succeeded by: seat abolished
- In office 9 September 2006 – 24 March 2012
- Preceded by: Jim Fouras
- Succeeded by: Campbell Newman

Personal details
- Born: Kate Jennifer Jones; 10 April 1979 (age 47) Brisbane, Queensland, Australia
- Party: Labor
- Spouse: Paul Cronin (2009–present)
- Children: 2

Kate Jennifer Jones (born 10 April 1979) is an Australian former politician. She served as a Labor Party Member of Parliament in the Legislative Assembly of Queensland from 2006 to 2012, and again from 2015 to 2020. Jones first represented the seat of Ashgrove until she was defeated by eventual Premier Campbell Newman at the 2012 state election. Jones retook the seat for the Labor Party at the 2015 state election. The seat was abolished prior to the 2017 state election, so Jones contested and won the new seat of Cooper at that election. In the Palaszczuk Government, she was the Minister for Innovation and Tourism Industry Development, Minister for State Development and the Minister for the Commonwealth Games.

== Education and community involvement ==
Jones attended Kelvin Grove State High School in Kelvin Grove. In 1995 she was the Premier of the first ever YMCA Queensland Youth Parliament, a non-partisan political program for young people. She completed her Bachelor of Arts in Politics and Journalism at the Queensland University of Technology while working part-time at The Gap Markets, and graduated with a Master of Environmental Law from the Australian National University in 2014.

Jones is a member of the Ashgrove Historical Society, Ashgrove Climate Change Action Group and sits on the management committee of the Enoggera Respite Centre. She is also a member of The Fred Hollows Foundation and World Vision.

== Political career ==
Before entering Parliament, Jones worked as a Senior Media Adviser to Queensland Minister for Public Works, Housing and Racing Robert Schwarten and as Media Adviser to former Queensland Treasurer David Hamill.

Jones was elected to state Parliament for the seat of Ashgrove at the 2006 general election to succeed Jim Fouras, who had served as Speaker of the Legislative Assembly during the 1990s. After retaining her seat in the 2009 election, she was appointed Minister for Climate Change and Sustainability in the new Bligh cabinet, replacing Andrew McNamara.

=== 2012 election ===
Jones stood down from cabinet on 19 June 2011 to focus on defending her seat against newly elected LNP leader Campbell Newman at the 2012 state election.

At that election, Jones was defeated, suffering a 13 percent swing as part of the LNP's massive victory. Newman became Premier.

=== 2015 election ===
Jones sought to regain her old seat in the January 2015 state election. She won, defeating Newman on a swing of 10 percent—more than double what she needed. She became the second challenger to unseat a sitting premier in Queensland, the previous time this happened was in 1915.

=== 2017 election ===
Ashgrove was abolished prior to the 2017 state election, so Jones contested and won the new seat of Cooper.

=== Palaszczuk government ===
On 16 February 2015, Jones was sworn in as Minister for Education, Minister for Tourism, Major Events and Small Business and Minister for the Commonwealth Games in the Palaszczuk Ministry, positions she held until 11 December 2017.

On 12 December 2017, she was sworn in as Minister for Innovation and Tourism Development and Minister for the Commonwealth Games.

Jones announced her retirement on 10 September 2020, the last sitting day before the 2020 Queensland state election in October.

== Personal life ==
Kate Jones is married to Paul Cronin (former chief media adviser to Queensland Premiers Anna Bligh and Peter Beattie, and who now heads media relations at Aurizon. They have a son who was born in 2010.

Parliament of Queensland
Preceded by Jim Fouras	Member for Ashgrove; 2006–2012	Succeeded by Campbell Newman
Preceded by Campbell Newman	Member for Ashgrove; 2015–2017	Abolished
New seat	Member for Cooper; 2017–2020	Succeeded by Jonty Bush
Political offices
Preceded by Andrew McNamara	Minister for the Environment, Resource Management and Climate Change; 2009–2011	Succeeded by Vicky Darling
Preceded by John-Paul Langbroek	Minister for Education; 2015–2017	Succeeded by Grace Grace
Preceded by Jann Stuckey	Minister for Small Business; 2015	Succeeded by Leeanne Enoch
Preceded by Jann Stuckey	Minister for Tourism; 2015–2020	Succeeded by Stirling Hinchliffe
Preceded by Cameron Dick	Minister for State Development; 2020	Succeeded by Steven Miles
