= Bedford Playground =

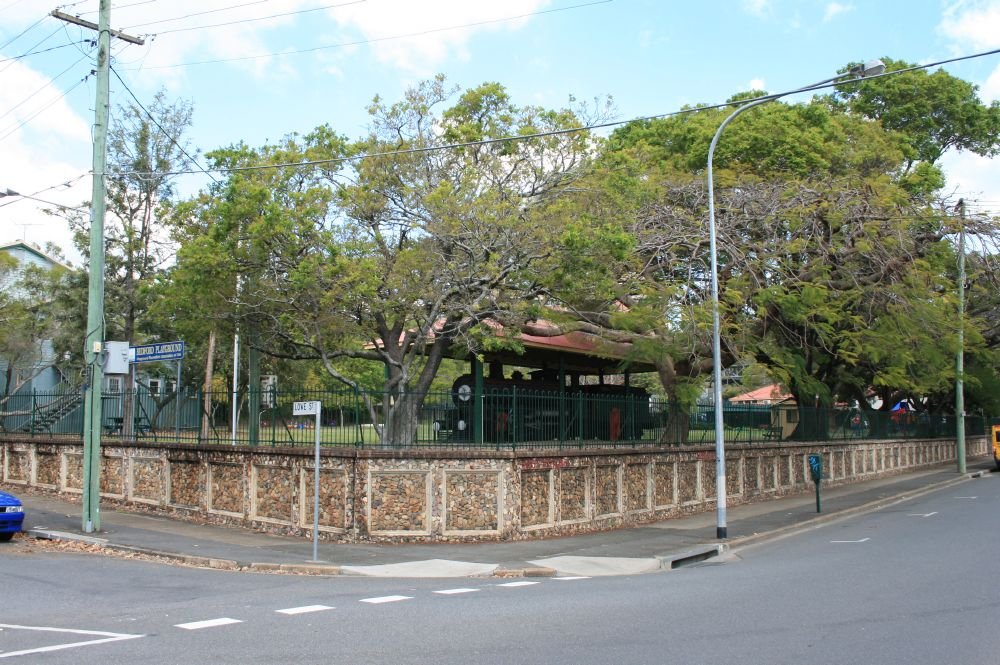
- Bedford Playground, 2008

- Location within Queensland Location within Australia
- 27.4573°S 153.0284°E
- Location: 8 Love Street, Spring Hill, City of Brisbane, Queensland, Australia

History
- Design period: 1919–1930s (interwar period)
- Built: 1927 onwards

Site notes
- Architect: Frank Gibson Costello

Queensland Heritage Register
- Official name: Bedford Playground, Bedford Park, Spring Hill Playground
- Type: state heritage (landscape)
- Designated: 9 May 1998
- Reference no.: 601786
- Significant period: 1920s (historical); 1920s–1940s (fabric grounds, planning); 1920s–ongoing (social)
- Significant components: hall, playground, garden – rock / rockery, trees/plantings
- Builders: Manuel Hornibrook

Bedford Playground is a heritage-listed playground at 8 Love Street, Spring Hill, City of Brisbane, Queensland, Australia. It was designed by Frank Gibson Costello and built from 1927 onwards, one of the builders being Sir Manuel Hornibrook. It is also known as Bedford Park and Spring Hill Playground. It was added to the Queensland Heritage Register on 9 May 1998.

== History ==
The Bedford Playground was established in 1927 as the third children's playground of the Playground Association of Queensland. The Park was officially named in 1959 in commemoration of Ms Mary Josephine Bedford, an early Brisbane philanthropist who was involved with the progress of family welfare and an integral and prolific member of the Playground Association.

The Playground Association of Queensland held their first meeting in 1913 and was formed to introduce concepts emanating from the United States movement toward providing public recreation parks and playgrounds. A comprehensive guide to the design and management of these new parks, written by landscape architects and social planners, Arthur and Lorna Leland was published in 1909 and many of the themes of this book were adopted by the Playground Association of Queensland in their mission statements. In a time of serious epidemics the Leland book, Playground Technique and Playcraft, promoted a revised level of care and protection of children, allowing them a better chance at success in life. The basic requirements advocated for the mental and physical well being of children were good food, air, sunshine and exercise. Of these basic requirements, the playgrounds provided for three, and were also thought to instil a love of nature and an appreciation of beautiful environments. The first playgrounds in America developed as part of this movement were in Charlesbank, Boston; Boone Park, Louisville; and many examples in Chicago all planned in the late nineteenth century. Many of these early playgrounds were designed by important landscape architect, Frederick Law Olmsted who was earlier involved with the highly influential design of Central Park, New York. Generally these American playgrounds were incorporated in large public recreation parks, usually with elements such as playgrounds, open air gymnasiums, running tracks and field houses, which provided covered accommodation for halls, administrative offices, libraries and club rooms.

Unlike the large recreation parks constructed in the United States for the whole community, the playgrounds established in Queensland by the Playground Association were planned on a smaller scale, focussing solely on children and providing a playground and usually a field house. Usually the playgrounds were associated with an adjacent kindergarten or crèche, and this is thought to have been due to Mary Josephine Bedford's involvement with the Crèche and Kindergarten Association. This group formed in 1907 with the purpose of instituting and maintaining day nurseries and free kindergartens for the children of the poor in Brisbane. Like the Playground Association, the Crèche and Kindergarten Association were successful in achieving local and Queensland Government sponsorship and funding as well as funding from various national philanthropic trust funds. The success of these two organisations can be rightly said to be due to the tireless and strategic work of Mary Josephine Bedford. Throughout her life Bedford, who is perhaps best remembered as the lifelong companion of Dr Lilian Violet Cooper, worked toward alleviating the stress and poverty afflicting urban dwellers. On her many study tours with Cooper, Bedford researched successful methods and programmes on the provision of family welfare in America and Europe and she is known to have attended lectures at the University of California, Berkeley on public recreation parks in about 1911, just two years before the Playground Association was established. Ms Bedford was associated with many of the early efforts in Brisbane to establish welfare; she was instrumental in increasing the scope of the Brisbane Children's Hospital in 1905, she was involved with the establishment of the Queensland branch of the National Council of Women also in 1905; she and Cooper were delegates at the International Council of Women in Stockholm in 1912, and in 1916 both Bedford and Cooper served in Serbia during World War I, Bedford as an ambulance driver for which she received the 5th Order of St Sava. Ms Bedford remained an active participant of both the Crèche and Kindergarten Association and the Playground Association until her death in December 1955. It is clearly through her extensive letter writing, evident in archival files on both organisations, that they achieved their successes.

The Playground Association in Queensland was formed with the practical intention of promoting the establishment of children's playgrounds and recreation centres in districts of poverty and high density. Also the Association worked towards assuming the administration of the parks and providing trained supervisors who were to direct play and, through this, to instil the values of courage, honesty and consideration in the children. The supervisors were also to look after the playground libraries, teach hand work and also to liaise with the children's homes. The Association was interested in the full social development of the child and saw the lessons learnt during play as an adjunct to the lessons the children studied in their classrooms.

The sites chosen for the three playgrounds managed by the Playground Association in their formative years were at Paddington, established 1918; East Street Fortitude Valley, 1922 and Spring Hill established 1927. All three were places of high density low cost housing. The characteristics of the sites were similar as well; the site was usually undeveloped and lying stagnant for various reasons, at Paddington the playground was part of a former cemetery and the Spring Hill playground was constructed on a former quarry site. The playgrounds were planned within a short distance of the local state school, usually near swimming baths and central to the density of housing surrounding the playground. They were planned with several mandatory features; a boundary fence to aid supervision and protection of the child, borders within the playground separating girls, boys and toddlers, a field house and a well considered plan incorporating play equipment and open space. The playgrounds were planned as model examples of recreational facilities for children, to be copied in both management and planning by schools and local councils across Queensland. Certainly the playgrounds established by the Playground Association foreshadowed a period of intense playground development in suburban Brisbane when a number were established by various groups, usually the city council or a local progress association. In 1938 a list was made of eight playgrounds managed or funded through the Brisbane City Council but not including those in which the Playground Association was involved. Like the three model playgrounds, the Brisbane City Council playgrounds were found in high density, inner city areas and included one in the Domain of the Brisbane Botanic Gardens. Over the next ten years the Council continued to acquire sites for playgrounds, although only those playgrounds managed by the Playground Association were supervised, a practice which continues to this day.

The playground created in Water Street, Spring Hill utilised the site of an early Brisbane quarry which had closed. From the 1860s until its closure in the early twentieth century the Spring Hill porphyry quarry was one of a series of quarries stretching along a porphyry seam extending north and south from the city. Porphyry is formed from volcanic ash, consolidated and hardened in the presence of solutions containing silica. The presence of various iron and manganese oxides results in a range of possible colours. Given the variance in strength through the stone, porphyry is not usually cut into ashlar blocks but often left rockfaced to minimise disturbance. Stone from the Spring Hill quarry was thought to be used in construction of the early Brisbane Normal School and other early Brisbane buildings. The quarry was closed by the early twentieth century.

On 22 January 1918 the land around the quarry was divided into twelve allotments and offered for sale. Only one portion of this subdivision was sold, that on the corner of Water and Love Streets to a Mrs Kate Downey. The twelve allotments remained undeveloped until 1924 when the Brisbane City Council were granted the land by the Queensland Government for use as a park on behalf of the Playground Association who offered to undertake supervision and management on their third Brisbane project after Paddington and Fortitude Valley.

The Spring Hill Playground was officially gazetted as a reserve for a Children's Playground on 20 March 1924. Mrs Downey surrendered her lot in the following year and the entire reserve was re-gazetted on 12 November 1925, measuring 1 acre (0.40 ha) and 36 perches (910 m^{2}). The early playground on the site was along the Water Street boundary, another park reserve was gazetted around the former quarry site, which the Playground Association assumed in recent years, increasing the size of the original playground.

Few early plans of the Spring Hill playground have been located, it seems, however, that it was originally planned with three principal sections divided by fences; the boys were closest to the Love Street end of the site and the girls at the Quarry Street end, divided by the infants section which was centrally located. A field house, or supervisor's cottage with a free library was located to the north of the girls section and toilets were provided for the girls and infants within the field house. The boys' toilets were in the northern eastern corner of their section. The field house was an early timber cottage moved to the playground from another site. Re-fencing in chain link occurred in 1935, further increasing security.

In 1945 a war memorial hall was opened at the playground, designed by the City Architect and funded by public appeal supplemented by the state and local council. The tender was awarded to MR Hornibrook who completed the work for £2517. The building was constructed to commemorate those from Paddington, Spring Hill and Fortitude Valley who served during World War II. The original supervisor's cottage was burnt down in 1959 and the Brisbane City Council donated the insurance money to the Playground Association to allow them to infill the undercroft of the Memorial Hall for use as a library.

Mary Josephine Bedford died on 22 December 1955 and to commemorate her instrumental role in the provision of playgrounds in Queensland a memorial tree was planted on 22 March 1956 at the Spring Hill Playground by Lady Lavarck, wife of Lieutenant-General Sir John Dudley Lavarack, Governor of Queensland. In 1959 the Brisbane City Council agreed to the suggestion of the Playground and Recreation Association to rename the park, the Bedford Playground in memory of Ms Bedford.

In December 1971 an area of land on the Quarry Street side of the park was excised for Health Purposes and this became the home of the Shaftsbury Citizenship Centre. Again, in March 1989 land at the corner of Quarry and Water Streets was excised for Local Government Purposes and this block of land is now the Lady Gowrie Occasional Child Care Centre, providing an additional service to the Lady Gowrie Child Care Centre which is at the St Paul's Terrace end of Love Street.

== Description ==
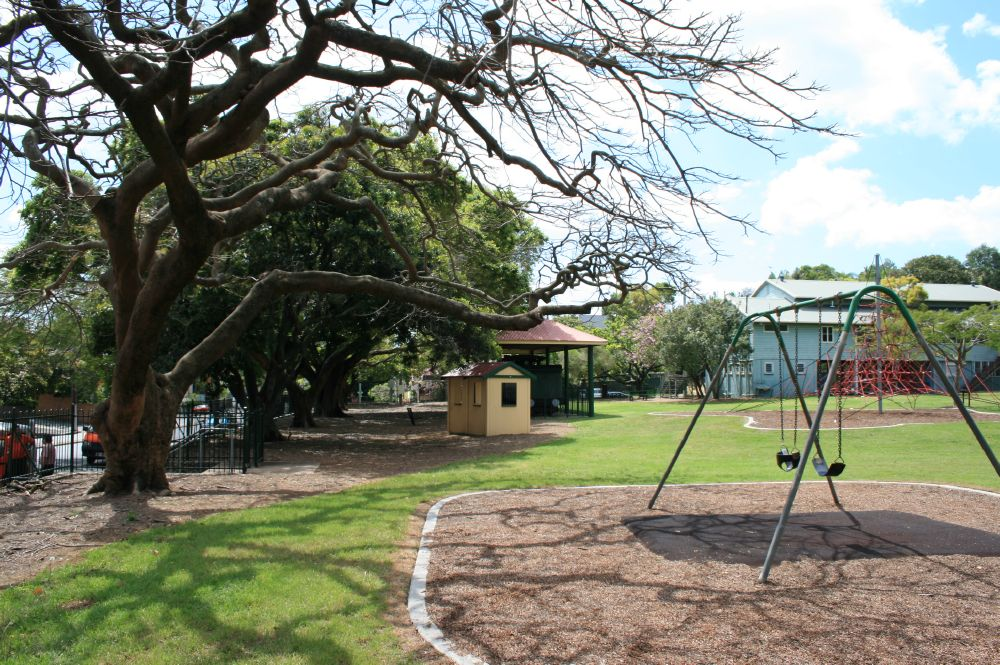
Play equipment, 2008

Bedford Playground comprises a large area of open space incorporating tennis courts, play equipment, an old steam locomotive, an elevated timber hall, a number of established trees and a large outcrop of porphyry formerly used as a quarry. The reserve is bounded on three sides by Water, Love and Quarry Streets and on the fourth side by dense vegetation concealing development beyond to the south east. At the corner of Quarry and Waters, on excised land, is a fenced timber building used as the Lady Gowrie Occasional Child Care Centre.

Entrance to the playground is via a driveway and pathway from Love Street. A high chain link fence surrounds the site. Where the ground is cut down for a road at the corner of Love and Water Streets, a retaining wall is clad with rubble stonework featuring recessed panels surrounded by concrete mouldings. A steel sign "BEDFORD PLAYGROUND" is adjacent to the entrance to the site.

Within the playground, near the entrance of the playground is a large elevated hall with a substantially infilled undercroft. The building which has a rectangular plan running parallel to the Love Street boundary, has a gabled roof clad with "super six" corrugated fibrous cement sheeting. Strip windows line the long sides of the building and smaller individual windows are found on the shorter ends. Entrance to the building is via a straight timber stair on the north eastern facade.

The most prominent feature of the playground is the large porphyry outcrop which is in the southern corner of the site. Partially concealing the outcrop are a large number of trees and plantings, growing around the base and on the stone itself. The outcrop has evidence of cutting on its north eastern face and varies in height from about 2 to 10 metres (6 ft 7 in to 32 ft 10 in). Also on this face of the outcrop is a plaque cut from the stone with lettering "BRISBANE CITY COUNCIL: THIS QUARRY IS PRESERVED FOR ITS GREAT GEOLOGICAL INTEREST". Cut into the north western side of the outcrop is a winding and uneven concrete stair, the dimensions of which suggest that it was built for the use of children. The stair leads to a path which winds north east through the vegetation on the top of the outcrop, leading to a now overgrown lookout.

Recent metal, plastic and timber play equipment is found in the central part of the playground. Situated among the new equipment is a small play house known as the Betty Mansion, from the sign on the front of the structure. This is a model play version of a two storeyed interwar house, built on a concrete slab with reinforced concrete walls and finely detailed openings including a moulded and panelled front door. The entrance door is in a bay projecting from the front, north eastern facade. The bay terminates in a stepped parapet decorated with three vertical fins and the signage panel. Aside from this structure the early playground equipment has been replaced, although remnants of an Aladdin's Cave remain in the north western side of the outcrop and partially embedded concrete slabs provide evidence of earlier equipment.

A tennis court is found on a raised terrace on the south eastern border of the playground, adjacent to the outcrop. A steam locomotive is located in the north western corner of the site and is surrounded by a large steel fence.

One of the features of the playgrounds is the large number of established trees. Along the Water Street boundary are large shade trees providing privacy to the playground. Large trees are also found on the other boundaries and within the playground.

== Heritage listing ==
Bedford Playground was listed on the Queensland Heritage Register on 9 May 1998 having satisfied the following criteria.

The place is important in demonstrating the evolution or pattern of Queensland's history.

Bedford Playground which was established in 1927 is important in demonstrating the pattern of growth of the working class suburbs of inner city Brisbane, particularly Spring Hill. The playgrounds demonstrate early twentieth century philosophies of child care, particularly in relation to the importance of adequately providing for children in poorer communities to provide a better chance of their future success. The playground contains a substantial porphyry outcrop, remnant from an early quarry which was established in the 1860s, providing evidence of the early construction industry of Brisbane and a rare example of "untamed" landscape in inner city Brisbane. The park is important as an integral example of the small number of open parks in the CBD and Spring Hill area.

The place demonstrates rare, uncommon or endangered aspects of Queensland's cultural heritage.

A rare example of "untamed" landscape in inner city Brisbane.

The place is important in demonstrating the principal characteristics of a particular class of cultural places.

The playground demonstrates the principal characteristics of early model playgrounds formed by the Playground Association of Queensland and influenced by similar American models. This is particularly evident in the siting, and elements such as the memorial hall, the Betty Mansion (an early play fixture) and established plantings.

The place is important because of its aesthetic significance.

The site has aesthetic significance as a public open space with established plantings forming a substantial element of the Spring Hill townscape. The former quarry is of particular aesthetic interest as a bold, natural form visibly contrasting with its immediate surrounds and visually linked to the large outcrops on St Paul's Terrace.

The place has a strong or special association with a particular community or cultural group for social, cultural or spiritual reasons.

The playground has special associations with the surrounding community as well known public recreation reserve and supervised children's playground.

The place has a special association with the life or work of a particular person, group or organisation of importance in Queensland's history.

Bedford Playground has a special association with Ms Mary Josephine Bedford, an early Brisbane philanthropist who successfully instigated many elements of family welfare in working class suburbs of Brisbane through her involvement with both the Playground Association and the Crèche and Kindergarten Association.
