= OLGR =

OLGR may refer to:

- "Liquor and Gaming NSW", successor agency to the Office of Liquor, Gaming and Racing, a New South Wales government agency
- Office of Liquor and Gaming Regulation, a Queensland government agency
