= Department of Justice (Queensland) =

State government department in Queensland, Australia

Department overview
- Formed: 1992; 34 years ago
- Preceding agencies: Department of Justice and Attorney-General; Department of Justice and Corrective Services; Department of Attorney-General; Department of Consumer Affairs; Department of Corrective Services
- Jurisdiction: Queensland
- Headquarters: State Law Building, Brisbane
- Ministers responsible: Deb Frecklington, attorney-general and minister for justice; Daniel Purdie, minister for police
- Department executive: Sarah Cruickshank, Director-general
- Child agencies: Queensland Human Rights Commission; Queensland Civil and Administrative Tribunal; Office of Liquor and Gaming Regulation; Electoral Commission of Queensland; Crime and Corruption Commission; Director of Public Prosecutions; Queensland Law Reform Commission
- Website: justice.qld.gov.au

The Department of Justice is a Queensland Government department responsible for the administration of justice, Queensland courts, regulatory policy, consumer protection, legal aid, and other community and legal services.

The department is led by Director-General Sarah Cruickshank, with responsibilities overseen by the attorney-general of Queensland, the minister for justice, and the minister for police. The department's headquarters are located in the State Law Building on Ann Street, Brisbane.

== History ==
The origins of the Department of Justice and Attorney-General can be traced back to 1859 with the appointment of the first Attorney-General of Queensland in 1859 with the establishment of the Colony of Queensland.

=== 19th century ===
In 1859, Queensland became a separate colony from New South Wales with Ratcliffe Pring QC appointed as first Attorney-General of Queensland and Robert Little appointed Queensland's first Crown Solicitor. The first sitting of the Queensland Legislative Assembly occurred in 1860. In 1863, Sir James Cockle was appointed as the first Chief Justice of Queensland. In 1866, the District Court of Queensland was established to ease the workload of the Supreme Court. In 1874, the Northern Supreme Court at Bowen was opened, the first to be built outside of Brisbane. In 1879, the Brisbane Supreme Court on George Street was opened. In 1886, the Justices Act 1886 was drafted and presented to parliament. In 1899, the Northern Supreme Court was moved from Bowen to Townsville.

=== 20th century ===
In 1921, the Supreme Court Act 1921 was passed, resulting in the abolition of the District Court of Queensland. This was followed by in 1922 with the establishment of the Magistrates Court in the civil arena while the criminal jurisdiction was transferred to the Supreme Court.

The State Reporting Bureau was established in 1926 to provide court-reporting and hansard services.

In 1958, the District Court of Queensland was re-established by Parliament. In 1959, the Offenders Probation and Parole Act 1959 was introduced with provisions on juvenile justice. In 1970, the department developed the Consumer Affairs Bureau. In 1984, the Office of the Director of Public Prosecutions was created. The first Solicitor-General of Queensland was appointed under the Solicitor-General Act 1985.

In the early 1990s, the Attorney-General functions were separated from the justice portfolio. Justice retained the majority of its existing portfolio functions and inherited Corrective Services, creating the Department of Justice and Corrective Services. In 1992, the Departments of Justice and Attorney-General were re-joined and Arts policy was added to DJAG. Corrective Services went to its own portfolio and the fair trading and consumer affairs components were separated to form the Department of Consumer Affairs.

=== 21st century ===
The passage of the Guardianship and Administration Act 2000 led to the appointment of an Adult Guardian. In 2003, the Office of the State Coroner was created. In 2004, the Drug Courts and the Legal Services Commission were established. In 2007, the Office of Fair Trading, the Commercial and Consumer Tribunal, the Retail Shop Leases Registry, and the Office for Body Corporate and Community Management moved from the Department of Consumer Affairs to the Department of Justice and Attorney-General. In 2009, Victim Assist Queensland was established to support victims of violent crime and the Queensland Civil and Administrative Tribunal was established bringing together 23 separate civil, human rights and administrative tribunals.

In 2010, the Queensland Sentencing Advisory Council was established. In 2011, the Office of Liquor and Gaming Regulation joined DJAG. Under the Newman Government in 2012, Youth Justice joined DJAG from the Department of Communities the Sentencing Advisory Council was abolished. In 2013, the Queensland Corrective Services was transferred into DJAG. In 2014, the Office of the Public Guardian was established. In 2015, the trial specialist domestic and family violence court at Southport commenced. In 2015, the Office of the Director of Child Protection Litigation commenced and the Queensland Sentencing Advisory Council was re-established.

Following the 2017 Queensland state election and the machinery of government changes by the re-elected Palaszczuk Labor Government, the Youth Justice was moved to the newly established Department of Child Safety, Youth and Women and the Queensland Corrective Services becoming their own portfolio agency.

In November 2024, the newly elected Crisafulli ministry changed the name of the department, from the Department of Justice and Attorney-General, to the Department of Justice. The Queensland State Archives were added as a child agency. Responsibility for women's safety was moved to the Department of Families, Seniors, Disability Services and Child Safety, and the Victim Assist Queensland service to the Department of Youth Justice and Victim Support.

== Role and responsibilities ==
The Department of Justice is responsible for a range of legal, policy and judicial functions.

== Organisational structure ==
=== Office of the Director-General ===
- Crown Law
- Internal Audit Branch
- Ethical Standards Unit
- Executive Services Branch

=== Justice Services ===
- Queensland Courts Service
  - Supreme, District and Land Courts’ Service
  - Magistrates Courts Service
  - Reform and Support Services
- Community Justice Services
  - Dispute Resolution Branch
  - Justice of the Peace Branch
  - Registry of Births, Deaths and Marriages
  - Victim Assist Queensland
  - Office of the Commissioner for Body Corporate and Community Management
  - Blue Card Services
- Legal Assistance Strategy and Funding Unit
- Queensland Civil and Administrative Tribunal

=== Liquor, Gaming and Fair Trading ===
- Office of Fair Trading
- Office of Liquor and Gaming Regulation
- Office of Regulatory Policy

=== Strategic Policy and Legal Services ===
- Legal Services Coordination Unit
- Legal Advice and Advocacy
- Right to Information and Privacy
- Strategic Policy and Child Safety

=== Corporate Services ===
- Financial Services Branch
- Facilities Services
- Information Technology Services
- Human Resources Branch
- Communication Services

== Portfolio agencies ==
The following agencies are administered by the department:

- Crime and Corruption Commission
- Electoral Commission of Queensland
- Queensland Ombudsman
- Queensland Information Commissioner
- Parole Board Queensland
- Anti‐Discrimination Commission Queensland
- Director of Public Prosecutions (Queensland)
- Director of Child Protection Litigation
- Queensland Human Rights Commission, led by the Queensland Human Rights Commissioner, independent of government, accountable to the Queensland Parliament through the Attorney-General and Minister for Justice
- Legal Aid Queensland
- Queensland Legal Services Commissioner
- Public Advocate (Queensland)
- Public Guardian (Queensland)
- Queensland Prostitution Licensing Authority
- Public Trustee (Queensland)
- Queensland Law Reform Commission
- Queensland Sentencing Advisory Council
