= Mary Josephine Bedford =

Australian philanthropist and WWI ambulance driver (1861-1955)

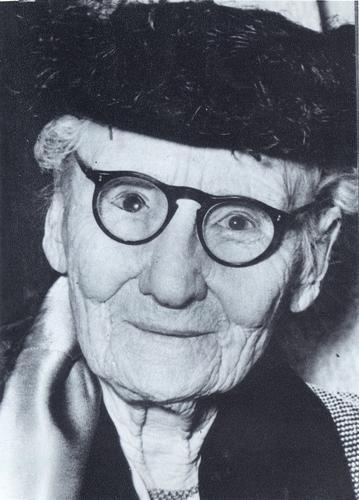
- Josephine Bedford, circa 1954
- Born: 1861; England
- Died: 22 December 1955 (aged 93–94)
- Occupation: Philanthropist
- Known for: Family welfare and children's development through her involvement with the Playground Association and the Crèche and Kindergarten Association

Mary Josephine Bedford (1861 – 22 December 1955) was a philanthropist in Brisbane, Queensland, Australia, who was involved in family welfare and children's development through her involvement with the Playground Association and the Crèche and Kindergarten Association. She was awarded the Order of St Sava for her services as an ambulance driver in World War I.

== Early life ==
Mary Josephine Bedford was born in 1861 in England to Eleanor Steele and George Augustus Bedford. Her first cousin was Frederick Bedford. In her student days, she shared accommodation in Chatham, Kent, with Lilian Cooper who became her lifelong friend and companion. They immigrated to Brisbane together in 1891.

== Philanthropy ==
The Playground Association in Queensland was formed with the practical intention of promoting the establishment of children's playgrounds and recreation centres in districts of poverty and high density. Also the Association worked towards assuming the administration of the parks and providing trained supervisors who were to direct play and, through this, to instil the values of courage, honesty and consideration in the children. The supervisors were also to look after the playground libraries, teach hand work and also to liaise with the children's homes. The Association was interested in the full social development of the child and saw the lessons learnt during play as an adjunct to the lessons the children studied in their classrooms.

The Crèche and Kindergarten Association was formed in 1907 with the purpose of instituting and maintaining day nurseries and free kindergartens for the children of the poor in Brisbane. Like the Playground Association, the Crèche and Kindergarten Association were successful in achieving local and Queensland Government sponsorship and funding as well as funding from various national philanthropic trust funds. The success of these two organisations can be rightly said to be due to the tireless and strategic work of Mary Josephine Bedford.

Bedford, who is also remembered as the lifelong companion of Dr Lilian Violet Cooper, worked toward alleviating the stress and poverty afflicting urban dwellers. On her many study tours with Cooper, Bedford researched successful methods and programmes on the provision of family welfare in America and Europe and she is known to have attended lectures at the University of California, Berkeley on public recreation parks in about 1911, just two years before the Playground Association was established. Ms Bedford was associated with many of the early efforts in Brisbane to establish welfare; she was instrumental in increasing the scope of the Brisbane Children's Hospital in 1905, she was involved with the establishment of the Queensland branch of the National Council of Women also in 1905; she and Cooper were delegates at the International Council of Women in Stockholm in 1912.

== World War I ==
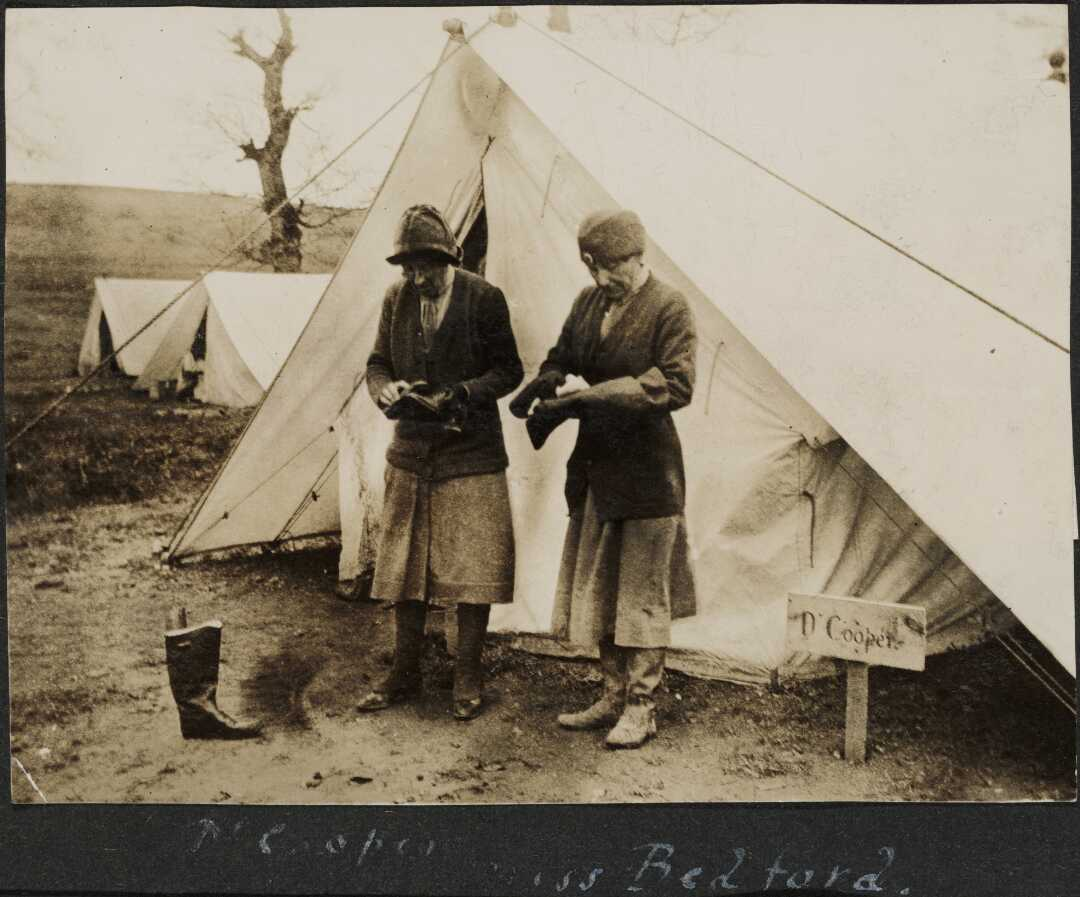
Doctor Lilian Cooper and Josephine Bedford, Serbian Macedonia. c.1916-1917.

In 1916 both Bedford and Cooper served in Serbia during World War I with the Scottish Women's Hospitals for Foreign Service as the Australian Army would only accept women as nurses. They joined the Ostrovo unit in Serbian Macedonia, under the command of Australian Doctor Agnes Bennett. Cooper worked as a surgeon, while Bedford was in charge of the fleet of 12 customised T-model Ford ambulances. They were both awarded honours for their service, with Bedford receiving the 5th class Order of St Sava.

== After World War I ==
Bedford became a Founder of the Creche and Kindergarten (C&K) Association and in 1920 she was elected to the National Council of Women. Bedford remained an active participant of both the Crèche and Kindergarten Association and the Playground Association throughout her life. It is clearly through her extensive letter writing, evident in archival files on both organisations, that they achieved their successes.

== Later life ==
Bedford died on 22 December 1955, and is buried next to her lifelong companion, Lilian Violet Cooper at Toowong Cemetery, Brisbane, Queensland, Australia.

== Legacy ==
To commemorate Bedford's instrumental role in the provision of playgrounds in Queensland a memorial tree was planted on 22 March 1956 at the Spring Hill Playground by Lady Lavarck, wife of Lieutenant-General Sir John Dudley Lavarack, Governor of Queensland. In 1959 the Brisbane City Council agreed to the suggestion of the Playground and Recreation Association to rename the park, the Bedford Playground. The Bedford Playground was added to the Queensland Heritage Register on 9 May 1998.

In 2020 the State Library of Queensland produced their 'Dangerous Women' podcast series which features and episode on Dr Lilian Cooper and Josephine Bedford and their life achievements.

== See also ==
- Other notable women volunteers in the Scottish Women's Hospitals for Foreign Service
- Women in World War I
- Australian women in World War I
- The Serbian campaign (1914-1915)
