= Phil Veivers =

Rugby league footballer and coach

Personal information
- Full name: Philip James Veivers
- Born: 25 May 1964 (age 62) Beaudesert, Queensland, Australia

Playing information
- Position: Fullback
Club
Years	Team	Pld	T	G	FG	P
	Souths (Brisbane)
1984–96	St Helens	381	98	0	5	397
1996–98	Huddersfield	53	8	1	1	35
2001–02	Swinton	21	5	0	0	20
	Total	455	111	1	6	452
Representative
Years	Team	Pld	T	G	FG	P
1997	Scotland	1	0	0	0	0

Coaching information
Club
Years	Team	Gms	W	D	L	W%
1998	Huddersfield	10	0	0	10	0
2001	Huddersfield-Sheffield	10	2	0	8	20
2002	Swinton Lions	18	6	1	11	33
2011–13	Salford City Reds	50	17	1	32	34
2014–16	Workington Town	89	30	3	56	34
	Total	177	55	5	117	31
- Relatives: Josh Veivers (son); Greg Veivers (brother); Mick Veivers (cousin); Tom Veivers (cousin); Wayne Bennett (brother-in-law)

Philip James Veivers (born 25 May 1964) is a former Scotland international rugby league footballer. He played for the Southern Suburbs, St. Helens and Huddersfield as a fullback. He is the brother of Australian international rugby league captain Greg Veivers.

== Background ==
Veivers was born in Beaudesert, Queensland, Australia. His father, Jack, played rugby league for Souths and Queensland; his cousin, Mick Veivers, represented the Australia in the 1960s, and his cousin Tom Veivers played Test cricket for Australia.

== Career ==
He moved to St. Helens the same time fellow Australian and Souths teammate Mal Meninga did, but where Meninga returned to his homeland Veivers stayed in England after marrying and having children, only returning to Australia for holidays and visiting his family. He was assistant to Brian Noble who was in charge of Bradford Bulls through their trophy days and continued partnership with Noble at Wigan.

In 1997, he represented Scotland in a match against France.

Veivers had a spell as caretaker manager at Salford when Shaun McRae was ill and was promoted from assistant coach to head coach in November 2011. He was sacked as head coach at Salford after four games in the 2013 Super League season.

After losing his job at Salford, Veivers served as assistant coach to the Exiles in the international origin series before finally landing a job at Workington Town in the Championship

== County Cup Final appearances ==
Phil Veivers played fullback (replaced by substitute Roy Haggerty) in St. Helens 28–16 victory over Wigan in the 1984 Lancashire Cup Final during the 1984–85 season at Central Park, Wigan on Sunday 28 October 1984, played stand-off, and scored 2-tries in the 24–14 victory over Rochdale Hornets in the 1991 Lancashire Cup Final during the 1991–92 season at Wilderspool Stadium, Warrington on Sunday 20 October 1991, and played fullback (replaced by substitute Gus O'Donnell) in the 4–5 defeat by Wigan in the 1992 Lancashire Cup Final during the 1992–93 season at Knowsley Road, St. Helens on Sunday 18 October 1992.

== John Player Special Trophy Final appearances ==
Phil Veivers played fullback in St. Helens' 15–14 victory over Leeds in the 1987–88 John Player Special Trophy Final during the 1987–88 season at Central Park, Wigan on Saturday 9 January 1988.
