= Frank Gibson Costello =

Australian architect (1903–1987)

Frank Gibson Costello (1903–1987) was an Australian architect. A number of his works are now listed on the Queensland Heritage Register.

== Early life ==
Frank Costello was born in Sydney on 1 February 1903, the son of Richard and Isabella Costello. He attended North Sydney Boys High School and Sydney Technical College.

== Career ==
He commenced his career as a cadet draftsman in the New South Wales public service. He became a registered architect in 1927. Between 1928 and 1931, he received a scholarship that allowed him to travel to Britain and Europe where he worked on a number of projects and travelled extensively. On returning to Australia, he worked in Sydney including undertaking teaching at the Sydney Technical College.

In 1941, he became the City Architect for the City of Brisbane. In this role he designed a range of utilitarian structures such as electricity substations, public toilets and bomb shelters (during World War II). He also used his town planning skills to improve the Brisbane central business district by removing markets and wharves and introducing parks and gardens. He tried to introduce a green belt around Brisbane to maintain a separation from its satellite suburbs such as Sandgate, Wynnum, but there was opposition from those who would profit by the sale of the land for houses as well as fears that it would drive up prices within the green belt to unaffordable levels; following a successful legal challenge, the green belt proposal did not proceed. In 1952, the election victory of the Australian Labor Party in the Brisbane City Council resulted in many sackings of senior council staff including Costello.

Between 1952 and 1958, Costello was in a private practice partnership with Harold Cook and Walter Kerrison.

In 1958, Costello was appointed to be an architect in the Public Works Department of the Queensland Government, where he mostly worked on the design of schools.

== Later life ==
Costello retired from the Queensland Government on 30 June 1969, but continued his involvement in part-time teaching at the Central Technical College (now part of Queensland University of Technology). He retired from teaching in 1975 and died on 19 June 1987.

== Works ==
His architectural works include:

- Bedford Playground at Spring Hill
- Howard Smith Wharves in Brisbane central business district
- Mt Coot-tha Lookout & Kiosk
