= Victim Assist Queensland =

Agency overview
- Formed: 2009
- Preceding agency: Criminal Injury Compensation Unit
- Jurisdiction: State of Queensland
- Headquarters: Brisbane, Queensland
- Minister responsible: Attorney-General of Queensland
- Agency executive: Dean Corless, Director
- Parent department: Queensland Government Department of Justice
- Parent agency: Community Justice Services
- Child agencies: Victim Services Coordination Unit; Financial Assistance Unit
- Key document: Victims of Crime Assistance Act 2009
- Website: www.qld.gov.au/victims

Victim Assist Queensland (VAQ) is an agency of the Queensland Government Department of Justice that provides information, advice and financial assistance to victims of violent crime and domestic violence throughout the State of Queensland. VAQ also oversees the implementation of and complaints under the Queensland Charter of Victims' Rights, provides court support, and coordinates interagency referrals including with the Queensland Police Service.

== History ==
VAQ was established in 2009 with the entering into force of the Victims of Crime Assistance Act 2009 (VOCA). Prior to VOCA, the criminal compensation scheme was managed under the Criminal Offence Victims Act 1995 (COVA) by the former Criminal Injury Compensation Unit within the Department of Justice. Prior to COVA, the victims compensation scheme was provided for by the Criminal Code Act 1899 (CODA) by the Queensland courts.

== Role and responsibilities ==
VAQ is a public service agency of the Queensland Government Department of Justice and therefore is responsible to the Queensland Parliament via the Queensland Attorney-General. VAQ comprises the Victim Services Coordination Unit (VSCU) and the Financial Assistance Unit (FAU).

=== Financial Assistance Scheme ===
The principal focus of Victim Assist Queensland is the financial assistance scheme for victims of violent crime for out of pocket expenses for safety and recovery needs. VAQ administers an evidence-based assessment process of applications from primary victims, witnesses, parents of child victims, and close family members of homicide victims.

=== Information and Referral Service ===
The Information and Referral Service, known as LinkUp, is a central point of information about financial assistance, advice about victims' rights, and referrals to support service. LinkUp operates a helpline during business hours and provides information in-person by appointment and via email. LinkUp also manages the interagency referrals system with the Queensland Police Service.

=== High Risk Teams ===
With the implementation of the recommendations of the Not Now, Not Ever Report, the Queensland Government established integrated interagency teams for victims of domestic violence at high risk of homicide. Victim Assist Queensland officers along with the police officers, child safety officers, probation and parole officers, and local support services provide case management and information sharing for high risk victims.

=== Victim Coordination Program ===
Victim Assist Queensland operates a regional victim coordination program with officers in Ipswich, Rockhampton, and Cairns. Victim Coordination Officers provide support to victims and their families in attending court, drafting victim impact statements, and applying for financial assistance. VAQ also maintains a Regional Coordinators in Townsville and in Cairns for capacity building with government agencies and community organisations and for Aboriginal and Torres Strait Islander engagement.

=== Victim Services Funding Program ===
VAQ also administers the Victim Services Funding Program which provides funding to non-profit organisations to support victims of violent crime in Queensland. Recipient organisations include Relationships Australia to run the Victim Counselling and Support Service, the Queensland Homicide Victim Support Group, and the Court Network.

== Notable staff ==
Victims rights activist and the 2009 Young Australian of the Year, Jonty Bush, worked at Victim Assist Queensland as Community Liaison and Research Officer and Acting Director.
