= Gambling in Australia =

Gambling is an activity undertaken by the majority of Australians. Australians placed bets totalling $244.3 billion in 2022–23, positioning them as the world's leading gamblers. During the same period, losses from gambling amounted to $31.5 billion.

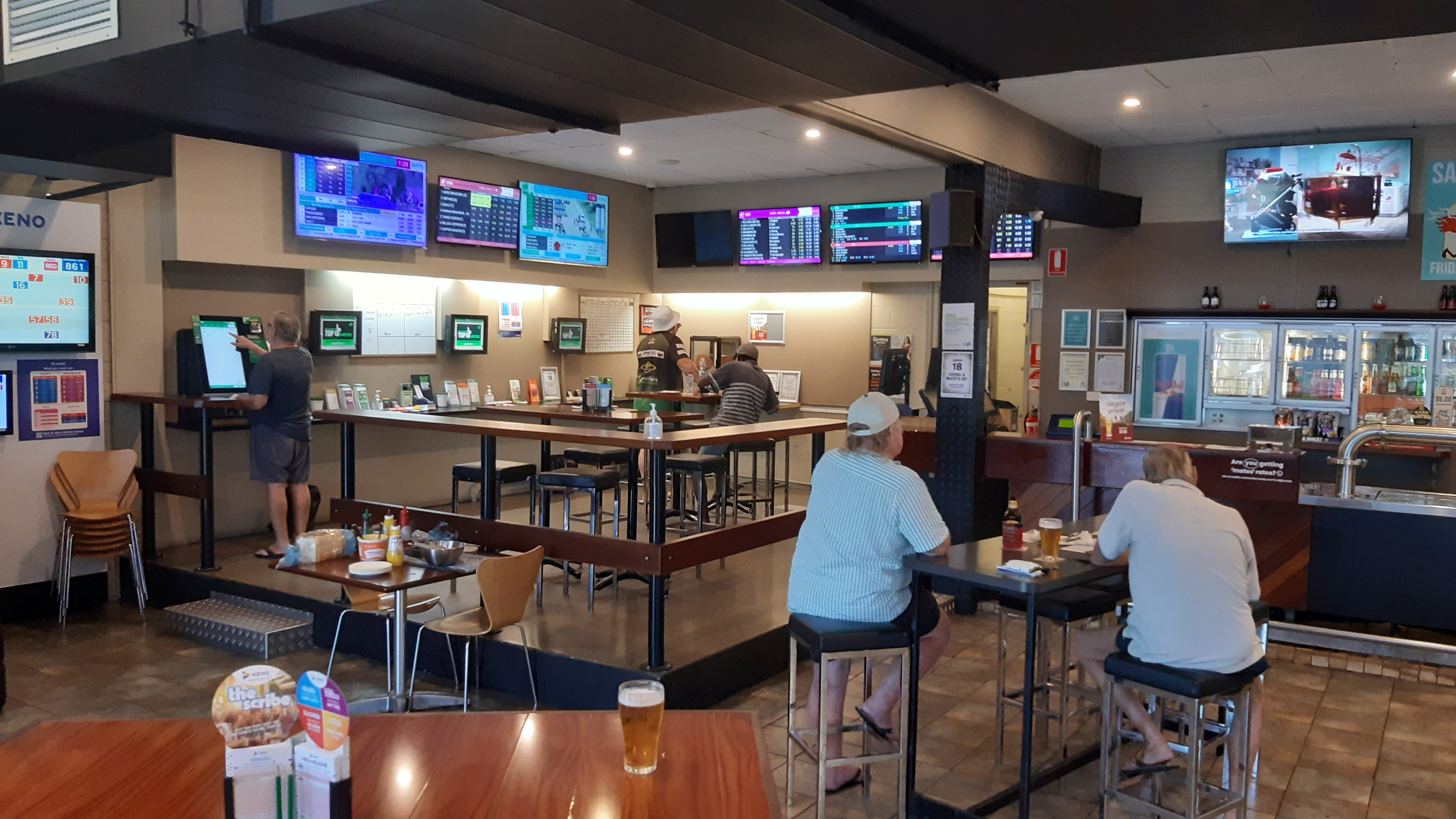
The bar at the Hermit Park Hotel, Townsville, Queensland where a portion of the bar is sectioned for gambling purposes. This practice is typical of most bars in Townsville

In 2022, 72.8% of Australian adults gambled within the previous 12 months (80.5% for men and 66.2% for women) and 38% of Australian adults gambled at least once per week (48% for men and 28% for women). In 2007, Australians were estimated to lead the world with the highest gambling losses on a per-capita basis. Australians spend more on online gambling than any other country in the world.

On a per-capita basis, Australians placed gambling bets worth AUD$9,885 in financial year 2020–2021, resulting in a loss of AUD$1,200. Australians cumulatively placed bets worth AUD$198 billion in this financial year, resulting in a total loss of AUD$24 billion.

Gambling is a significant public health issue, with around 80,000 to 160,000 (or 0.5–1.0%) of Australian adults experiencing significant problems from gambling and a further 250,000 to 350,000 (or 1.4–2.1% of adults) experiencing moderate risks that may make them vulnerable to problem gambling.

Recent research shows that approximately one in three (30%) individuals aged 12 to 17 engage in gambling, increasing to nearly half (46%) among those aged 18 to 19. In Australia, teenagers both before and after turning 18 are more likely to gamble than to participate in any of the most popular sports for their age group.

Australia's 20 largest superannuation funds collectively held over A$14.8 billion in publicly listed igaming-related companies, according to an industry study published in mid-2026.

== Revenue ==
In 2015–16, gambling revenue made up 7.7% of state and territory taxation revenue. The rate was lowest in Western Australia (2.5%) and highest in the Northern Territory (12.0%). Gambling revenue made up 2.5% of total state revenue when other revenue sources were taken into account. The rate was lowest in WA (0.9%) and highest in Victoria (3.2%). Gambling revenue as a portion of state taxation revenue has fallen for all states and territories between 2006–07 and 2015–16.

Total Australian gambling revenue in 2008–09 was just over $19 billion and the share of household consumption was 3.1%. According to the Queensland Government the total Australian gambling market was worth over $25 billion in 2019. During the pandemic in 2020 and 2021 the proportion of online gamblers rose to 78% while half of Australians gamble on a regular basis.

Total employment in the gambling industry in Australia (thousands of people) since 1984

== Forms of gambling ==
=== Electronic gaming machines ===
Electronic gaming machines are commonly referred to within Australia as "pokies" or "poker machines". Electronic gaming machines are operated in all states of Australia as well as the Australian Capital Territory and Northern Territory. Each jurisdiction separately regulates the design and operation of electronic gaming machines. In the financial year 2020–2021, Australians placed bets worth almost AUD$150 billion through electronic gaming machines, resulting in a total player loss of AUD$12 billion for the year. Per-capita, losses for financial year 2020-2021 were AUD$608, amounting to approximately half of the AUD$1200 losses per-capita for all forms of gambling.

Australia is home to 3% of the world's pub and club poker machines, despite having only 0.3% of the global population.

Prevalence and use of electronic gaming machines within Australia
Jurisdiction	Number of machines	Number of operating venues	Total annual player turnover (FY20-21)	Player annual turnover per capita (FY20-21)	Total annual player losses	Player annual losses per capita
New South Wales	87298 (excluding casinos, June 2023)	2195 (excluding casinos, June 2023)	AUD$85.72 billion	AUD$13559	AUD$8.18 billion (excluding casinos, FY22-23)	AUD$986 (excluding casinos, FY22-23)
Northern Territory	1659 limit (excluding casinos)	75 limit (excluding casinos)	AUD$1.65 billion	AUD$8825	AUD$0.15 billion (FY20-21)	AUD$789 (FY20-21)
Queensland	21122 operating (October 2023) 23997 approved (October 2023)	351 operating (October 2023) 359 approved (October 2023)	AUD$32.34 billion	AUD$8057	AUD$3.49 billion (FY22-23)	AUD$645 (FY22-23)
South Australia	11672 (excluding Adelaide Casino, September 2023)	471 (excluding Adelaide Casino, September 2023)	AUD$8.68 billion	AUD$6087	AUD$0.92 billion (excluding Adelaide Casino, FY22-23)	AUD$497 (excluding Adelaide Casino, FY22-23)
Victoria	26380 (excluding Crown Casino, 2021–2022) 30000 limit	488 (excluding Crown Casino, 2021–2022)	AUD$17.65 billion	AUD$3420	AUD$3.02 billion (FY22-23)	AUD$446 (FY22-23)
Australian Capital Territory	3587 operating (1 November 2023) 5091 approved (1 November 2023)	46 (1 November 2023)	AUD$1.87 billion	AUD$5284	AUD$0.19 billion (FY22-23)	AUD$405 (FY22-23)
Australia (combined)			AUD$147.91 billion	AUD$7385	AUD$12.18 billion (FY20-21)	AUD$608 (FY20-21)

Regulated configuration of electronic gaming machines within Australia
Jurisdiction	Minimum long-term return to player	Maximum bet	Maximum bet frequency
New South Wales	85%	AUD$10.00	
Northern Territory	85%	AUD$5.00 (general) Unlimited (casinos)	
Queensland	85%	AUD$5.00 (general) Unlimited (casinos)	3 seconds
South Australia	87.5%	AUD$5.00 (general) Unlimited (Adelaide Casino)	
Australian Capital Territory	87%	AUD$10.00	
Victoria	85% (general) 87% (Crown Melbourne)	AUD$5.00 (general) Unlimited (Crown Melbourne)	2.14 seconds
Tasmania	87%	AUD$5.00	3 seconds
Western Australia	90%	Unlimited (Crown Perth)	

== Advertising ==
Advertising for gambling is legal in Australia. However, in 2023, a parliamentary committee recommended a ban on gambling advertising during sporting events.

In 2024, ministers of the Albanese government discussed a ban during sporting events. The government briefed lobbyists about the policy before briefing the Labor Party caucus, which inspired internal dissent, with one MP calling the move "disgusting".

The government expressed concerns over impacts to the profitability of free-to-air television. Government minister Bill Shorten expressed doubts about the ban, while Jacqui Lambie accused the government of lacking courage. In response to concerns about network profitability, the Australia Institute proposed a new levy on gambling revenue, which could cover the losses.

Polling from the Australia Institute showed that 76% of Australians favour a complete ban on gambling advertisements, phased in over a three-year period. Additionally, 81% support banning such ads on social media and online platforms, while 79% support prohibiting them in stadiums and on players' uniforms.

In April 2026, Albanese announced that the government would introduce a cap of three gambling advertisements per hour and prohibit gambling advertising on sports jerseys. Ads will be capped from 6:30 am to 8:30 pm and will be banned during school pick up and drop off times. Gambling ads will also be banned on social media unless users are over 18 and are able to opt out of these notifications. Gambling ads featuring celebrities or athletes, containing odds details, and ads at sports venues will also be banned.

== New South Wales ==
New South Wales has a long history of gambling; Australia's first official horse racing meeting occurred in 1810 at Hyde Park in Sydney; the first official Australian lottery occurred in 1881 at the Sydney Cup; and registered clubs operated the first legal poker machines in Australia from 1956.

There are approximately 95,800 "pokies" in NSW, a state total beaten only by Nevada, which operated 181,109 gambling machines in 2014.

Between 1 December 2017 and 31 May 2018 NSW Clubs made a net profit of $1,945,161,625 and hotels made a net profit of $1,169,040,731 from pokies alone.

=== Fairfield ===
Fairfield had the highest poker machine revenue in the state for 2013, generating $298 million in clubs and $93 million in pubs, from the start of the year to August. This figure is $123 million greater than the combined total of profits generated from poker machines in the City of Sydney.

=== Hunter Region ===
From January to March 2013 poker machines in the Hunter Region had a turn over of $4.5 billion, showing an increase of $500 million since 2010. Daily figures show a spend of $12.5 million, working out to be $8682 per minute. The Office of Liquor, Gaming and Racing found that Newcastle was the Hunter region's most profitable location with the 3206 poker machines averaging $44,963 each. The top five most profitable clubs for gaming revenue in the Hunter region in 2010 were:

1. Western Suburbs Leagues Club (Wests), New Lambton
2. Wests (formerly Club Phoenix), Mayfield
3. Wallsend RSL & Community Club, Wallsend
4. Belmont 16 Foot Sailing Club, Belmont
5. Cardiff Panthers, Cardiff

The top five most profitable hotels for gaming revenue in the Hunter region in 2010 were.

1. The George Tavern, East Maitland
2. Bay Hotel Motel, Bonnells Bay
3. Hotel Jesmond, Jesmond
4. The Lake Macquarie Tavern, Mount Hutton
5. Warners Bay Hotel, Warners Bay

=== Central Coast Region ===
According to the latest figures from Liquor and Gaming NSW there are 4,046 poker machines in 39 clubs on the Central Coast, and 626 poker machines in 29 hotels; making a total of 4,672 poker machines on the Central Coast. That means 2.37% of the total number of poker machines in Australia are on the NSW Central Coast.

Gosford has approximately 1928 pokies, spread across 37 venues. That is the equivalent of one poker machine for every 71 adults. In 2010–11, venues in Gosford made approximately $95,865,000 in profit from pokies. That equates to $700 for each adult member of Gosford's population.

Wyong has approximately 2608 pokies, spread across 35 venues. That is the equivalent of one poker machine for every 47 adults. In 2010–11, venues in Wyong made approximately $123,159,000 in profit from pokies. That equates to $1,000 for each adult member of Wyong's population.

The Central Coast has a higher prevalence of problem gambling than the NSW average. Young men between the ages of 18 and 24 living on the Central Coast are the biggest players of poker machines in NSW and are the highest risk group for problem gambling.

In 2008 Central Coast Gambling Help carried out a survey of 200 young people aged from 13 to 24 and found:

- 96% of people from 18 to 24 had gambled for money or possessions
- 62% of those under 14 years old and 77% of those aged up to 17 had gambled for money or items, including mobile phones and MP3 players
- 25.5% of 14- to 17-year-olds and 55% of 18- to 24-year-olds had lost more than they had intended
- and 6% under 18 had played a poker machine

== Regulatory authorities ==
Since the introduction of new gambling services, including online gambling, the Commonwealth has taken a more active role in the regulation of gambling, but the Australian gambling industry is also regulated by State and Territory authorities:

- Australian Capital Territory – ACT Gambling and Racing Commission
- New South Wales – Liquor and Gaming NSW
- Northern Territory – Licensing Commission
- Queensland – Office of Liquor and Gaming Regulation
- South Australia – Independent Gambling Authority
- Tasmania – Tasmanian Gaming Commission
- Victoria – Victorian Gambling and Casino Control Commission
- Western Australia – Department of Racing, Gaming and Liquor

== Self-regulatory government initiatives ==
In August 2023, a federal self-exclusion registry known as "BetStop" was introduced by the Australian Communications and Media Authority. All betting providers in Australia are required to verify customers against the registry, and must not allow users to create an account or receive marketing communications if a match is detected. At least 18,000 users registered within its first six months of operation. The project was first recommended by Barry O'Farrell as part of a 2015 review; it was originally intended to launch in 2022, but was delayed after the technology provider that was originally contracted to develop the registry went into administration.

== Key legislation ==
Traditionally gambling has been legislated at a state and territory level rather than by the Commonwealth:

- Australian Capital Territory
  - Betting (ACTTAB Limited) Act 1964
  - Casino Control Act 2006
  - Gaming Machine Act 2004
  - Interactive Gambling Act 1998
  - Lotteries Act 1964
  - Pool Betting Act 1964
  - Race and Sports Bookmaking Act 2001
  - Racing Act 1999
  - Unlawful Gambling Act 2009
- New South Wales
  - Betting Tax Act 2001
  - Casino Control Act 1992
  - Charitable Fundraising Act 1991
  - Gambling (Two-Up) Act 1998
  - Gaming and Liquor Administration Act 2007
  - Gaming Machines Act 2001
  - Gaming Machines Tax Act 2001
  - Liquor Act 2007
  - Lotteries and Art Unions Act 1901
  - Public Lotteries Act 1996
  - Racing Administration Act 1998
  - Registered Clubs Act 1976
  - Totalizator Act 1997
  - Unlawful Gambling Act 1998
- Northern Territory
  - Gaming Control Act 2005
  - Gaming Machine Act 2005
  - Northern Territory Licensing Commission Act 2001
  - Racing and Betting Act 2004
  - Soccer Football Pools Act 2004
  - Totalisator Licensing and Regulation Act 2004
  - Unlawful Betting Act 2004
- Queensland
  - Brisbane Casino Agreement Act 1992
  - Breakwater Island Casino Agreement Act 1984
  - Cairns Casino Agreement Act 1993
  - Casino Control Act 1982
  - Charitable and Non-Profit Gaming Act 1999
  - Gaming Machine Act 1991
  - Interactive Gambling (Player Protection) Act 1998
  - Jupiters Casino Agreement Act 1983
  - Keno Act 1996
  - Lotteries Act 1997
  - Wagering Act 1998
- South Australia
  - Authorised Betting Operations Act 2000
  - Casino Act 1997
  - Gaming Machines Act 1992
  - Lottery and Gaming Act 1936
  - State Lotteries Act 1966
- Tasmania
  - Gaming Control Act 1993
  - TT-Line Gaming Act 1993
- Victoria
  - Casino Control Act 1991
  - Casino (Management Agreement) Act 1993
  - Gambling Regulation Act 2003
- Western Australia
  - Betting Control Act 1954
  - Bookmakers Betting Levy Act 1954
  - Casino (Burswood Island) Agreement Act 1985
  - Casino Control Act 1984
  - Gaming and Betting (Contracts and Securities) Act 1985
  - Gaming and Wagering Commission Act 1987
  - Gaming and Wagering Commission (Continuing Lotteries Levy) Act 2000
  - Racing and Wagering Western Australia Act 2003
  - Racing and Wagering Western Australia Tax Act 2003
  - Racing Restriction Act 2003
  - Racing Bets Levy Act 2009

== Online gambling ==
The Interactive Gambling Act (2001) was passed by the Australian Commonwealth Parliament on 28 June 2001. It received assent on 11 July 2001

The Act is targeted at online gambling operators, making it an offense for them to offer 'real-money' online interactive gambling to residents of Australia. It also makes it illegal for online gambling operators to advertise 'real-money' interactive gambling services (such as online poker and online casinos) to Australian citizens. That being said, the amount spent on online gaming by Australians reached some $800 million by 2010, according to the official 2010 Productivity Report of the Australian Government.

Accessing and using the interactive gambling services is not an offence. It is also allowed to companies based in Australia to offer their gambling services to gamblers located outside Australia with the exception of those countries that were called 'designated countries' like Australia.

In 2022, The Australia Institute's submission to federal inquiry into online gambling called for stronger regulation of gambling-like features in video games and a comprehensive ban on gambling advertising, particularly to protect children and young people from harm.

The Australian Transaction Reports and Analysis Centre (AUSTRAC) has announced that all online gambling service providers must complete applicable customer identification procedures (ACIP) before establishing accounts or offering designated services. This requirement came into effect on September 29, 2024, and aims to prevent criminal exploitation while ensuring compliance with the National Self Exclusion Register. Companies are now obligated to verify customer identities and conduct thorough checks as part of the ACIP process prior to providing any services. Although the changes were initially introduced in September 2023, providers were given a year to adjust their systems accordingly. This new regulation significantly helps safeguard the integrity of online gambling services in Australia. in 2026 many children video games gambling functions were removed for money

== Taxation laws on gambling in Australia ==
Gamblers' winnings in Australia are not taxed. There are 3 main reasons for that:

- Gambling is not considered a profession, it is treated as a hobby or recreational activity.
- The Australian government views gains from gambling activities not as income, but as a result of good luck. Even if someone wins big, they also lose a lot in other gambling sessions.
- The government taxes gambling operators instead.

Taxation of gambling operators in Australia differs from state to state and different gambling services are taxed in a different way. There are taxes on the turnover, on player loss and net profit. As gambling operators need to obtain a licence to offer their services, certain fees must also be paid at this stage of gambling business development.

The use of different tax rates and tax bases makes it difficult to compare taxes across states. For example, the ACT's keno tax rate of 2.53% of turnover is equivalent to a tax rate on gross profits of 10.12%.

Tax rates (2015–16)

	EGMs in hotels	EGMs in clubs	EGMs in casinos	Keno	Table games in casinos (and keno in casinos in some instances)
NSW	0–50% of quarterly player loss, depending on quarterly player loss	0–28.05% of quarterly player loss, depending on quarterly player loss (the rate peaks at 28.05% for $250,000–$450,000, then falls to 18.05% before rising to a maximum of 26.55% above $5 million)	16.41–38.91% of gross revenue, depending on gross revenue, plus 2% Responsible Gambling Levy on gross gaming revenue	8.91%–14.91% of player loss, depending on player loss	16.41–38.91% of gross revenue, depending on gross revenue
Victoria	8.33–62.53% of monthly average player loss (per machine), depending on by monthly average player loss, times by the average number of machines	0–54.20% of monthly average player loss (per machine), depending on monthly average player loss, times by the average number of machines	31.57–51.57% of gross gaming revenue, depending on gross revenue, plus a 1% Community Benefit Levy	24.24% of player loss	21.25–41.25% of gross revenue, depending on gross revenue, plus 1% Community Benefit Levy
Queensland	35% of monthly taxable metered win (amount bet minus payout), plus Health Services Levy of 0–20% of monthly taxable metered win, depending on monthly metered win	0–35.00% of monthly taxable metered win, depending on monthly metered win	30% of monthly gross revenue (Gold Coast and Brisbane casinos), 20% of gross revenue (Townsville and Cairns casinos)	29.40% of monthly gross revenue, excluding casino commissions (Jupiters Casino), 20% of monthly gross revenue (Gold Coast and Brisbane casinos), 10% of gross revenue (Townsville and Cairns casinos)	20% of monthly gross revenue (Gold Coast and Brisbane casinos), 10% of gross revenue (Townsville and Cairns casinos)
Western Australia	N/A	N/A	12.42% flat rate on gross gaming revenue, plus 2% Burswood Park Levy on gross revenue	9.37% of player loss (domestic), 1.75% of player loss (international business)	9.37% (domestic), 12.92% (fully automated table games)
South Australia	0–65% of annual net gambling revenue, depending on annual net gambling revenue		Up to 41% of net gambling revenue	41% of net gambling revenue	3.41% of net gambling revenue (table games), 10.91% of net gambling revenue (fully automated table games)
Tasmania	25.88% of gross profit, plus 4% Community Support Levy		25.88% on gross profit	5.88% of gross profit	0.88% of annual gross profit
Northern Territory	12.91–42.91% of monthly gross profits		11% of gross profit (Lasseters Casino), 15% of gross profit (Skycity Darwin Casino), plus a 10% Community Benefit Levy	10% of gross profit, reduced by the GST amount	The GST rate only
Australian Capital Territory	25.9% of gross monthly revenue, plus 0.6% Problem Gambling Assistance Fund Levy		10.9% of gross revenue	2.53% of turnover	

Major forms of gambling taxation by gambling type
Forms of taxation	Gambling Activity
Turnover tax	Bookmakers (racing)
	Bookmakers (sports betting)
	Totalisator wagering on racing
	Lottery subscriptions
	Draw card machines
	Keno
Tax on player loss	Totalisator wagering on racing
	Sports betting
	Poker machines in hotels, clubs, casinos
	Casinos
	TAB sports betting
	Keno
Net profits tax	Poker machines
	Off-course totalisator investment
Licence Fees	Casinos
	Poker machines
	Lotteries
	Racing
	Bookmakers
	Sports betting
	Minor gambling (bingo, raffles)

== See also ==
- Federal Hotels – Private family company in Tasmania, Australia
- Australian Taxation Office – Australian revenue collection body
- Wrest Point Hotel Casino – Hotel and casino complex in Hobart, Tasmania
- Crown Resorts – Australian gambling and hospitality company
- Star Entertainment Group – Australian resort and casino company
- Palmerbet – Australian online gambling platform
