= Greg Veivers =

Australian former professional rugby league footballer

Personal information
- Full name: Gregory Veivers
- Born: 22 September 1949 (age 77) Beaudesert, Queensland, Australia

Playing information
- Height: 183 cm (6 ft 0 in)
- Weight: 93 kg (14 st 9 lb)
- Position: Prop
Club
Years	Team	Pld	T	G	FG	P
1968–79	Souths (Brisbane)
1972–7?	Huddersfield
	Total	0	0	0	0	0
Representative
Years	Team	Pld	T	G	FG	P
1978–83	Queensland	18				6
1975–77	Australia	7	1	0	0	3
- Relatives: Phil Veivers (brother); Josh Veivers (nephew); Mick Veivers (cousin); Tom Veivers (cousin); Wayne Bennett (brother-in-law)

Greg Veivers (born 22 September 1949) is an Australian former rugby league footballer who captained Australia in a Rugby League World Cup match in 1977. He represented Australia in seven World Cup matches from 1975 and 1977. He was a front-rower and a regular Queensland state representative from 1970 to 1978.

== Background and early life ==
Veivers was born in Beaudesert, Queensland, Australia. He came from a prominent sporting family. His father, Jack Veivers, played rugby league for Souths Brisbane and represented Queensland. His cousins included Mick Veivers, who represented Australia in rugby league during the 1960s, and Tom Veivers, who played Test cricket for the Australian cricket team.

His brother, Phil, played 400 first-grade rugby league matches in England for St Helens during the 1980s, and later coached Huddersfield and Bradford. His sister, Trish was married to rugby league coach Wayne Bennett.

== Rugby league career ==
After playing rugby at school in Toowoomba, Veivers joined the Souths Brisbane colts team in 1967 and made his first-grade debut in 1968. He spent his entire Brisbane first-grade career with Souths. He also had a spell in England with Huddersfield, where he played alongside fellow Queenslander and future brother-in-law Wayne Bennett.

Veivers was selected as a reserve for Queensland in the first interstate match against New South Wales in 1970. Before the advent of State of Origin, Queensland players who moved to Sydney club football were generally no longer eligible to represent their home state. Veivers remained in Brisbane and became a regular representative for Queensland, making 16 appearances between 1970 and 1978. He was appointed captain of Queensland in 1974.

He was selected for Australia in the 1975 World Series and played in teams captained by Graeme Langlands, John Brass and Arthur Beetson. During the 1977 World Series, hosted by Australia and New Zealand and contested with Great Britain and France, Veivers captained Australia in a 27–12 victory over New Zealand.

Veivers represented Queensland again in 1978, but did not play for Australia after 1977. A blood clot that he had suffered in a midweek game in 1975 recurred in 1979, forcing his retirement.

== Later life ==
While playing, Veivers operated an insurance business in Brisbane which he continued after his playing career. He served for 10 years on the Queensland coaching and development panel, and was also a selector for the Queensland Super League team in the mid-1990s.

== Matches played ==
Team	Matches	Years
Souths Brisbane	unknown	1968–1979
Queensland	16	1970–1978
Australia (World Cup)	7	1975–1977

== Sources ==
- Whiticker, Alan (2004) Captaining the Kangaroos, New Holland, Sydney
- Queensland Representatives at qrl.com.au

Preceded by John Brass	Australian national rugby league captain 1977	Succeeded by Greg Pierce
