= Office of Liquor and Gaming Regulation =

Queensland government agency

The Office of Liquor and Gaming Regulation is an agency of the Queensland Government's Department of Justice responsible for regulating the liquor, gaming and adult entertainment industries in Queensland.

The Minister responsible for Liquor and Gaming in the Queensland Parliament is the Honourable Deb Frecklington MP, Minister for Justice and Attorney-General.

== See also ==
- Alcohol in Australia
- Gambling in Australia
- List of Queensland Government departments
