= Electoral district of Ashgrove =

Former state electoral district of Queensland, Australia

Ashgrove Queensland—Legislative Assembly
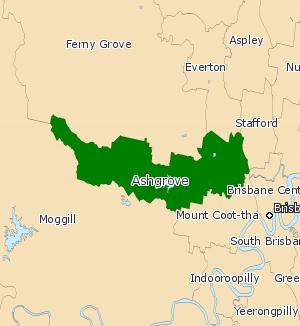
- Ashgrove (2008—2017)
- State: Queensland
- Dates current: 1960–2017
- MP: Several
- Party: Labor (4 times); Liberal (3 times); Liberal National (once)
- Namesake: Ashgrove
- Electors: 33,278 (2015)
- Area: 68.9 km^{2} (26.6 sq mi)
- Coordinates: 27°25′S 152°54′E

Ashgrove was a Legislative Assembly of Queensland electoral district in the state of Queensland, Australia from 1960 to 2017.

It was located in the northern suburbs of Brisbane, encompassing Alderley, Ashgrove, Enoggera, The Gap and Newmarket. The electorate also contained the Enoggera Army Barracks and the Enoggera Reservoir, a state forest.

In the 2012 state election LNP leader Campbell Newman won the seat, and following his party's success in that election became Premier. In the 2015 election, Kate Jones, who had held the seat for Labor from 2006 to 2012, reclaimed the seat. In losing his seat and the Premiership, Newman became just the second Premier in Queensland history to be defeated in his electorate.

Ashgrove was abolished in the 2017 electoral redistribution, mostly being replaced by Cooper.

== Members ==
Member	Party	Term
Douglas Tooth	Liberal	1960–1974
John Greenwood	Liberal	1974–1983
Tom Veivers	Labor	1983–1986
Alan Sherlock	Liberal	1986–1989
Jim Fouras	Labor	1989–2006
Kate Jones	Labor	2006–2012
Campbell Newman	Liberal National	2012–2015
Kate Jones	Labor	2015–2017

== 2015 election results ==
2015 Queensland state election: Ashgrove
Party	Candidate	Votes	%	±%
Labor	Kate Jones	13,372	44.45	+7.85
Liberal National	Campbell Newman	13,125	43.63	−8.18
Greens	Robert Hogg	3,047	10.13	+0.96
Independent	Connie Cicchini	279	0.93	+0.39
Independent	Peter Jeremijenko	261	0.87	+0.33
Total formal votes		30,084	98.97	−0.25
Informal votes		313	1.03	+0.25
Turnout		30,397	91.34	−1.06
Two-party-preferred result
Labor	Kate Jones	16,009	54.25	+9.95
Liberal National	Campbell Newman	13,498	45.75	−9.95
Labor gain from Liberal National		Swing	+9.95	

== Polling ==
Ashgrove polling
Date	Poll	TPP vote
		ALP	LNP
2015 election		54.3%	45.7%
27 January 2015	ReachTEL	54%	46%
13 January 2015	ReachTEL	53%	47%
28 September 2014	ReachTEL	56%	44%
4 September 2014	ReachTEL	58%	42%
22 July 2014	ReachTEL	53%	47%
26 March 2014	ReachTEL	54%	46%
14 February 2014	Galaxy	53%	47%
27 November 2013	ReachTEL	52%	48%
6 August 2012	ReachTEL	51.5%	48.5%
2012 election		44.3%	55.7%
21 March 2012	ReachTEL	48.7%	51.3%
5 March 2012	ReachTEL	51.5%	48.5%
9 February 2012	ReachTEL	49%	51%
11 January 2012	ReachTEL	45.2%	54.8%
8 December 2011	ReachTEL	45.4%	54.6%
7 November 2011	ReachTEL	46%	54%
5 October 2011	ReachTEL	43.5%	56.5%
6 September 2011	ReachTEL	48%	52%
Jul 2011	Newspoll	45%	55%
May 2011	ReachTEL	50.1%	49.9%
May 2011	LNP	47%	53%
2009 election		57.1%	42.9%
