= Douglas Tooth =

Australian politician

The Honourable Sir Douglas Tooth

Member of the Queensland Legislative Assembly for Kelvin Grove
- In office 3 August 1957 – 28 May 1960
- Preceded by: Bert Turner
- Succeeded by: Seat abolished

Member of the Queensland Legislative Assembly for Ashgrove
- In office 28 May 1960 – 7 December 1974
- Preceded by: New seat
- Succeeded by: John Greenwood

Personal details
- Born: Seymour Douglas Tooth; 28 January 1904 Barcaldine, Queensland, Australia
- Died: 3 July 1982 (aged 78) Brisbane, Queensland, Australia
- Party: Liberal Party
- Education: University of Queensland
- Occupation: Teacher

Sir Seymour Douglas Tooth (28 January 1904 – 3 July 1982) was a politician in Queensland, Australia. He was a Member of the Queensland Legislative Assembly.

== Politics ==
Tooth was unsuccessful in contesting the 1956 election in the electoral district of Kelvin Grove as the candidate for the Liberal Party. He was defeated by the sitting Labor member, Bert Turner who had held the seat since 1941.

Tooth was elected to the Queensland Legislative Assembly in Kelvin Grove at the 1957 election, defeating Turner. Tooth held Kelvin Grove until 1960, at which that electorate was abolished being largely replaced by the new electoral district of Ashgrove. He successfully contested Ashgrove which he held until the 1974 election which he did not contest. The Liberal party retained Ashgrove in 1974, with the election of their candidate John Greenwood.

He was the Minister for Health from 14 April 1964 to 23 December 1974. He was knighted in 1975.

Parliament of Queensland
Preceded by Bert Turner	Member for Kelvin Grove; 1957–1960	Abolished
New seat	Member for Ashgrove; 1960–1974	Succeeded by John Greenwood
