= Lilian Violet Cooper =

British Australian medical doctor (1861–1947)

Lilian Violet Cooper MBBS, MS, FRACS
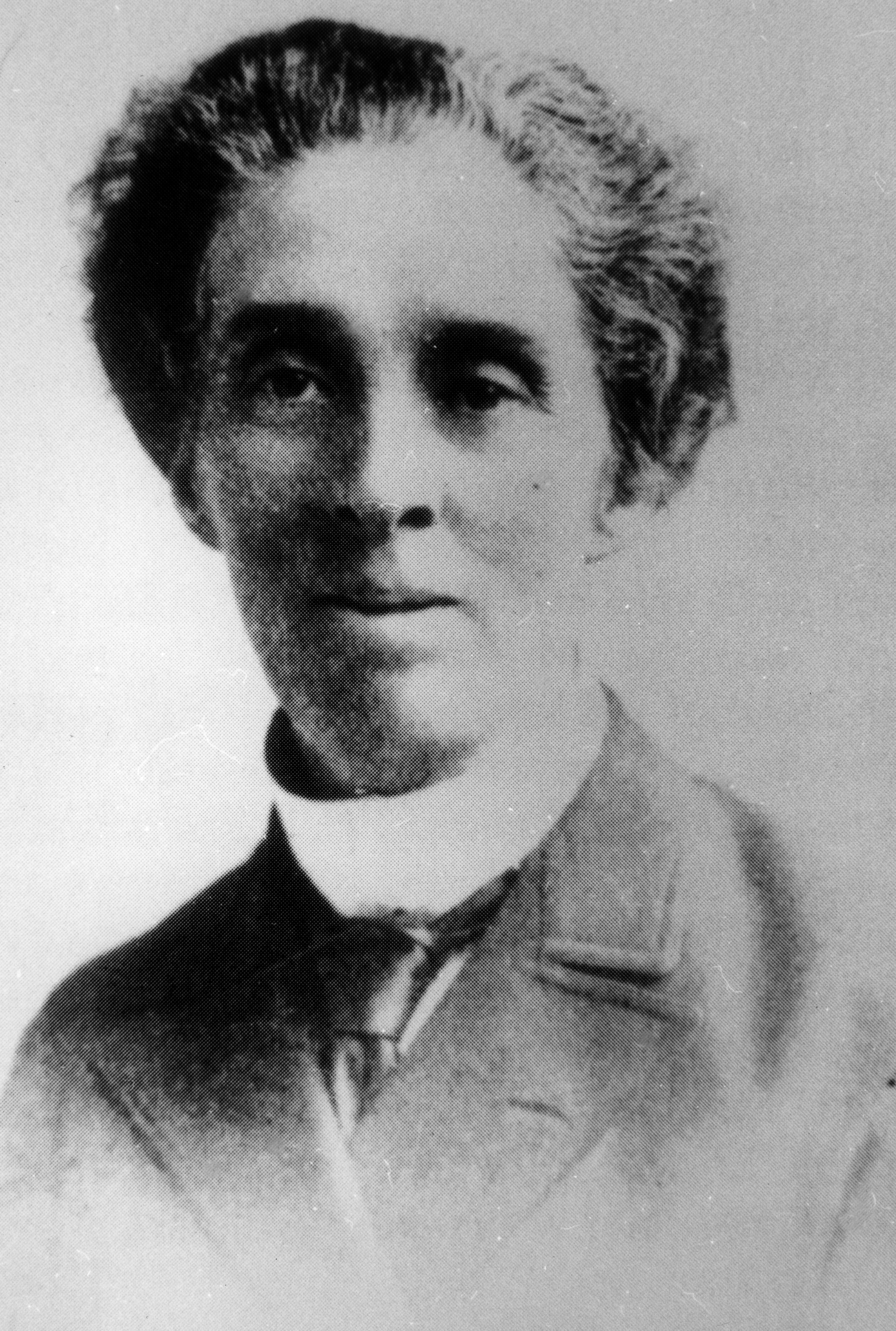
- Born: 11 August 1861; Chatham, Kent
- Died: 18 August 1947 (aged 86); Brisbane, Queensland
- Education: London School of Medicine for Women; Royal College of Physicians, Edinburgh; Royal College of Surgeons Edinburgh; Faculty of Physicians and Surgeons Glasgow
- Occupation: Surgeon
- Medical career
- Profession: Surgeon

Lilian Violet Cooper (11 August 1861 – 18 August 1947 Brisbane) was a British-born medical practitioner in Queensland, Australia. She was the first woman medical doctor registered in Queensland.

== Early life and education ==
Lilian Cooper was born in Chatham, Kent on 11 August 1861, to parents Henry Fallowfield Cooper, a captain in the Royal Marines, and his wife Elizabeth Shewell. She chose to study medicine at the London School of Medicine for Women in 1886. After completing the course in October 1890 she qualified as a doctor at the Royal College of Physicians, Edinburgh, studying also at the Royal College of Surgeons, Edinburgh, and the Faculty of Physicians and Surgeons, Glasgow.

== Early career ==
On completing her education at the London School of Medicine for Women, in 1892, Cooper sailed for Brisbane with Mary Josephine Bedford. In June 1891, Cooper applied for registration with the Medical Board of Queensland, becoming the first woman doctor registered in Queensland and the second in Australia. Cooper began her professional career in Brisbane with Dr Booth at his general practice in South Brisbane. However, after 6 months of working with Booth who was, reportedly, inebriated for much of the time, Cooper terminated her agreement with him and set up her own practice. Her actions raised the ire of Brisbane's then (all male) medical establishment who shunned her professionally until 1893 when she was finally admitted as a member of the Queensland Medical Society. She commenced her own practice at The Mansions in George Street in 1893, making house calls in her horse and sulky initially, a bicycle and then in her much-loved motorcar. Cooper then worked at the Hospital for Sick Children and the Lady Lamington Hospital for Women in Brisbane, before joining the Mater Misericordiae Hospital in 1905.

Cooper returned to England in 1911 and was awarded a doctorate of medicine by the University of Durham in June 1912. During this period she travelled in the United States and visited Johns Hopkins Hospital in Maryland and Mayo Clinic in Minnesota.

== First World War ==
Order of Saint Sava - Ribbon bar

During World War I, Cooper volunteered with the Scottish Women's Hospital Service after she was turned down by the Australian Army as female doctors were not wanted. She served on the front line in France, Macedonia and Serbia and was in charge of the ambulance division, with all female drivers (including her friend Mary Josephine Bedford). Operating in tents close to the front line, Cooper was later awarded the Order of St Sava from the Serbian King for her wartime efforts.

== Post war ==
After World War I, Cooper and Bedford returned to Brisbane in 1918, later taking up residence in the St Mary’s rectory, Kangaroo Point. Cooper became a Foundation Fellow of the Royal Australasian College of Surgeons in 1928 and Founder of the Queensland Medical Women's Society.

== Later life ==
Cooper retired in 1941. She died at Brisbane on 18 August 1947 and is buried next to her long-time companion Mary Josephine Bedford at Toowong Cemetery, Brisbane, Queensland, Australia.

== Legacy ==
The electoral district of Cooper, created in the 2017 Queensland state electoral redistribution and the Lilian Cooper Medical Centre in Spring Hill and both named after Lilian Cooper.

In 2020, the State Library of Queensland produced an episode on Lilian Cooper and her life achievements for their Dangerous Women Podcast series.

== See also ==
- Other notable women volunteers in the Scottish Women's Hospitals for Foreign Service
- Women in World War I
- Australian women in World War I
- The Serbian campaign (1914-1915)
