= Jim Fouras =

Australian politician (1938–2021)

The Honourable Jim Fouras AM
- Portrait, circa 1976

Speaker of the Legislative Assembly of Queensland
- In office 27 February 1990 – 2 April 1996
- Preceded by: Kev Lingard
- Succeeded by: Neil Turner

Member of the Queensland Parliament for South Brisbane
- In office 12 November 1977 – 1 November 1986
- Preceded by: Colin Lamont
- Succeeded by: Anne Warner

Member of the Queensland Parliament for Ashgrove
- In office 2 December 1989 – 9 September 2006
- Preceded by: Alan Sherlock
- Succeeded by: Kate Jones

Personal details
- Born: Demetrios Fouras; 8 March 1938 Kalavryta, Greece
- Died: 12 November 2021 (aged 83) Brisbane, Queensland, Australia
- Party: Labor
- Education: University of Queensland
- Occupation: Chemist

Demetrios "Jim" Fouras, AM (8 March 1938 – 12 November 2021) was an Australian politician. He was Speaker of the Legislative Assembly of Queensland.

== Early life ==
Born in Manesi, Kalavryta, Greece, he migrated to Queensland at the age of ten with his brother. His knowledge of English was poor and he knew less than 100 words. He received his secondary education at The Southport School and was awarded the school's chemistry prize. He attended the University of Queensland and graduated with a Bachelor of Science (1963) and a Bachelor of Economics (1972). Fouras was a research chemist and then a marketing economist with the Department of Primary Industries.

== Politics ==
In 1977, Fouras was elected to the Legislative Assembly of Queensland as the Labor member for South Brisbane. He held the seat until 1986, when he was defeated for preselection by Anne Warner. He returned to the Assembly in 1989, winning the seat of Ashgrove, which he held until his retirement in 2006. Fouras was Speaker of the Legislative Assembly from 1990 to 1996. He is noted for being the first Greek-Australian to serve as speaker of an Australian parliament.

Fouras' tenure as Speaker would have ended earlier in 1995 when he was not renominated by the Labor caucus as its candidate for Speaker, choosing instead Henry Palaszczuk. The party had just been re-elected to government at the 1995 Queensland state election with a one-seat majority.

The dumping of Fouras as Speaker by his ALP colleagues raised the prospect of him being re-elected with the support of the Coalition, as he would have had the numbers to beat Palaszczuk on the floor of Parliament.

Fearing that outcome, the ALP withdrew Palaszczuk's candidacy for Speaker and Fouras was re-elected with the support of his ALP colleagues. Upon his re-election as Speaker, the Coalition claimed that even if the ALP had not reversed its decision on Fouras, he would have been re-elected over Palaszczuk, not just with the support of the Coalition but also some ALP MPs. The claim that some ALP members would have broken the party line to support Fouras has been disputed by the ALP.

During this renewed tenure as Speaker, Independent Liz Cunningham mostly sided with the Coalition in parliamentary votes. With the government having a one-seat majority, on those occasions Fouras as Speaker had to use his casting vote in order for the government to win the division. Fouras' casting vote had not been required previously because before the 1995 election the Government had had a 19-seat majority.

In February 1996, the ALP lost its one-seat majority after the loss of the Mundingburra by-election and the Goss Government resigned its commission. Fouras likewise resigned as Speaker.

He remained involved in politics, campaigning for Jonty Bush in 2021.

== Personal life ==
Fouras married Maria, with whom he had three children Yanoula, Athanasi and Andreas. Fouras later married Tanya. Fouras died from a heart attack on 12 November 2021 at the age of 83 in Brisbane, Queensland.

Parliament of Queensland
Preceded by Kev Lingard	Speaker of the Legislative Assembly; 1990–1996	Succeeded by Neil Turner
Preceded by Colin Lamont	Member for South Brisbane; 1977–1986	Succeeded by Anne Warner
Preceded by Alan Sherlock	Member for Ashgrove; 1989–2006	Succeeded by Kate Jones
