= Mick Veivers =

Australia international rugby league footballer and politician

Mick Veivers AM

Member of the Queensland Legislative Assembly for Southport
- In office 12 June 1987 – 17 February 2001
- Preceded by: Doug Jennings
- Succeeded by: Peter Lawlor

Personal details
- Born: Michael Desmond Veivers; 12 August 1939 (age 87) Southport, Queensland, Australia
- Party: National Party
- Occupation: International footballer, TV commentator, Farmer
- Rugby league career

Playing information
- Position: Second-row
Club
Years	Team	Pld	T	G	FG	P
1965–69	Manly Warringah	66	5	0	1	17
Representative
Years	Team	Pld	T	G	FG	P
1962–66	Australia	6	0	0	0	0
- As of 13 February 2021
- Relatives: Phil Veivers (cousin); Tom Veivers (cousin)

Michael Desmond Veivers AM (born 12 August 1939) was the Member for Southport from 1987 to 2001 and was Minister for Emergency Services and Sport in the Borbidge Government. He had previously been a Rugby League international.

== Early life and education ==
Veivers was born at Southport in Queensland, Australia. He attended St. Joseph's Nudgee College.

== Career ==
Veivers played football in the Brisbane Rugby League premiership for the Souths Magpies and represented Queensland and Australia. He also played in Sydney for the Manly-Warringah Sea Eagles. His cousin, Greg Veivers, was also a rugby league international. Another cousin, Tom Veivers, represented Australia in cricket and also became a Queensland politician.

Political offices
Preceded by Doug Jennings	Member for Southport; 1987–2001	Succeeded by Peter Lawlor
Preceded by Ken Davies	Queensland Minister for Emergency Services; 1996–1998	Succeeded by Stephen Robertson
Preceded by Bob Gibbs	Queensland Minister for Sport; 1996–1998	Succeeded by Bob Gibbs
