= Alan Sherlock =

Australian politician

Member of the Queensland Legislative Assembly for Ashgrove
- In office 1 November 1986 – 2 December 1989
- Preceded by: Tom Veivers
- Succeeded by: Jim Fouras

Personal details
- Born: Alan Frederick Sherlock; 7 June 1938 Rockhampton, Queensland, Australia
- Died: 11 December 2016 (aged 78) Brisbane, Queensland, Australia
- Party: Liberal Party
- Spouse: Glenda Doris Goodson (m. 1960)
- Education: University of Queensland
- Occupation: Pharmacist

Alan Frederick Sherlock OBE, OAM (7 June 1938 – 11 December 2016) was an Australian politician.

A former Scout Commissioner, Sherlock was elected to the Legislative Assembly of Queensland in 1986 as the Liberal member for Ashgrove serving one term before his defeat in 1989. He subsequently contested the federal seat of Petrie unsuccessfully in 1993.

In January 2014, Sherlock was awarded the Medal of the Order of Australia (OAM) in the General Division for service to the Scouting movement and to the community. He died on 11 December 2016 at the age of 78.

== Community ==
Alan Sherlock was appointed Board Director of the Duke of Edinburgh's International Award, Queensland, Australia (1998-2004) and Acting Chair and Chair (2004-2005).

He was appointed as the Chief Commissioner of the Scout Association of Australia (Queensland Branch) from 1981 to 1986. The Chairman of the Queensland International Youth Year for 1985. The Councillor of the Pharmaceutical Society of Queensland from 1962 to 1965. He was active in the Pharmacy Guild of Australia, Queensland Branch, since 1979. He was a patron of the Red Cross (The Gap branch) and the Deputy Chairman for Queensland Year of Parents in 1986.

Parliament of Queensland
Preceded by Tom Veivers	Member for Ashgrove; 1986–1989	Succeeded by Jim Fouras
