= John Greenwood (Australian politician) =

Australian politician (1934–2023)

The Honourable John Greenwood QC

Member of the Queensland Legislative Assembly for Ashgrove
- In office 7 December 1974 – 22 Oct 1983
- Preceded by: Doug Tooth
- Succeeded by: Tom Veivers

Personal details
- Born: John Ward Greenwood; 29 April 1934 Kingsford, New South Wales, Australia
- Died: 23 December 2023 (aged 89) Brisbane, Queensland, Australia
- Party: Liberal Party
- Spouse: Barbara Mary Ellen Conrad
- Education: University of Queensland
- Occupation: Barrister

John Ward Greenwood (29 April 1934 – 23 December 2023) was an Australian politician who was a member of the Queensland Legislative Assembly.

== Biography ==
John Ward Greenwood was born in Kingsford, New South Wales, the son of Albert Francis Greenwood and his wife Lila (née Ward). He was educated at various state schools across Queensland, New South Wales, and Victoria before attending Church of England Grammar School. He then graduated from the University of Queensland with a Bachelor of Arts in 1957 and a Bachelor of Laws in 1958.

Greenwood was admitted to the bar in 1958 and the next year was practicing as a barrister until 1976. He was also a part-time lecturer in commercial law 1962-1965 and a captain in Reserve Army Legal Corps.

Greenwood married Barbara Mary Ellen Conrad and together had a son and two daughters.

Greenwood died in Brisbane on 23 December 2023, at the age of 89.

== Public career ==
Greenwood took over the seat of Ashgrove from the retiring fellow Liberal, Doug Tooth, at the 1974 Queensland state election. He held Ashgrove until the state election in 1983, when he was defeated by the former international cricketer, Tom Veivers of the Labor Party.

He held many roles whilst in politics including:

- Minister for Survey, Valuation, Urban and Regional Affairs 1976-1977
- Minister for Survey and Valuation 1977-1980
- Member of the select committee on Subordinate Legislation 1975-1976
- Queensland Representative on the Australian Parliamentary Delegation to Canada 1976
- Delegate to the Australian Constitutional Convention 1976
- Member of the select committee on Privileges 1980
- Member of the Parliamentary Refreshment Rooms Committee 1980
- Member of the Parliamentary delegation to Asia 1981
- Delegate-elect to the Constitutional Convention 1983

Parliament of Queensland
Preceded by Doug Tooth	Member for Ashgrove; 1974–1983	Succeeded by Tom Veivers
