= Electoral district of Cooper =

State electoral district of Queensland, Australia

Cooper Queensland—Legislative Assembly
- Map of Cooper, 2017
- State: Queensland
- Dates current: 2017–present
- MP: Jonty Bush
- Party: Labor Party
- Namesake: Lilian Violet Cooper
- Electors: 37,386 (2020)
- Area: 63 km^{2} (24.3 sq mi)
- Demographic: Outer-metropolitan
- Coordinates: 27.4462°S 152.9353°E
Electorates around Cooper:
Pine Rivers	Ferny Grove	Stafford
Moggill	Cooper	McConnel
Moggill	Maiwar	South Brisbane

Cooper is an electoral district of the Legislative Assembly in the Australian state of Queensland. It was created in the 2017 redistribution, and was won at that year's state election by Labor's Kate Jones. It was named after pioneer doctor Lilian Violet Cooper.

It largely covers the areas of the abolished electorate of Ashgrove. Located in Northern Brisbane, it consists of the suburbs of Enoggera Reservoir, The Gap, Bardon, Ashgrove, Red Hill, Paddington and Milton.

== Members for Cooper ==
Member	Party	Term
Kate Jones	Labor	2017–2020
Jonty Bush	Labor	2020–present

== Election results ==
2024 Queensland state election: Cooper
Party	Candidate	Votes	%	±%
Labor	Jonty Bush	12,941	37.17	+3.07
Liberal National	Raewyn Bailey	11,889	34.15	+0.71
Greens	Katinka Winston-Allom	8,878	25.50	−4.13
One Nation	Susan Ventnor	746	2.14	+0.40
Family First	Donna Gallehawk	361	1.04	+1.04
Total formal votes		34,815	98.23	−0.47
Informal votes		627	1.77	+0.47
Turnout		35,442	91.74	+0.29
Two-party-preferred result
Labor	Jonty Bush	21,296	61.17	+0.68
Liberal National	Raewyn Bailey	13,519	38.83	−0.68
Labor hold		Swing	+0.68	

== See also ==
- Electoral districts of Queensland
- Members of the Queensland Legislative Assembly by year
- Category:Members of the Queensland Legislative Assembly by name
