= Josh Veivers =

Australian professional rugby league footballer

Personal information
- Full name: Joshua Veivers
- Born: 19 December 1989 (age 36) England
- Height: 1.81 m (5 ft 11 in)
- Weight: 84 kg (13 st 3 lb)

Playing information
- Position: Fullback, Wing
Club
Years	Team	Pld	T	G	FG	P
	Wigan Warriors
2010(loan)	→ Whitehaven	8	1	0	0	4
2011(loan)	→ Wakefield Trinity Wildcats	14	4	33	0	82
2012	Salford City Reds	6	3	0	0	12
	Total	28	8	33	0	98
- Source: As of 3 December 2017
- Father: Phil Veivers
- Relatives: Greg Veivers (uncle)

Joshua Veivers is a professional rugby league player, who was last contracted to Salford City Reds in the Super League. The son of former St. Helens player, and Salford City Reds coach Phil Veivers, Josh Veivers joined the Wakefield Trinity Wildcats from Wigan Warriors, where he made no first team appearances, only playing in their academy. He made his first team début in 2011's Super League XVI, playing at his preferred position of fullback in a 20-40 loss to Castleford Tigers, where he kicked two goals from four attempts. He then played for Salford the following year.

Since 2015, Veivers has played for Australian Country Rugby League team the Darlington Point-Coleambally Roosters, who play in the Group 20 competition.
