= Tom Veivers =

Australian cricketer

Thomas Robert Veivers
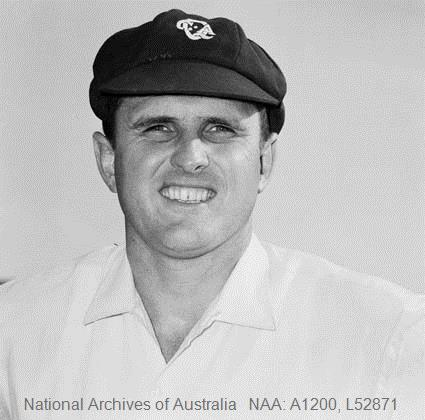
- Veivers in 1965

Member of the Queensland Legislative Assembly for Ashgrove
- In office 22 October 1983 – 1 November 1986
- Preceded by: John Greenwood
- Succeeded by: Alan Sherlock

Personal details
- Born: 6 April 1937 (age 89) Beenleigh, Queensland, Australia
- Party: Labor
- Spouse: Robyn Stutterd (m. 1960)
- Relations: Mick Veivers (cousin); Greg Veivers (cousin); Jack Wildermuth (great nephew)
- Occupation: Teacher
- Cricket career

Cricket information
- Batting: Left-handed
- Bowling: Right-arm offbreak

International information
- National side: Australia
- Test debut (cap 226): 6 December 1964 v South Africa
- Last Test: 29 February 1967 v South Africa

Career statistics
Competition	Test	First-class
Matches	21	106
Runs scored	813	5,100
Batting average	31.26	36.95
100s/50s	0/7	4/37
Top score	88	137
Balls bowled	4,191	18,548
Wickets	33	191
Bowling average	41.66	38.70
5 wickets in innings	0	3
10 wickets in match	0	0
Best bowling	4/68	5/63
Catches/stumpings	7/–	52/–
- Source: , 10 October 2021

Thomas Robert Veivers (born 6 April 1937) is an Australian former cricketer, teacher, politician and public administrator who played in 21 cricket Test matches between 1963 and 1967. He is the great-uncle of Jack Wildermuth.

== Cricket career ==
Veivers was an all-rounder who bowled right-arm off-spin and batted left-handed. Educated at Downlands College, in Toowoomba in southeastern Queensland, he attended the University of Queensland, whom he represented in club cricket. In 1955, playing for Downlands College in a match against Gregory Terrace at the Brisbane Oval, he scored 155 runs. He was made the captain of the Queensland Colts and scored 126 against the New South Wales Colts in 1958/59, their first win in the interstate Gregory Cup in 8 years.

He made his first-class debut in 1958–59 against the touring English cricket team and made his Sheffield Shield debut that season also. He did not command a regular spot in the Sheffield Shield team until the following season. He was selected for his first Australian squad in 1962, playing in an Australian XI against the visiting English team, in which he was hit for two sixes by Ted Dexter in his opening over.

John Woodcock of The Times wrote: "I doubt if it is possible to hit a cricket ball any harder than Dexter did today. Melbourne is a huge ground and no one who hits a six here is likely to forget it. Against Veivers, an off-spinner, Dexter twice cleared the sightscreen, once by a good 20 yards." In the 2 matches against the MCC, his figures were 3 wickets for 310 and he was considered for the Test matches.

Veivers was selected for the Test team the following season to make his debut against South Africa in the First Test in Brisbane, in which he scored 14 batting at number 8 and took 1/48. He was omitted for the third and fourth Tests, but managed to defy the South Africans with stubborn batting in the fifth Test in Sydney, salvaging a draw. He toured England in 1964, playing all Tests and scoring two half-centuries and three three-wicket hauls. He followed this with 2 more half-centuries and a career-best of 4/68 on the tour to India. While scoring 74 in Chennai he hit Bapu Nadkarni, often considered an unhittable bowler, for 3 sixes.

He scored his Test best of 88 against Pakistan in Australia the following season but was unavailable to tour the West Indies in 1965 for personal reasons. He had a difficult 1965-66 Ashes series back home against England, taking just four wickets and one half-century. He went on the 1966-67 tour of South Africa, which was his last international representation for Australia. He retired from first-class cricket the following year.

His bowling was economical but not penetrative, with a Test average of over 40. He bowled one of the longest known bowling spells in Test cricket - 55 six-ball overs in England's innings of 611 at Old Trafford in 1964. Veivers bowled 75 of the last 80 overs delivered from the City end and finished with figures of 95.1-36-155-3. This is the highest number of balls bowled in an innings of a Test match by an Australian and included a single unbroken spell of 51 overs and one ball. Veivers was the non-striker when Simpson reached the 300 and, one Test later, when Fred Trueman took his 300th wicket by dismissing Neil Hawke.

== Later career ==
Veivers was a Brisbane radio station executive before serving as the secretary of the Queensland Cricket Association from 1974 to 1977 and a state selector from 1977 to 1982.

He had a brief political career, holding the seat of Ashgrove in the Legislative Assembly of Queensland from 1983 to 1986 for the Labor Party. He was Commissioner-General of the Australian Pavilion at World Expo 88 in Brisbane in 1988. He was Chairman of the Queensland Institute of Medical Research Trust from 1991 to 2000 and was appointed a Fellow of the Institute in 2000.

He was the president of the QCA from 1989 to 1992. He was made a Life Member of Queensland Cricket in 2006.

His cousins, Mick and Greg Veivers, represented Australia at rugby league, Greg captaining the national team. Mick went on to become a Queensland state politician. Tom's great-nephew, Jack Wildermuth, has played Twenty20 International (T20I) cricket for Australia.

Parliament of Queensland
Preceded by John Greenwood	Member for Ashgrove; 1983–1986	Succeeded by Alan Sherlock
