= Jonty Bush =

Australian politician

Jonty Bush MP

Member of the Queensland Legislative Assembly for Cooper
- Incumbent
- Assumed office 31 October 2020
- Preceded by: Kate Jones

Personal details
- Born: Jonty Maree Bush; 25 June 1979 (age 47) Austins Ferry, Tasmania, Australia
- Party: Labor
- Children: 1
- Education: Griffith University; University of the Sunshine Coast
- Occupation: Public servant; community advocate
- Website: www.jontybush.com

Jonty Maree Bush (born 25 June 1979) is an Australian politician, and the Labor state member for Cooper in the Queensland Legislative Assembly. Bush is a former public servant and community advocate, having been the CEO of the Queensland Homicide Victims Support Group.

She was the 2009 Young Australian of the Year for her advocacy for victims of crime and the development of the One Punch Can Kill campaign.

== Early life ==
Bush was born in Austins Ferry, Tasmania in 1979, and relocated with her family to the Southern Burnett town of Kilkivan when she was 14 and completed high school between Kilkivan and Gympie. Bush, her father and brother relocated to the Sunshine Coast where Bush attended Sunshine Coast University to earn a bachelor's degree in business. Bush later graduated from Griffith University with a master's in criminology and criminal justice.

Bush joined the Queensland Homicide Victims Support Group in 2000 as a volunteer after the homicides of her sister (to domestic violence) and her father (a coward punch assault). During her time with the company, Bush was promoted to Family Support Officer, Volunteer Coordinator and eventually to chief executive officer in 2007, making her the first CEO with lived experience in the organisation.

Bush led a number of policy and legislative reforms to strengthen the rights of victims of crime in Queensland. Additionally, Bush initiated an anti-violence campaign called One Punch Can Kill, educating people about the impacts of even one punch. In 2012, Bush started Project 24, which focuses on fundraising for agencies that specialise in gender-based violence prevention.

From 2010 to 2020 Bush worked in the Queensland Public Service, including at Victim Assist Queensland, the Office of the Public Guardian, and the Department of Premier and Cabinet. She was also a member of the Queensland Sentencing Advisory Council from 2010 to 2012.

== Political career ==
Bush was elected a vice-president of Queensland Labor in 2020, and is Patron of two internal party groups, the Labor Environmental Action Network and Labor Enabled.

At the 2020 Brisbane City Council election, Bush ran for the Enoggera Ward and was defeated by incumbent councillor Andrew Wines, despite a swing towards her.

=== State Parliament ===
Bush was selected as the Labor candidate for Cooper at the 2020 Queensland state election, following the retirement of Kate Jones. She was successful and won the seat with a 10.5% margin. During her term, Bush served as a member of four parliamentary committees including the Community Safety and Legal Affairs Committee since February 2024.

At the 2020 election, Bush and the Labor Party made several commitments to improve infrastructure at state schools in the Cooper electorate including an upgraded swimming pool amenities block at Ithaca Creek State School and an upgraded tuckshop at The Gap State High School, which were completed during her term. Bush also promised $2.4 million for an upgraded clubhouse for GPS Rugby and Valley's District Cricket Club at Ashgrove, which opened in 2023.

Bush supported the Voluntary Assisted Dying Bill 2021, which legalised voluntary assisted dying in Queensland. The Bill was passed in a conscience vote (60–29) on 16 September 2021.

In 2023, Bush advocated for stronger environmental protections for the Lake Eyre Basin and Channel Country from mining activities. After Steven Miles became Premier in December 2023, the State Government announced increased protections for the rivers and floodplains of the Basin. As an MP in the Miles Government, she also supported the Clean Economy Jobs Act 2024 and Energy (Renewable Transformation and Jobs) Act 2024, which legislated stronger renewable energy targets for Queensland (50 percent by 2030, 70 percent by 2032, 80 percent by 2035) and the phasing-out of coal-fired power generation by 2036, as well as stronger emissions reduction targets of 75 percent by 2035 and net zero by 2050.

As Member for Cooper, Bush campaigned in 2023 against a McDonald's development occurring on Waterworks Road in Ashgrove based on opposition from local residents and small businesses.

In response to sexual assaults and harassment against women along the hiking trails in the Mount Coot-tha bushlands, Jonty Bush and the Trail Running Association of Queensland organised a community event 'Reclaim the Trails' against gender-based violence in August 2024. The event took place at the JC Slaughter Falls section of the Mount Coot-tha bushlands and was attended by 300 walkers, hikers and runners.

During the 2024 Queensland State Election, Bush ran as the Labor incumbent, and while being a target seat for the Greens candidate Katinka Winstom-Allom, ultimately emerged victorious with a swing towards her of 0.7% (leaving the seat classed as a safe Labor seat).

== Personal life ==
Bush is in a de facto partnership and has one child and three step-daughters.

== Awards and honours ==
Bush won the Young Australian of the Year Award in 2009 in recognition of her work in advocacy for victims of crime in Queensland and her work in community safety education with the One Punch Can Kill campaign.

Parliament of Queensland
Preceded by Kate Jones	Member for Cooper; 2020–present	Incumbent
