= Hamilton Island =

Hamilton Island may refer to:

- Hamilton Island (Queensland), Australia
  - Hamilton Island Race Week, keelboat regatta
  - Hamilton Island Airport
- Hamilton Island (Nunavut), Canada
- MacDonald Island, British Columbia, Canada (called Hamilton Island 1940–72)

== See also ==
- Baillie-Hamilton Island, Nunavut, Canada
- Vesey Hamilton Island, Nunavut, Canada
