= Mirjam Novak =

German actress

- Born: Mirjam Elisabeth Novak; Nuremberg, Bavaria, Germany
- Occupation: Actress
- Years active: 2000–present
- Known for: Bauhaus Broken Wings (2006); The Best Job In The World finalist (2009); The Spy Who Dumped Me (2018)

Mirjam Elisabeth Novak (born 16 January 1981 in Nuremberg) is an actress and screenwriter of Croatian-German descent who has appeared in various films and television shows in the US, England, Canada and Germany.

She moved to Los Angeles to attend the Lee Strasberg Theatre and Film Institute there in 2001 and completed her training in 2005. After that, Mirjam returned to her native Germany and enrolled at the Humboldt University in Berlin, earning a Bachelor of Arts degree in History and English in 2009.

In May 2009 she was one of 16 finalists out of over 34,000 applicants for Tourism Queensland's "The Best Job In The World" competition. She subsequently spent almost 3 months travelling in Australia and blogging about her experience and appeared in a series of commercials for Tourism Queensland. She also was involved with Tourism Queensland as ambassador for the region in Germany.

She has appeared in the short film Bauhaus Broken Wings (as Ellen Schuster) that played at several film festivals in the US and Germany; and in films such as The Spy Who Dumped Me (as Verne) and series such as Strike Back (as Marie Parker) and Halo (as Tesic) as well as on German television with the series 112 – Sie retten dein Leben (as Tara Zenner) and Herzogpark (as Hellen).

== Selected filmography ==
Year	Film	Role	Notes
2004	Evil Eyes	Camille	
2004	Cotton Flowers	Lyndie	Short film
2006	Apology	Judy	Short film
2006	Bauhaus Broken Wings	Ellen Schuster	Short film
2008	112 – Sie retten dein Leben	Tara Zenner	TV
2009	The Best Job In The World	Finalist Top 16	Appearance in various TV shows
2011	Bielefeld - Die in Style	Sarah Powell	Short film
2016	The Last Kingdom	Saxon Lady	BBC America
2016	Mars	American ISMF Member	NAT GEO / SKY
2017	Papillon	Irish Nun	Movie
2018	The Spy Who Dumped Me	Verne	Movie
	Strike Back	Marie Parker	Sky One, Cinemax
2019	Radioactive	Nurse Francoise	Movie
2020	Complete Strangers	Dr Wallace	Movie
2021	Honeysuckle	Inge	Movie
2022	Halo	Flight Tec Tesic	Sky, Paramount
2022	Herzogpark	Hellen	RTL+
