= The Best Job in the World =

The Best Job in the World may refer to:

- The Best Job in the World, 1996 film
- The Best Job in the World (advertising), a 2009 advertising campaign
