= Tara Festival of Culture and Camel Races =

Camel race festival in Tara, Australia

The Tara Festival of Culture and Camel Races is a cultural event held every two years during the first weekend of August in Tara, Queensland since 2001. The weekend features live entertainment and multicultural performances, and is supported by the Queensland Government through Tourism and Events Queensland.

Based just four hours from the Queensland capital of Brisbane, the festival attracts approximately 16,000 visitors annually across the weekend's events. As the last stop on the winter Outback Queensland camel racing circuit, the festival attracts the top camel racing talent from around Australia.

Camel races are held on the Saturday and Sunday of the festival, with seven races taking place on both days. The Plate Cup 600m final race is the final race held on Sunday.

== History ==
The event celebrated its 10th anniversary in 2019, attracting its largest crowd on record with 25,000 total attendance over the three days. Entertainment across the weekend included fireworks displays, Bollywood dance workshops, Indigenous performers, camel rides and Japanese drummers. Australian country music group The McClymonts headlined the entertainment acts on the Saturday night of the festival

In 2021, the festival was cancelled due to ongoing COVID-19 restrictions.
