= Outback Queensland Masters =

Golf event series

- Status: Active
- Genre: Golf series
- Begins: 17 June 2023
- Ends: 23 July 2023
- Frequency: Annually
- Location: Outback Queensland
- Country: Australia
- Years active: 7
- Inaugurated: 2019
- Sponsor: Golf Australia, Tourism & Events Queensland
- Website: www.outbackqldmasters.com

Outback Queensland Masters, also known as OQM, is an amateur golf tour and Australia's most remote golf series, presented by Golf Australia with Tourism & Events Queensland and the PGA of Australia.: Outback Queensland Masters series is the richest amateur prize pool in the world that takes place across five locations in outback Queensland offering $10,000 hole-in-one challenges, culminating in the 'Million Dollar Hole-in-one' challenge.

== History ==
The golf series was first launched in 2019 as part of the Queensland Government's "Year of Outback Tourism" events program that aimed to enhance the profile of Outback Queensland and boost tourism within the region.; The initial tournament took place in Roma, Mount Isa, Charleville, Longreach, Winton, and Boulia from 17 June - 28 July 2019.

== Format ==
The event is open to first-time, social, and amateur golfers. A player may enter the series in one of two separate groups, based on whether or not they hold a Golf Australia Handicap. Each individual event in the series is played over two 9-hole rounds held on the first and second days of the event respectively.

The OQM Series Championship may be won by a player entered with a Golf Australia Handicap, and is determined by the largest combined total point score of six 9-hole stableford scores.

The OQM Series Prize may be won by a player entered without a GA Handicap, and is based on a random draw. A player receives one entry into the draw once they have participated in three OQM events. Additional entries may be accepted if a player participates in four or more OQM events.

Both players in Group 1 and Group 2 are eligible for the $10,000 Hole-In-One Challenge prizes. The prizes will be won by the first eligible player to have a Hole-in-One on the designated hole during the two day event.

The Longreach Million Dollar Hole-in-One challenge is open to all players if they have played in at least two other OQM events. The $1,000,000 will be won by the first eligible player to have a Hole-in-One on the designated hole during the Longreach OQM event.

== By year ==
=== 2023 ===
The 2023 Outback Queensland Masters will take place over six consecutive weekends from 17 June to 23 July, spanning over 2,000 kilometres across Queensland’s Outback:

- St George - 17 & 18 June 2023
- Cunnamulla - 24 & 25 June 2023
- Quilpie - 1 & 2 July 2023
- Richmond - 8 & 9 July 2023
- Karumba - 15 & 16 July 2023
- Mount Isa - 21 & 23 July 2023

=== 2022 ===
The 2022 Outback Queensland Masters will take place in six destination across Outback Queensland, culminating at the Birdsville Dunes Golf Club

- Roma – 18 & 19 June 2022
- Tambo – 25 & 26 June 2022
- Barcaldine – 2 & 3 July 2022
- Winton – 9 & 10 July 2022
- Mount Isa – 16 & 17 July 2022
- Birdsville – 22, 23 & 24 July 2022

=== 2021 ===
The 2021 event took place over six locations, with more than 200 golfers taking part in the six week series. The sold out tournament travelled through Biloela, Charleville, Quilpie, Blackall, and Hughenden before wrapping up in Longreach.

The Blackall leg of the series attracted a record number of 143 amateur golfers taking part.

2021 Outback Queensland Masters Series Championship winners;

- Men: Laurie Binstead – Hervey Bay Golf Club – 117 points
- Women: Ann Backhouse – Murrumbidgee Golf Club – 119 points

=== 2020 ===
The 2020 event was cancelled due to COVID-19 travel restrictions.

=== 2019 ===
The inaugural event in 2019 attracted 2,692 attendees, contributed $1.55m to the Queensland economy and was awarded 'Best New Event' at the 2020 Australian Event Awards.
