= Keith Williams (developer) =

Australian entrepreneur

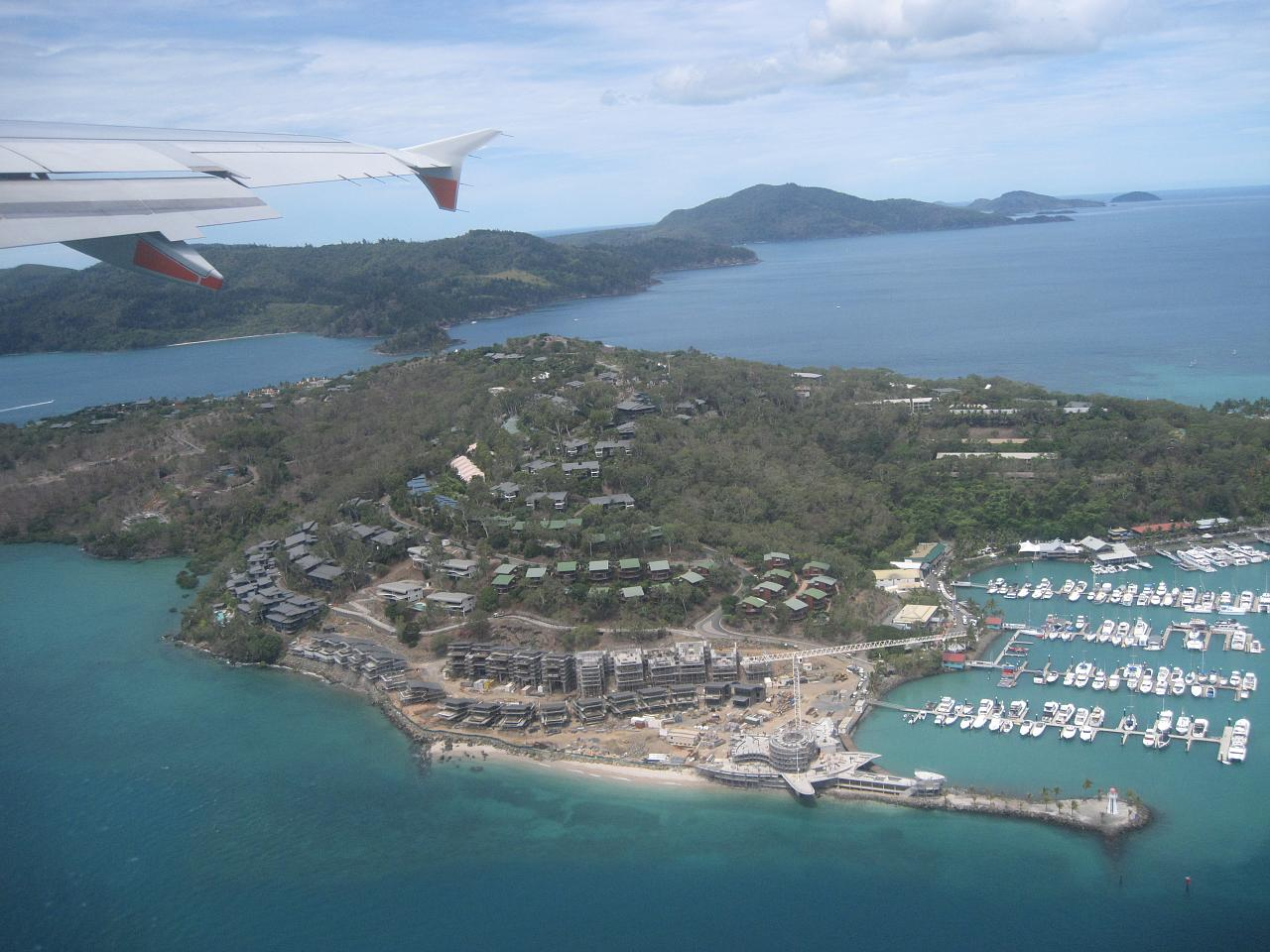
Hamilton Island, developed by Williams in the 1970s and 80s

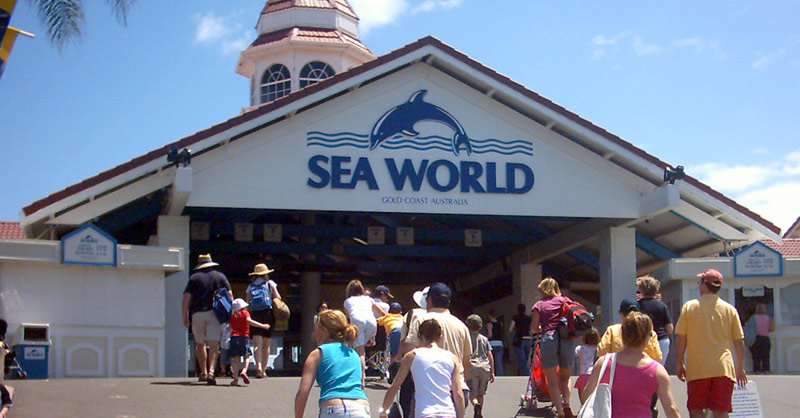
Sea World Australia

Keith Williams, CMG (22 September 1929 – 19 October 2011) was an Australian businessman. He worked on attractions in Queensland, including Sea World, Hamilton Island and Port Hinchinbrook.

Williams was born in Brisbane on 22 September 1929. He left school aged 13 and by aged 16 had started his first business. At age 19, he made products licensed by Walt Disney in a self-built factory at Bulimba with 50 employees. Williams began his career in the 1960s with the creation of a water skiing park in Surfers Paradise. This was followed by a raceway, Sea World, and Hamilton Island, Daydream Island and Port Hinchinbrook.

Williams was an Australian water-skiing champion. He married a former TV star and later Miss Gold Coast, Thea Williams, in 1963.
