= Frank Moore (tourism advocate) =

Australian businessman (1930–2024)

Sir Frank Thomas Moore, AO (29 November 1930 – 10 October 2024) was an Australian businessman noted for his long-term promotion of the Australian tourism industry, particularly in Queensland.

== Biography ==
Moore was born in Queensland on 29 November 1930, to Francis Edward Moore and Beatrice Moore, nee Leonard (his mother turned 100 in 2011). He first had a career in property valuation and radio broadcasting. In 1978 he was appointed to head the Queensland Government inquiry that led to the establishment of the Queensland Tourist and Travel Corporation (now Tourism and Events Queensland). He was chair of the Corporation 1978-90, during which time he spearheaded the creation of international airports in Townsville and Cairns.

He was chair of the Australian Tourism Industry Association 1984-96, and also chair of the Australian Tourism Research Institute. He was instrumental in creating the team and the application for Queensland's successful nomination to host World Expo 88 in Brisbane. Moore oversaw the development of the Cooperative Research Centre for Sustainable Tourism and was chair of the Centre 1997-2007. He has also served as chair of the Federal Government's Tourism Forecasting Council, Nature Resorts Limited, Advent Tourism Fund Management Ltd and Great Southern Railway. He was a founding director of Jupiters Limited, a Director of Gold Coast Airport Corporation and a member of the World Travel and Tourism Council. Moore died on 10 October 2024, at the age of 93.

== Honours ==
Moore was knighted in 1983 for services to tourism. He was appointed an Officer of the Order of Australia (AO) in 1991. He was awarded the Centenary Medal in 2001. In 2008 the University of Queensland awarded him an honorary doctorate.
