= Evil Eyes =

- DVD cover
- Directed by: Mark Atkins
- Written by: Naomi Selfman
- Starring: Adam Baldwin; Jennifer Gates; Udo Kier; Mark Sheppard; Kristin Loren; Jason David
- Distributed by: The Asylum
- Release date: 2004
- Running time: 88 minutes
- Country: United States
- Language: English
- Budget: $1,000,000

Evil Eyes is a 2004 direct-to-DVD horror film produced by The Asylum, directed by Mark Atkins and starring Adam Baldwin.

== Plot ==
The film centres on Jeff Stenn (Adam Baldwin), a successful writer who is happily married to his wife, "Tree" (Jennifer Gates). Jeff, due to a shortage of money, accepts a job to write a screenplay about a real-life homicide that happened 35 years earlier. A seemingly psychotic director (Udo Kier) who believed that creativity had unleashed dark forces, killed his pregnant wife and in-laws for no apparent reason before committing suicide.

As Jeff continues to work on the screenplay, several accidents occur around him that directly mirror events in his script. Jeff begins to think that his writing has the power to affect reality, and must question whether finishing the script will bring about the death of his own family.

== Main cast ==
- Adam Baldwin as Jeff Stenn
- Jennifer Gates as "Tree" Stenn
- Udo Kier as George
- Mark Sheppard as Peter
- Kristin Lorenz as Nina
- Peta Johnson as Marilyn
- Eric Casselton as Gramm
- Lanre Idewu as Bryce
- Lee Anne Moore as Mrs. Marsh
- Ronald Rezac as Tree's Father
- Julie Dickens as Claudia
- Jason David as Greg
- Byron James as Bob
- Elizabeth Uhl as Judy
- Mirjam Novak as Camille
