= Hamilton Island Race Week =

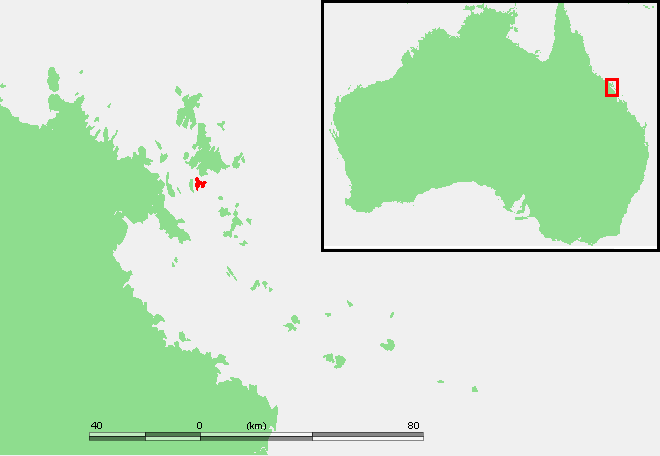
- Hamilton Island Location
- Sport: Sailing
- Founded: 1984
- No. of teams: 250+
- Country: Host:Australia; Fleet: International
- Official website: http://hamiltonislandraceweek.com.au/

Hamilton Island Race Week is a keelboat regatta set against the backdrop of the Whitsunday Islands, on Queensland's Great Barrier Reef. It is one of Australia’s favourite yachting events and a firm fixture on the international sailing calendar. Competitors, family and friends come together to enjoy the convivial atmosphere and unique camaraderie of the event’s on-water and off-water carnival.

== History ==
Race Week was conceived by David Hutchen in 1983, after he had moved to the Whitsundays with his yacht Banjo Paterson to start a yacht charter business. David was able to convince the then owner and founder of Hamilton Island, Keith Williams, to agree to hosting the event as a way of generating tourism and favorable media attention to the resort.

A three-man Race Committee was formed, David Hutchen, Warwick Hoban and Leon O’Donoghue. For the first few years the event was these three committeemen were heavily involved in all elements of organising and running the regatta as well as social activities.

The first event was in April 1984 with a fleet of 93 boats contesting. For the next few years the fleet was down around 60 boats, but grew gradually.

For the first eight years Race Week was held in April, starting on the first Saturday after Easter. Southern boats sailed up the coast in the Sydney to Mooloolaba race, and then the Brisbane to Gladstone race at Easter, then made their way to Hamilton Island. It meant that those southern Australian boats were having to leave their home base before the end of the summer sailing season, which wasn’t as appealing as the prospect of doing some winter sailing in warmer climates.

After eight years of having Race Week in April, it was moved to August in 1992 to take advantage of more consistent and attractive weather conditions. The change in timing has seen the event grow significantly over the years becoming Australia's largest offshore yachting regatta with approximately 250 boats competing every year.

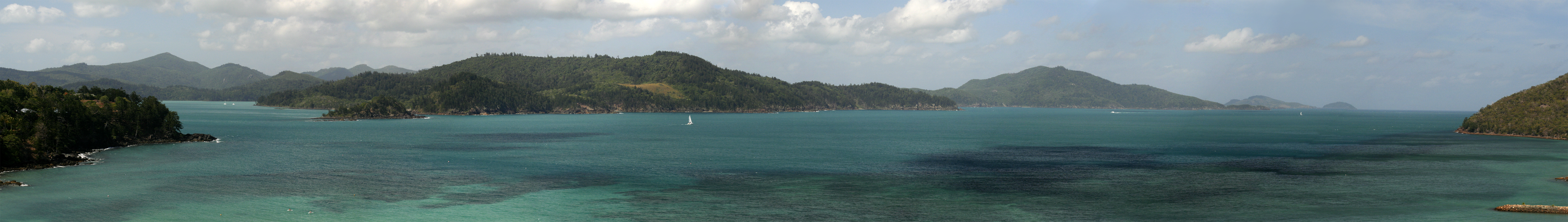
Whitsunday Islands, scene of the event

== Race records ==
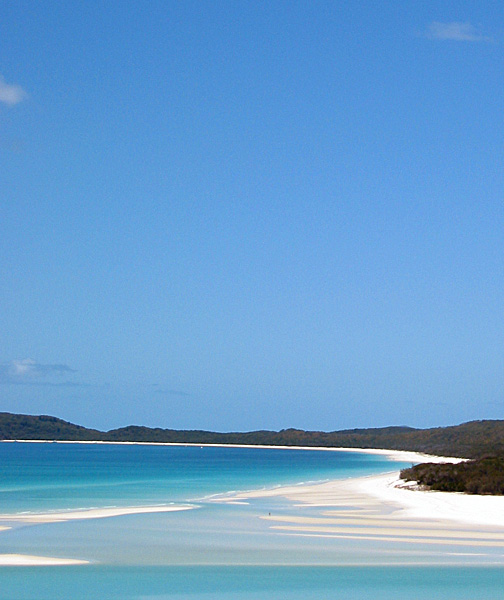
Whitehaven beach

- South Molle/Daydream Is Race — 2005: Alfa Romeo - 1:51:01 (Neville Crichton)
- Coral Sea Race (83.3 miles):
  - Fastest — 1998: Brindabella - 8:49:52 (George Snow)
  - Slowest — 2001: Step Ahead - 24:24:56 (Glenn Tailby)
- Edward Island Race (modified course) — 2007: Wild Oats X- 5:11:27 (Bob Oatley)
- Lindeman Island Race — 2005: Alfa Romeo - 1:58:34 (Neville Crichton)

== On-water events ==
There are several exciting on-water events throughout Hamilton Island Race Week, including sailing events for several race classes and divisions, as well as the popular Prix d’ Elegance.

== Off-water events ==
During Hamilton Island Race Week, Hamilton Island hosts a large number of social events for men and women of all ages. The most famous event is the Whitehaven Beach Party where boats from all over the Whitsunday region converge on the white sands of Whitehaven beach to drink, eat, and dance to celebrate the end of race week. Other major events include the Wild Oats Wine Ladies lunch, the Paspaley luncheon and dinner, the Piper Heidsieck Champagne lunch, the Surf and Turf Dinner and more. Hamilton Island Race Week is also filled with other activities such as food markets, fashion events, cocktail parties and beach yoga.

Hamilton Island Race Week hosts a wide variety of local and abroad celebrities ranging from international singers, chefs, actors, photographers and models such as Emma Louise, Matt Moran, Asher Keddie, Simon Baker, Lisa Wilkinson and Carmen Hamilton to name a few.
