= Hamilton Island (Queensland) =

Island in Whitsunday Region, Queensland, Australia

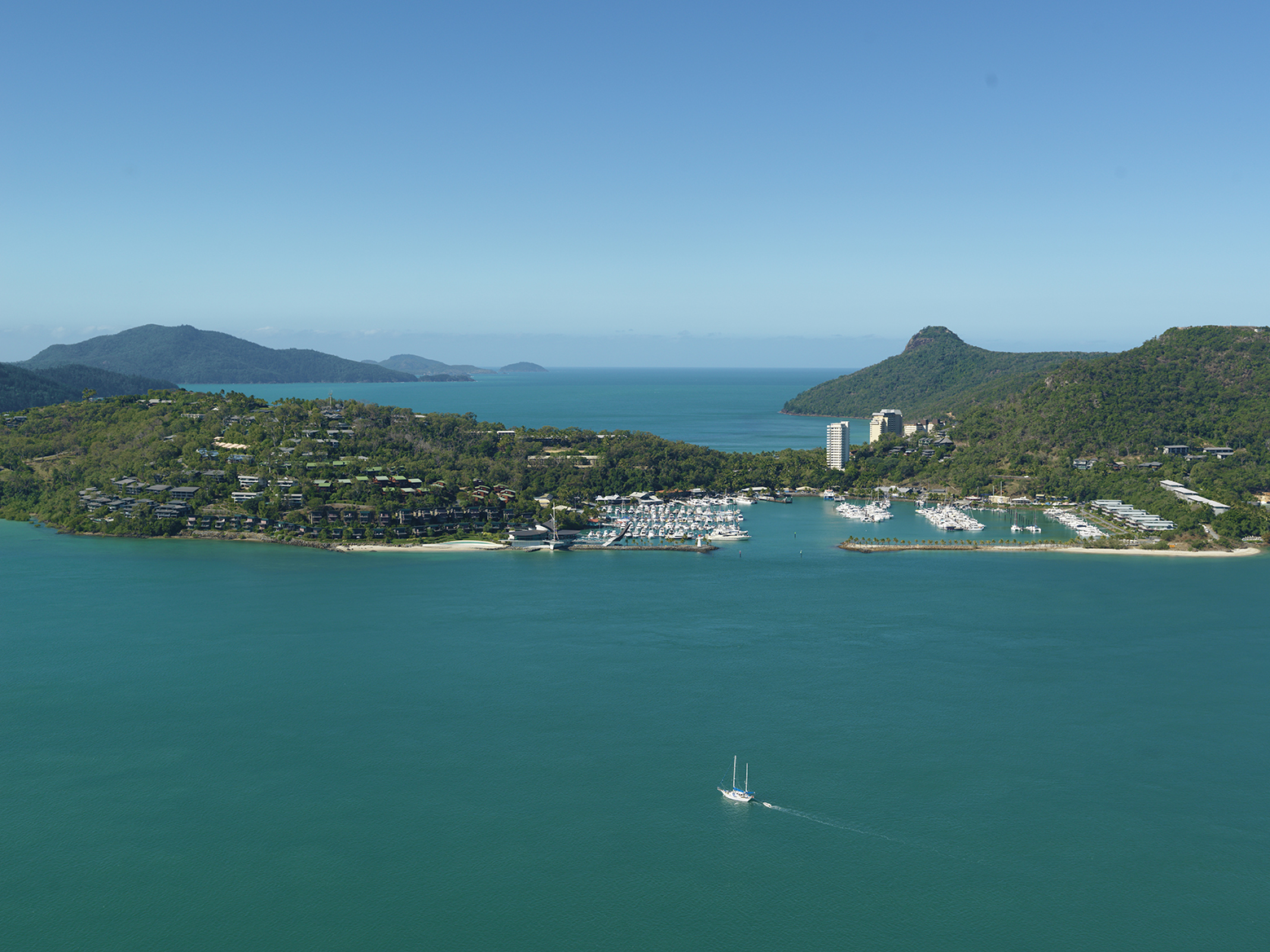
- Hamilton Island marina, 2012

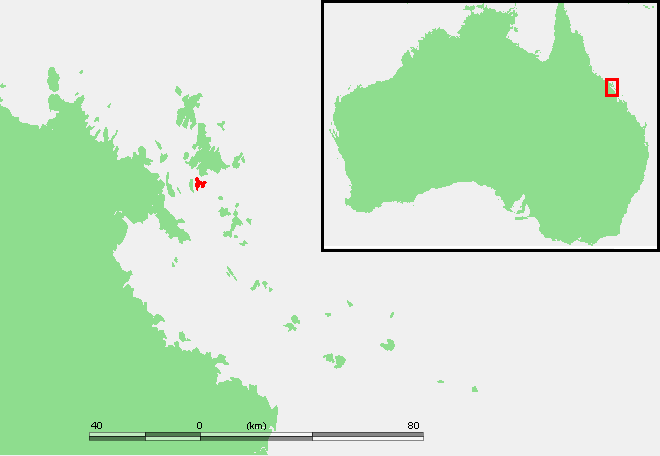

Geography
- Location: Queensland, Australia
- Coordinates: 20.3533°S 148.9620°E
- Archipelago: Whitsunday Islands
- Area: 7.53 km^{2} (2.91 sq mi)

Administration
- Australia
- State: Queensland
- LGA: Whitsunday Region

Demographics
- Population: 1,759 (2021 census)

Hamilton Island is an island of the Whitsunday Islands in Queensland, Australia. It is approximately 887 kilometres (551 mi) north of Brisbane and 512 kilometres (318 mi) south of Cairns. It is the largest inhabited island of the Whitsunday Islands and a popular year-round tourist destination.

Hamilton Island is one of the only islands in the Great Barrier Reef with a commercial airport, offering direct flights from Sydney, Melbourne and Brisbane. In the 2021 census, Hamilton Island had a population of 1,759 people.

== Geography ==
Like most islands in the Whitsunday group, Hamilton Island was formed as sea levels rose, creating numerous drowned mountains that are situated close to the east coast of Queensland. It is one of the larger islands in the Whitsundays.

The central north-facing Catseye Beach is man-made. It is open to the public as well as the island's guests.

=== Climate ===
Hamilton Island has a tropical savanna climate (Köppen: Aw) with a hot, rainy season during the summer and a warm, relatively dry season during the winter months.

Climate data for Hamilton Island Airport (20º22'S, 148º57'E, 59 m AMSL) (2002–2024 and extremes)
Month	Jan	Feb	Mar	Apr	May	Jun	Jul	Aug	Sep	Oct	Nov	Dec	Year
Record high °C (°F)	34.5 (94.1)	35.6 (96.1)	33.2 (91.8)	31.3 (88.3)	29.0 (84.2)	28.4 (83.1)	26.8 (80.2)	28.4 (83.1)	31.7 (89.1)	31.9 (89.4)	34.2 (93.6)	35.6 (96.1)	35.6 (96.1)
Mean daily maximum °C (°F)	29.9 (85.8)	29.7 (85.5)	28.9 (84.0)	27.0 (80.6)	24.4 (75.9)	22.3 (72.1)	21.5 (70.7)	22.9 (73.2)	25.3 (77.5)	27.4 (81.3)	28.7 (83.7)	29.9 (85.8)	26.5 (79.7)
Mean daily minimum °C (°F)	24.9 (76.8)	24.9 (76.8)	24.5 (76.1)	22.9 (73.2)	20.6 (69.1)	18.9 (66.0)	18.0 (64.4)	18.5 (65.3)	20.2 (68.4)	22.1 (71.8)	23.4 (74.1)	24.6 (76.3)	22.0 (71.5)
Record low °C (°F)	21.0 (69.8)	20.5 (68.9)	19.1 (66.4)	18.4 (65.1)	13.9 (57.0)	13.3 (55.9)	12.1 (53.8)	13.6 (56.5)	15.1 (59.2)	18.0 (64.4)	19.4 (66.9)	19.2 (66.6)	12.1 (53.8)
Average precipitation mm (inches)	293.4 (11.55)	264.1 (10.40)	231.8 (9.13)	156.2 (6.15)	94.2 (3.71)	56.0 (2.20)	54.4 (2.14)	23.6 (0.93)	26.4 (1.04)	25.3 (1.00)	75.0 (2.95)	136.2 (5.36)	1,436.6 (56.56)
Average precipitation days (≥ 1.0 mm)	13.0	13.8	14.3	12.2	10.8	7.4	6.0	3.3	2.7	3.6	5.4	7.6	100.1
Source: Bureau of Meteorology

The previous site, which collected data from 1985 to 2002, is still open. Measurements are now taken from the airport, 1.5 km away.

Climate data for Hamilton Island (20º21'S, 148º57'E, 23 m AMSL) (1985–2002 normals and extremes)
Month	Jan	Feb	Mar	Apr	May	Jun	Jul	Aug	Sep	Oct	Nov	Dec	Year
Record high °C (°F)	38.5 (101.3)	38.2 (100.8)	34.9 (94.8)	32.5 (90.5)	28.9 (84.0)	27.2 (81.0)	29.7 (85.5)	27.8 (82.0)	30.0 (86.0)	31.5 (88.7)	34.7 (94.5)	38.1 (100.6)	38.5 (101.3)
Mean daily maximum °C (°F)	30.4 (86.7)	30.1 (86.2)	28.8 (83.8)	27.1 (80.8)	24.8 (76.6)	22.4 (72.3)	21.9 (71.4)	22.9 (73.2)	25.4 (77.7)	27.6 (81.7)	29.1 (84.4)	30.0 (86.0)	26.7 (80.1)
Mean daily minimum °C (°F)	24.9 (76.8)	24.9 (76.8)	24.0 (75.2)	22.6 (72.7)	20.8 (69.4)	18.4 (65.1)	17.6 (63.7)	18.1 (64.6)	19.8 (67.6)	21.8 (71.2)	23.3 (73.9)	24.4 (75.9)	21.7 (71.1)
Record low °C (°F)	20.6 (69.1)	21.2 (70.2)	15.6 (60.1)	18.3 (64.9)	14.6 (58.3)	11.8 (53.2)	11.7 (53.1)	11.4 (52.5)	15.4 (59.7)	16.7 (62.1)	18.0 (64.4)	20.0 (68.0)	11.4 (52.5)
Average precipitation mm (inches)	277.1 (10.91)	316.5 (12.46)	270.4 (10.65)	193.7 (7.63)	121.6 (4.79)	80.8 (3.18)	65.8 (2.59)	40.3 (1.59)	26.2 (1.03)	39.4 (1.55)	92.1 (3.63)	181.6 (7.15)	1,699.7 (66.92)
Average precipitation days (≥ 1.0 mm)	12.0	13.9	14.9	13.7	12.1	8.4	6.3	5.0	3.1	4.7	5.7	8.3	108.1
Average afternoon relative humidity (%)	74	76	77	78	78	76	73	71	68	70	71	73	74
Average dew point °C (°F)	23.8 (74.8)	23.9 (75.0)	23.0 (73.4)	21.6 (70.9)	19.4 (66.9)	16.9 (62.4)	15.5 (59.9)	15.9 (60.6)	17.7 (63.9)	20.0 (68.0)	21.9 (71.4)	23.0 (73.4)	20.2 (68.4)
Source: Bureau of Meteorology

== History ==
Hamilton Island is believed to be named after a crew member of the survey vessels that charted the area in 1866–68. The island was purchased in 1975 by Keith Williams and Bryan Byrt for a grazing lease. In 1978, Williams commenced construction of Hamilton Island Harbour and the resort complex shortly after. The resort opened in phases between 1982 and 1984. In 1985, a fire destroyed most of the central portion of the resort complex, which was completely rebuilt by 1986.

The Whitsunday Holiday Apartments opened in 1986 followed by the Reef View Hotel in 1990. In 1992 the resort was placed in receivership and between 1995 and 2003 it was owned by BT Australia and managed by Holiday Inn for a portion of that time. In 1999, the five-star Beach Club opened. The island was purchased by the Oatley family, operators of a winemaking business, in 2003 and was listed for sale in 2023, shortly after taking the island off of the market, the Oatley family decided to invest further in Hamilton Island instead of selling.

Hamilton Island State School opened on 28 January 1986.

In 1987 George Harrison and his wife Olivia Harrison built a compound on the island in the South Pacific theme, which they called "Letsbeavenue". They lived there seasonally throughout the remainder of George's life. The residence still exists and is located on Melaleuca Ave, but was sold by the family in 2008, involving a legal dispute.

In 2009, there were two key infrastructure and tourism developments completed for the resort: the Hamilton Island Yacht Club, officially completed and opened by former Queensland Premier Anna Bligh during Hamilton Island Race Week, and the Hamilton Island Golf Club's new championship resort course, which opened in August 2009. The 18-hole course, on neighbouring Dent Island, measures 6,120 metres (20,080 ft) and is billed as the only championship island golf course in Australia.

In 2009, Tourism Queensland promoted the Great Barrier Reef as a global tourism destination with a website encouraging people worldwide to apply for "The Best Job in the World", to be a "Caretaker of the Islands" to "house-sit" the islands of the Great Barrier Reef for half a year, based on Hamilton Island.

In September 2016, it was reported by news media outlets that the Queensland Department of Environment and Heritage Protection (EHP) had issued damage mitigation permits that resulted in over 1,000 animals being culled on Hamilton Island between November 2014 and May 2016 by the resort's operator. Over 18 months, the cull resulted in the death of 599 common brushtail possums, 393 agile wallabies, 36 pied currawongs, 35 sulphur-crested cockatoos, three torresian crows and a laughing kookaburra. The EHP stated the role of the permits were to allow the "ongoing management of some wildlife species to prevent unacceptable levels of damage, and to protect public safety at the airport and in the resort itself". The resort management stated that "any culling of animals and birds is done as a last resort when all other methods have been exhausted". The RSPCA were unaware of any culling on the Island. The resort's management carried out the culls “to prevent damage or loss of property and to protect the health and wellbeing of staff, guests and other visitors”. Social media users were critical of the cull.

In January 2025, the Fair Work Ombudsman found that Hamilton Island Enterprises Ltd had underpaid thousands of salaried staff. This stemmed from errors in payroll practices, particularly regarding awards and pay rates, which resulted in staff not receiving their full entitlements. HIE signed an enforceable undertaking agreement and back-paid staff $28.1 million. The company was also required to implement a range of workplace changes, including an independent audit of salaried workers.

In December 2025, American investment company Blackstone Inc. entered an agreement to purchase the island.

== Demographics ==
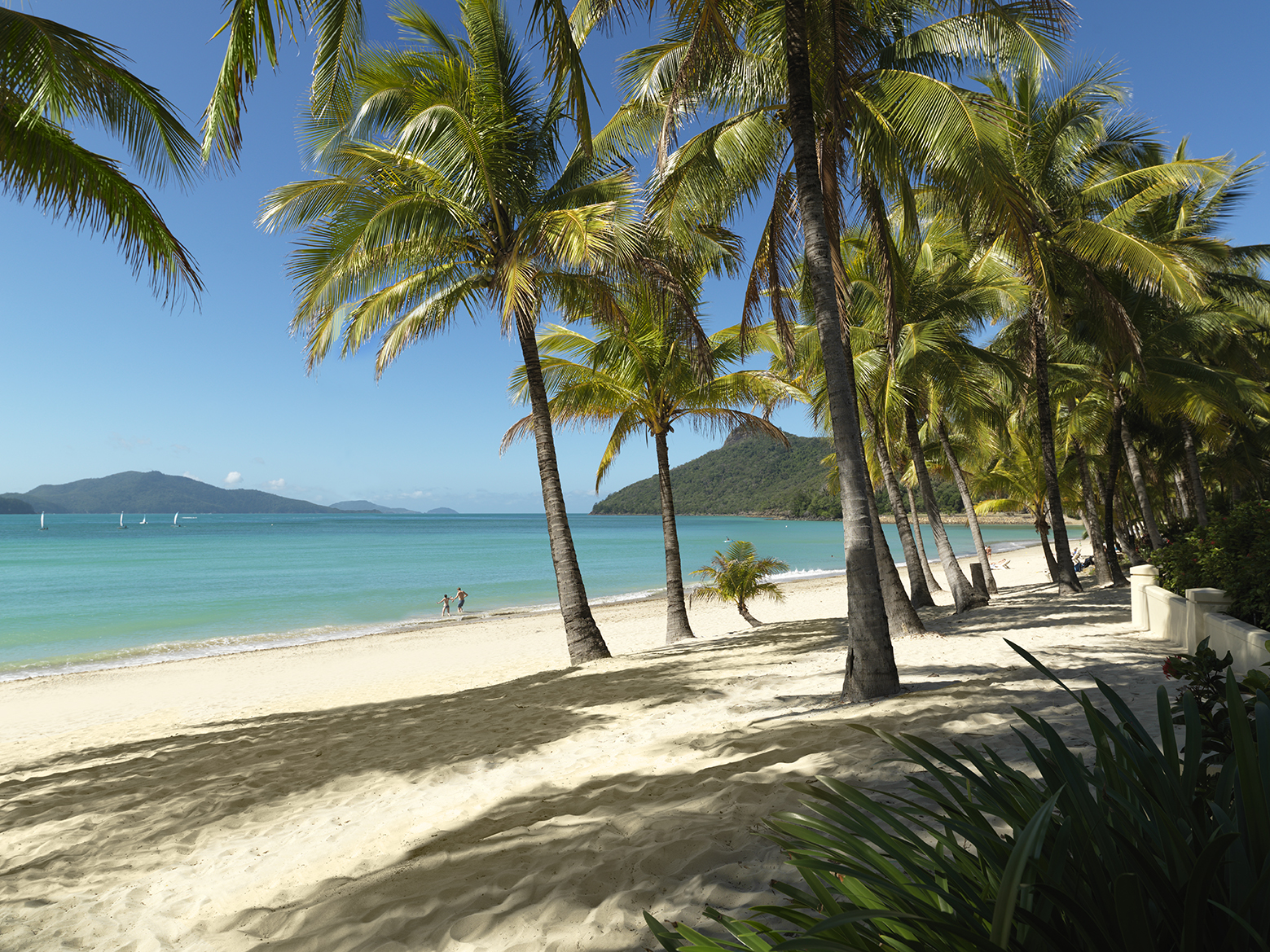
Catseye Beach on Hamilton Island

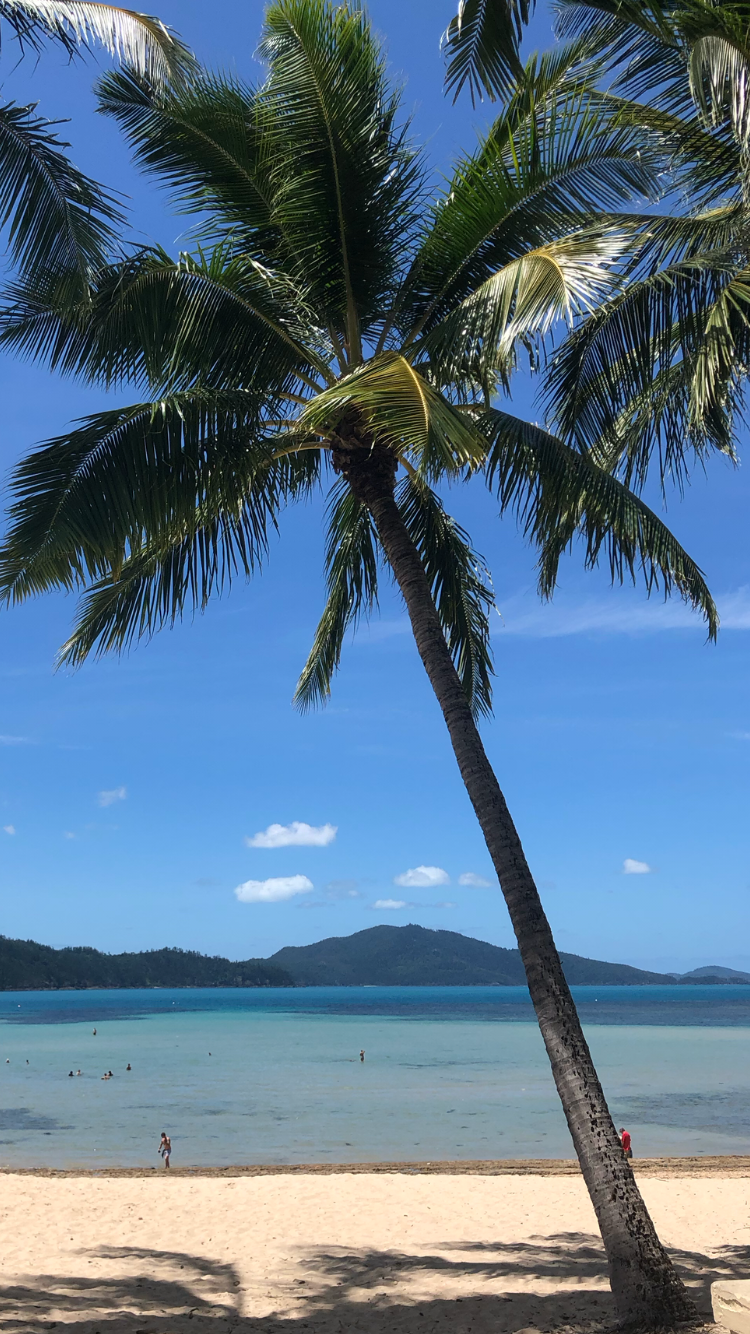
Palm tree in Catseye Beach, Hamilton Island

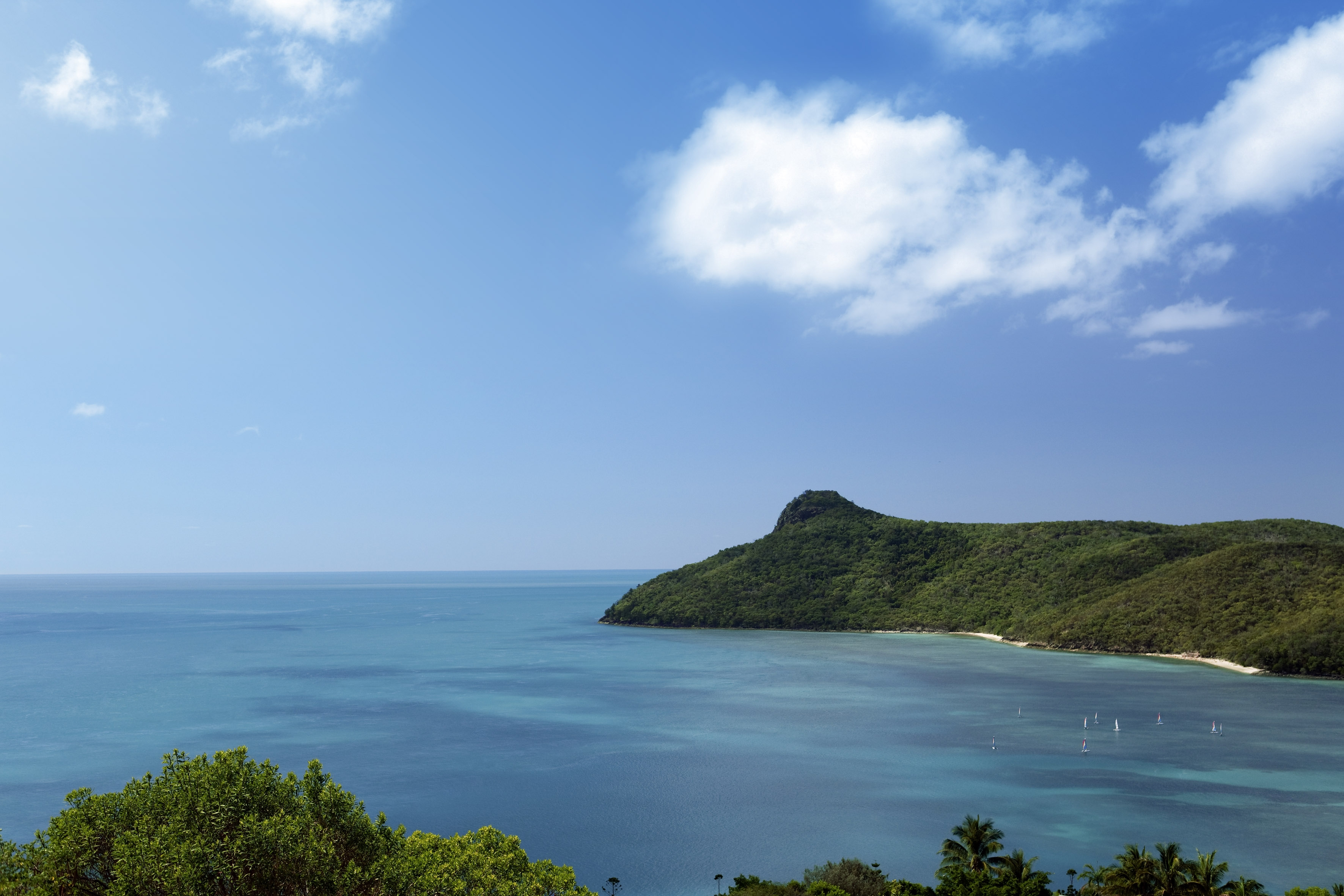
Passage Peak, the highest point on Hamilton Island

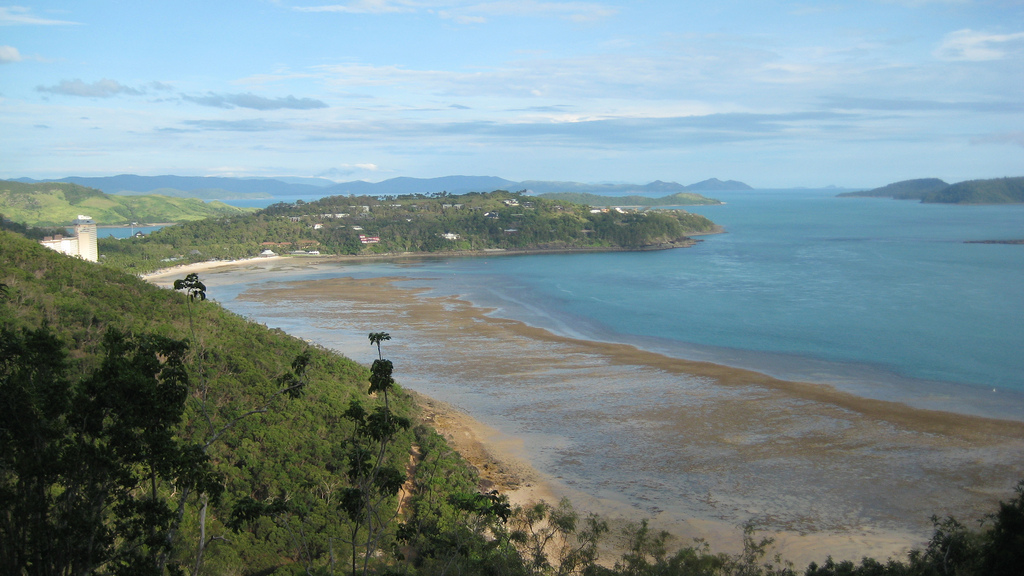
Low tide, 2011

In the 2011 census, Hamilton Island had a population of 1,208 people.

In the 2016 census, Hamilton Island had a population of 1,867 people.

In the 2021 census, Hamilton Island had a population of 1,759 people.

== Education ==
Hamilton Island State School, located on the north-west of the island, caters for students from the Preparatory Year to Year 6. The school also offers a range of extra-curricular offerings, such as students having the opportunity to learn how to sail and dive.

There are no secondary schools on the island nor nearby. The alternatives are distance education and boarding school, unless transport is available to attend Proserpine State High School in Proserpine.

== Facilities ==
Drinking water is provided by a combination of rainwater recycling, a dam, and seawater desalination. A reverse osmosis seawater desalination plant was commissioned in 1996 and can supply up to 1.3 million litres of potable water per day. The plant's seawater intake is driven by two vertical turbine pumps installed on a purpose made jetty. Waste brine is discharged to a pit where it gravitates to an ocean outfall away from the seawater intake. Electricity is provided by an undersea cable connected to the mainland, as well as by generators on the island.

Hamilton Island Airport, was one of the earlier infrastructure installations and was built in the early 1980s.

Taylor Swift stayed at the luxury resort, Qualia, in 2015.

== Transport ==
Hamilton Island Airport is the only airport in the Whitsunday Islands that is big enough to cater for larger commercial aircraft. Hamilton Island is also served by several ferries, which can only carry passengers. Mainland motor vehicles are prohibited on the island with the exception of those for tradespeople and island public transport.

== See also ==
- List of islands of Australia
- Tourism in Australia
