= Hamilton Island Airport =

Airport on Hamilton Island, Queensland, Australia

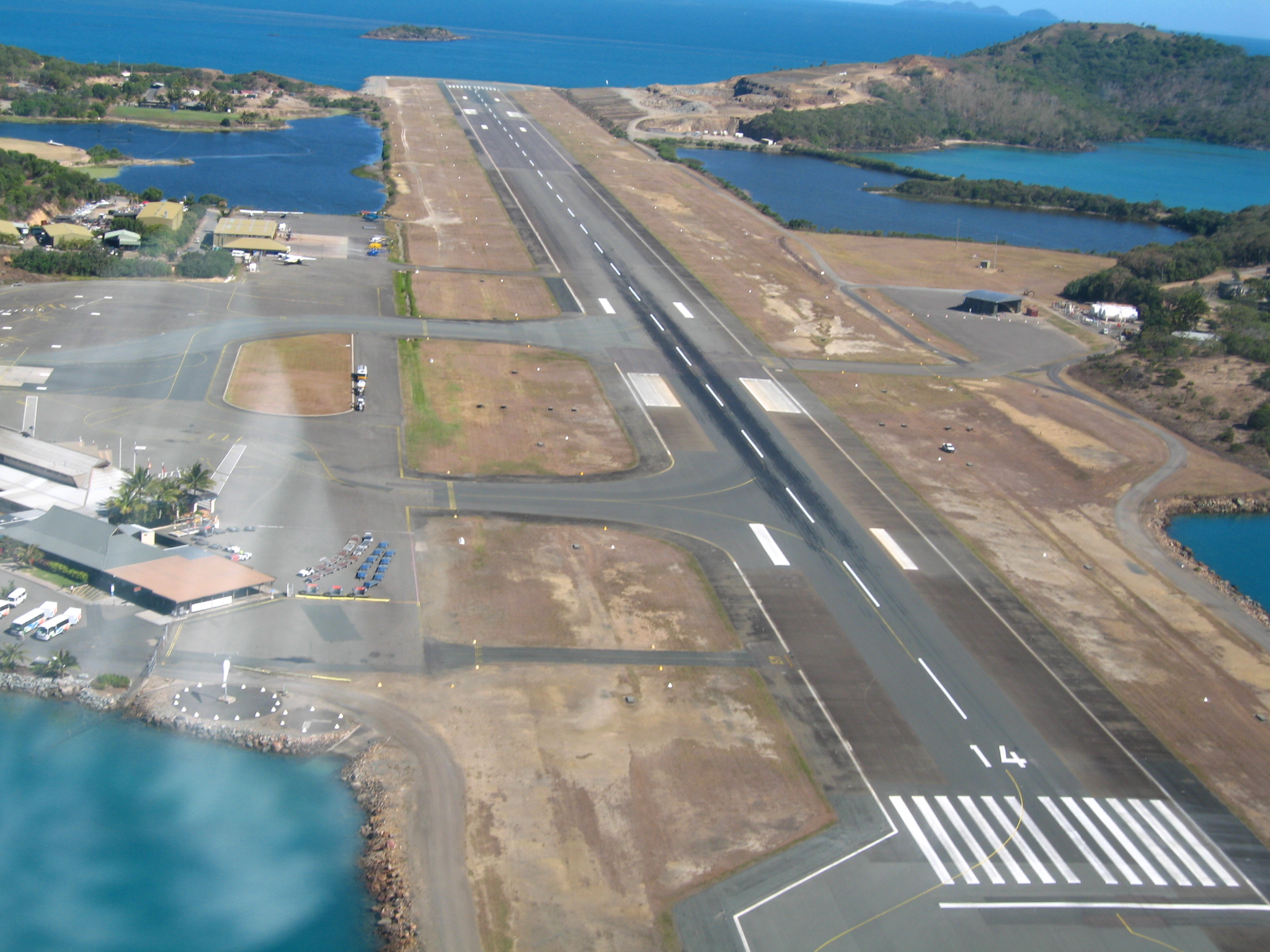
- IATA: HTI; ICAO: YBHM

Summary
- Airport type: Public
- Operator: Great Barrier Reef Airport Pty Ltd
- Location: Hamilton Island
- Opened: June 1984; 42 years ago
- Elevation AMSL: 15 ft (4.6 m)
- Coordinates: 20°21′29″S 148°57′06″E
- Website: Official website

Map
- Location in Queensland

Runways
Direction	Length		Surface
Direction	m	ft	Surface
14/32	1,764	5,787	Asphalt

Statistics
- Passengers: 500,000 (2022)
- Aircraft movements: 4,145
- Sources: Australian AIP and aerodrome chart BITRE

Hamilton Island Airport (IATA: HTI, ICAO: YBHM) is a privately owned public use aerodrome, the main airport on Hamilton Island, Queensland. The airport is settled on mostly reclaimed land and is commercially served year-round by Virgin Australia and Qantas. Hamilton Island Airport handles flights from Sydney, Melbourne and Brisbane.

It opened in June 1984, with Ansett Australia having exclusive rights to serve the airport, as part of its 50% shareholding. Ansett initially operated services from Brisbane and Sydney with Boeing 737s. The 1,764 metre runway was capable of accommodating Boeing 747SPs.

Ansett sold its shareholding to the BT Hotel Group in May 1998, allowing Qantas to begin to serve the airport. The airport suffered heavily in September 2001 with the demise of Ansett Australia, which operated more heavily out of the airport than any other airline with flights to Cairns, Townsville, Brisbane, the Gold Coast, Sydney, Melbourne and Adelaide.

In the year ending 30 June 2022 the airport handled 500,000 passengers.

== Airlines and destinations ==
Airlines	Destinations
Qantas	Sydney
QantasLink	Brisbane, Melbourne
Virgin Australia	Brisbane, Melbourne, Sydney

== Operations ==
Busiest domestic routes into and out of Hamilton Island Airport (FY 2025)
Rank	Airport	Passengers carried	% change
1	Sydney	252,400	▲4.8
2	Brisbane	161,500	▼ -0.6
