= The Best Job in the World (advertising) =

2009 campaign

In 2009, Tourism Queensland promoted the Great Barrier Reef as a global tourism destination with a website encouraging people worldwide to apply for The Best Job In The World, to be a "Caretaker of the Islands" to "house-sit" the islands of the Great Barrier Reef for half a year, based on Hamilton Island. The winner was Ben Southall, who beat over 34,000 candidates. It is considered a classic case study in viral marketing and destination marketing.

== Benefits ==
Job benefits included a large salary, free lodging in a multi million-dollar villa, and transportation there and around the islands. The application process required a web video to be submitted, available publicly for consideration for the position. The job duties listed were primarily publicity-related with web videos, blogging, and photo diaries.

== Public interest ==
The campaign benefitted from "seeding," in which paid media placements were used to post job ads in key global media. The submission web site (islandreefjob.com) crashed two days following the launch of the campaign, from excessive visits and application video uploading, and was cited as having "received 4 million hits an hour on day one of the campaign (more hits in the UK than google.com)."

Interest continued for months. On 11 February 2009, Christopher Grima jumped off the South Causeway Bridge in Fort Pierce in Florida. The police report said that he "wanted to capture a video of himself jumping off the bridge, to gain attention of the recruiters" for this job. He quickly received a summons for breach of the peace / disorderly conduct. More marketing-savvy applicants created blogs and established Facebook groups to create buzz about themselves. Two hoaxes also fueled interest.

BBC Television made a one-hour documentary about the final stages of the campaign which was directed by Agnieszka Piotrowska. Narrated by Toby Stephens, the film was broadcast on 2 July 2009 on BBC1 at 9pm, achieving the highest viewing figures for the whole week.

== Applicants ==
Over 35,000 applications were received from over 200 countries, and whittled down to 16 finalists (including one chosen by an on-line vote). Finalists came from Australia (two), United States (two), United Kingdom, Canada, Ireland, the Netherlands, Germany, New Zealand, Taiwan, India, China, Japan, France and South Korea. Ten were male and their ages ranged from 20 to 39. The candidates were interviewed on the island starting 3 May 2009. The United Kingdom finalist Ben Southall, 34, a charity fundraiser and ostrich-rider from Petersfield, Hampshire, UK, was appointed as the new caretaker of the island on 6 May 2009.

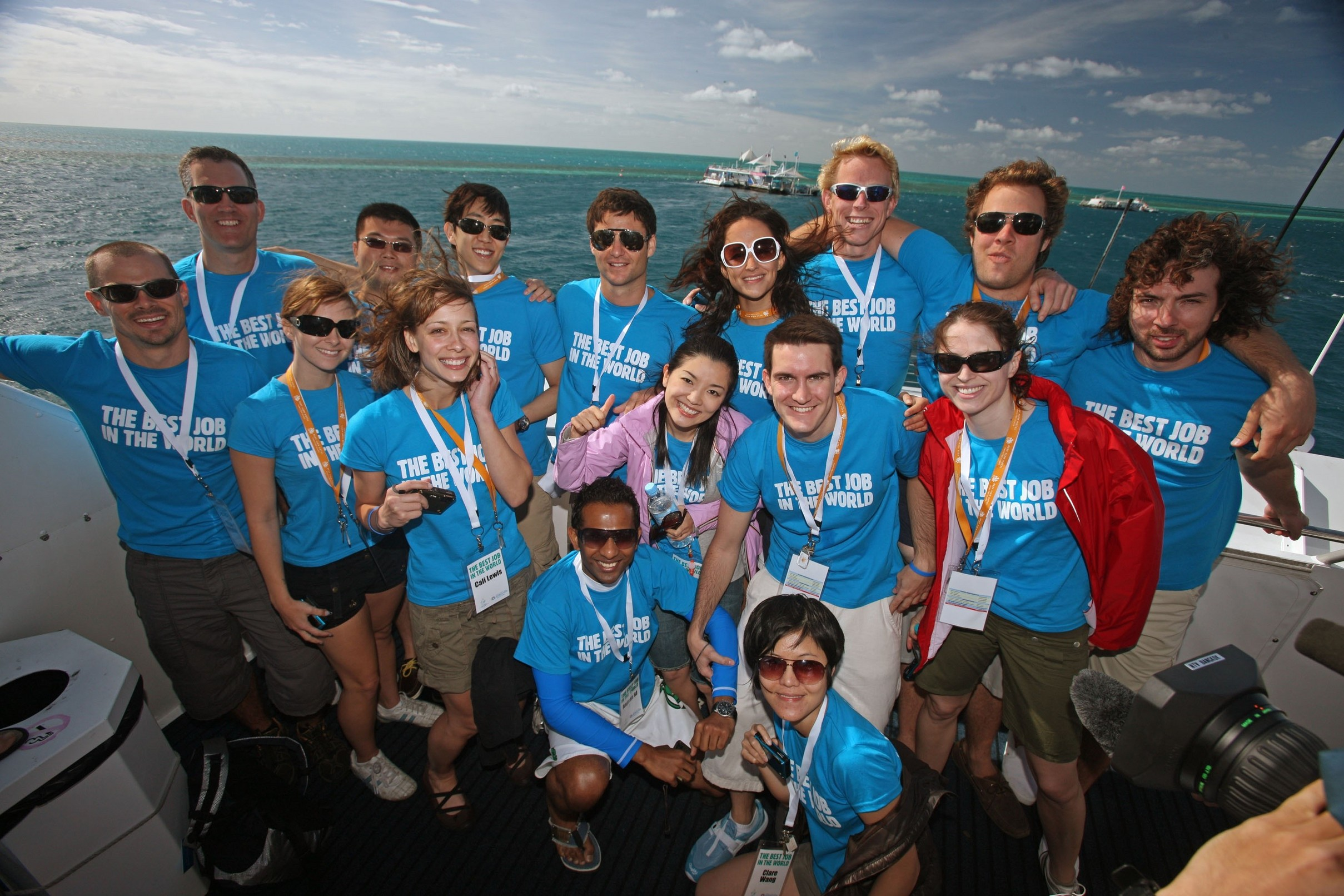
The competition attracted 34,684 entries and after four months, Ben Southall was announced the winner of the Best Job in the World

== Winner ==
The winner was Ben Southall, from the United Kingdom. In the last week of his paradise job, he was stung by an Irukandji jellyfish. Although lethal cases are known, he made a full recovery.

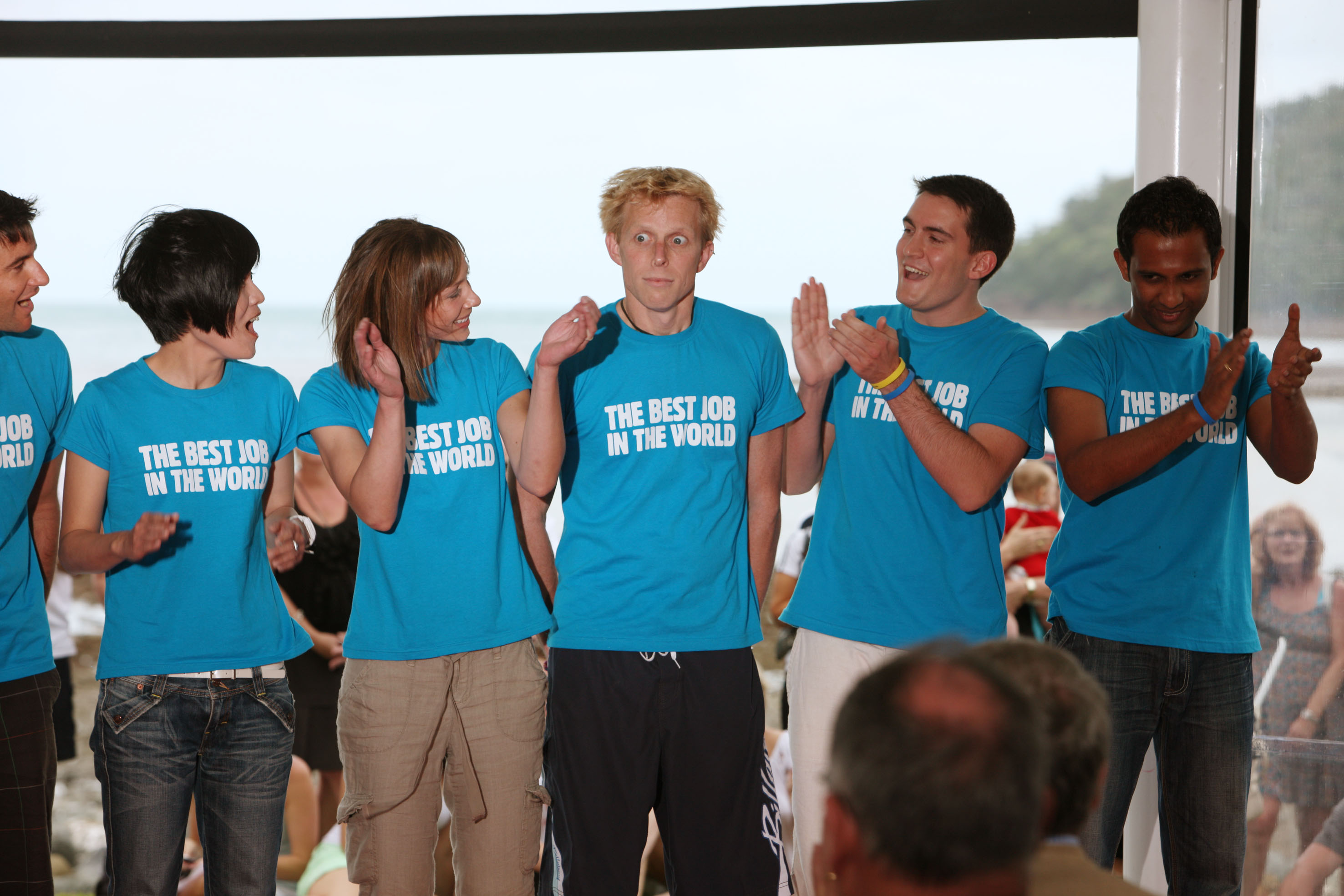
The competition attracted 34,684 entries and after four months, Ben Southall was announced the winner of the Best Job in the World

Southall is now an Ambassador of Queensland Tourism and took residency in Queensland after the six-month period on the island had ended. Since then Ben has established himself as an adventure advocate in Australia taking on extreme adventures around the world including a 1600 km kayak along the Great Barrier Reef in 2011, running a number of marathons around the country. He set a world record to climb the tallest mountain in each Australian state (8) in the shortest ever time in April 2013 - the Aussie 8 expedition took 8 days. His website follows his adventures around the planet.

In 2008 Southall circumnavigated Africa in a Land Rover, known as Colonel Mustard, covering 65,000 km. He climbed the five highest mountains on the continent and ran five marathons in the year raising $50,000 (AUS) for charity.

He married Sophee McPhee in November 2012 back on Hamilton Island where he lived as the Caretaker of the Islands of the Great Barrier Reef.

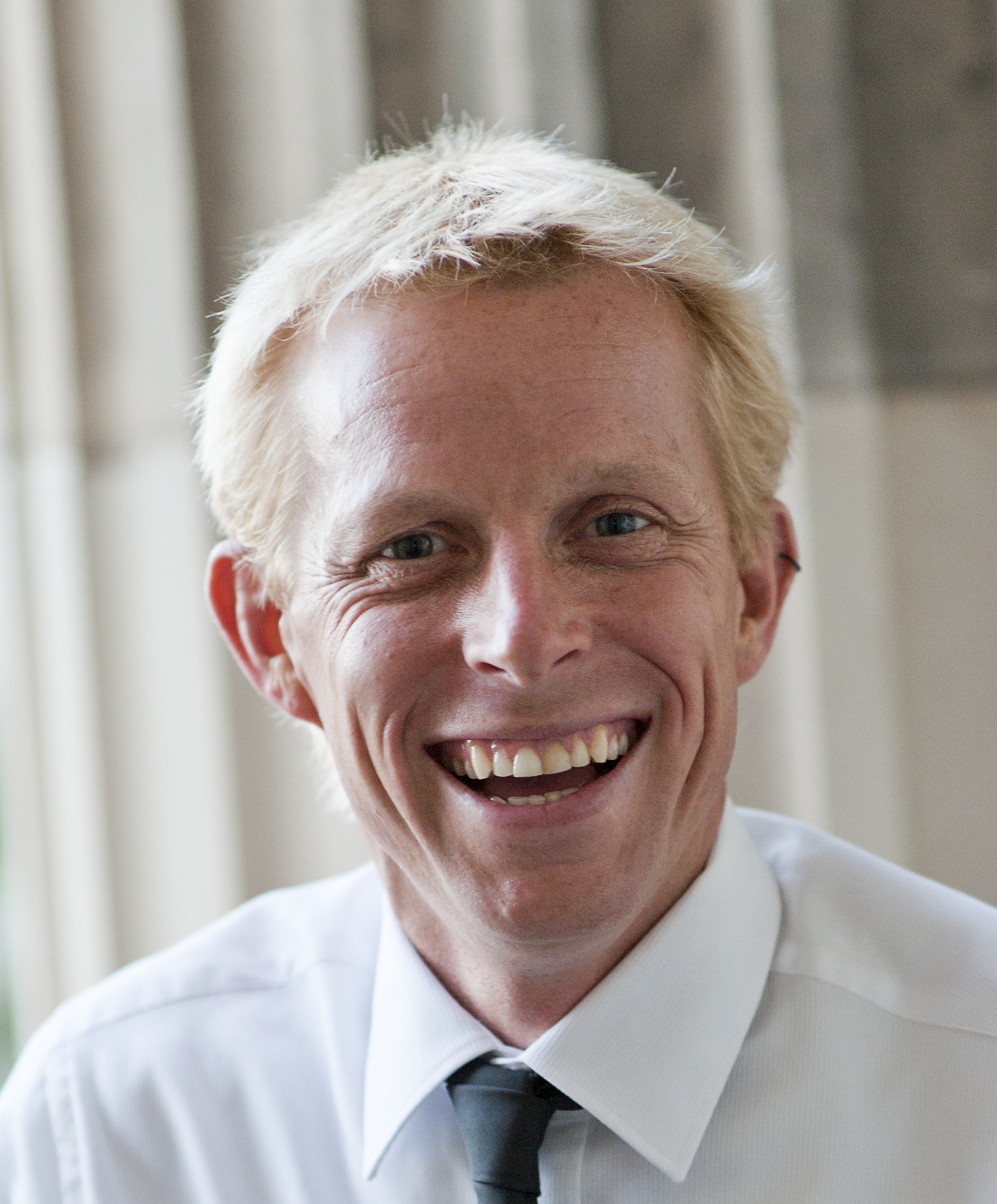
UQBS Ambassador Ben Southall hosting the MBA Awards Dinner

== Advertising Case Studies ==
Tourism Queensland invested US$1m in the campaign and generated US$70m of global publicity just one month after the campaign's launch. By the campaign's end, it generated more than an estimated $200 million in global publicity value for Tourism Queensland. The campaign was acknowledged as very successful.

Brisbane advertising agency CumminsNitro, credited with the campaign concept, was awarded three top awards at the prestigious Cannes International Advertising Festival. In 2010 the advertising campaign was awarded two prestigious D&AD Black Pencil Awards.

News coverage and advertising case studies on the campaign often characterize it as a classic example of a "viral campaign,"" aided by its competitive structure, incremental exposure generated by applicant videos and individuals "campaigning" for selection, and finally, news coverage of the competition which often contrasted the "Best Job" concept against that year's dismal job market, in which unemployment reached a record high of 212 million worldwide according to reports that year from the International Labour Organisation. Notably, this "viral" campaign example relied on heavily traditional media, according to international media buying agency Criterion Global, chiefly print.

Though it is considered in retrospect a "viral" marketing success, it did not win in the viral marketing category of the Cannes Lions that year; that award within the Cyber Lion grand prix, went to Warner Brothers' campaign for Heath Ledger's final film, The Dark Knight.

== See also ==
- Tourism in Australia
- Tourism and Events Queensland
- Destination marketing organization
- Viral marketing
