= Tourism and Events Queensland =

Queensland Government agency for tourism and promotion

Agency overview
- Preceding Agency: Queensland Tourist and Travel Corporation
- Superseding Agency: Department of Innovation and Tourism Industry Development and the Commonwealth Games
- Jurisdiction: Queensland
- Headquarters: 515 St Pauls Terrace, Fortitude Valley
- Employees: 130 (2014–15)
- Annual budget: A$119.34 million (2014–15)
- Minister responsible: Andrew Powell, Minister for Tourism
- Agency executives: Brett Godfrey, Board Chair; James Dixon, Board Deputy Chair
- Parent department: Department of Innovation and Tourism Industry Development and the Commonwealth Games
- Website: teq.queensland.com

Tourism and Events Queensland (TEQ) is the Queensland Government's lead marketing, experience development and major events agency, representing the state's tourism and events industries.

TEQ operates on a national and international level, looking at new and innovative ways to make the most out of emerging opportunities which benefit Queensland's tourism industry and economy.

== Background ==
The agency commenced life as the Queensland Tourist and Travel Corporation in 1978. It was set up by the government of Sir Joh Bjelke-Petersen on the recommendation of a government inquiry, headed by businessman Frank Moore (later Sir Frank). Moore was the first chair of the corporation 1978–90.

== Structure ==
Tourism and Events Queensland is located at 515 St Pauls Terrace, Fortitude Valley. The Department of Tourism, Major Events, Small Business and the Commonwealth Games (DTESB) was created on 3 April 2012, following the state election.

DTESB, which also includes the Office of Small Business, leads whole-of-government tourism initiatives and recognises the essential role of partnerships with industry and government in tourism industry development.

The portfolio partners include: The Tourism Group of Tourism and Events Queensland, The Events Group of Tourism and Events Queensland and Gold Coast 2018 Commonwealth Games Corporation.

== Activities ==
Tourism and Events Queensland collects statistics related to tourism in Queensland. Focus areas include source markets, destination markets and aviation. The department has developed a Queensland tourism and travel advice website called 'Queensland'. Through the website, TEQ provides information and travel guides on Queensland's 13 regional tourism destinations:

- Far North Queensland
- Townsville
- Whitsunday Islands
- Mackay
- Bundaberg
- Capricorn
- Gladstone
- Fraser Coast
- Sunshine Coast
- Brisbane
- Gold Coast
- Southern Queensland Country
- Outback Queensland

The agency also periodically also releases reports based on studies on niche markets, for example, ecotourism, backpacking and Bed and breakfast markets.

== Promotions ==
The agency was responsible for the successful promotion campaign for Hamilton Island that was dubbed the 'Best job in the world' which received over $200M AUD in global media value, won 3 Cannes Lion advertising awards, and is cited as a viral marketing success. The 2009 Unreal Deals campaign was the agency's most successful domestic retail campaign ever. Other campaigns have targeted the Gold Coast, Sunshine Coast, tropical North Queensland and the Whitsundays.

In 2019, Queensland Premier, Annastacia Palaszczuk, declared 2019 ‘The Year of Outback Tourism’ and announced a $3 million campaign to promote holiday destinations across the Queensland Outback. Additionally, a $10 million Queensland Outback Tourism Infrastructure Fund was announced to fund a range of ‘Outback Tourism’ projects, including luxury glamping and a glass-floored bridge crossing Cobbold Gorge in Queensland’s Gulf Savannah region. In 2019, over 1 million visitors travelled to Regional Queensland.

TEQ’s next campaign, ‘The Year of Indigenous Tourism’, was announced by the Queensland Premier in November 2019. To support the 2020 campaign, the Queensland Government committed $10 million to create tourism jobs for Indigenous Queenslanders. An additional $200,000 was announced for a ‘Year of Indigenous Tourism Festivals and Events Fund’ to showcase Aboriginal and Torres Strait Islander Culture. The campaign was extended to 2021. Tourism and Events Queensland’s most recent campaign, ‘Good to Go’, was launched during the COVID-19 pandemic to encourage domestic tourism. This campaign involved transport, accommodation, experiences and activity operators completing a ‘COVID Safe program’ to provide safe experiences for visitors.

== Key Partnerships ==
Tourism and Events Queensland has engaged in several key partnerships with the Queensland Government and the state’s tourism industry, including DestinationQ. This strategic partnership promotes ongoing engagement between the tourism industry and government with the aim of identifying and agreeing on key priorities to drive future Queensland tourism industry growth and jobs. A key aspect of the partnership is the annual DestinationQ Forum and Destination Success; a long-term 20-year plan for the Queensland tourism industry.

== Strategic Focus on Asian Travellers ==
Tourism and Events Queensland developed the ‘Queensland Asia Tourism Strategy 2016-2025’ to attract more Asian travellers to Queensland, meet the needs of visitors and promote the state’s local tourism operators and regional tourism organisations. China is now the largest and most valuable international visitor market for the state’s tourism industry, with 397,000 Chinese visitors spending almost $1.3 billion in Queensland in the year ending March 2020.

== See also ==
- Economy of Queensland
